= Millicent Rogers Museum =

Museum in Taos, New Mexico, United States

Coordinates: 36.4441°N 105.5940°W

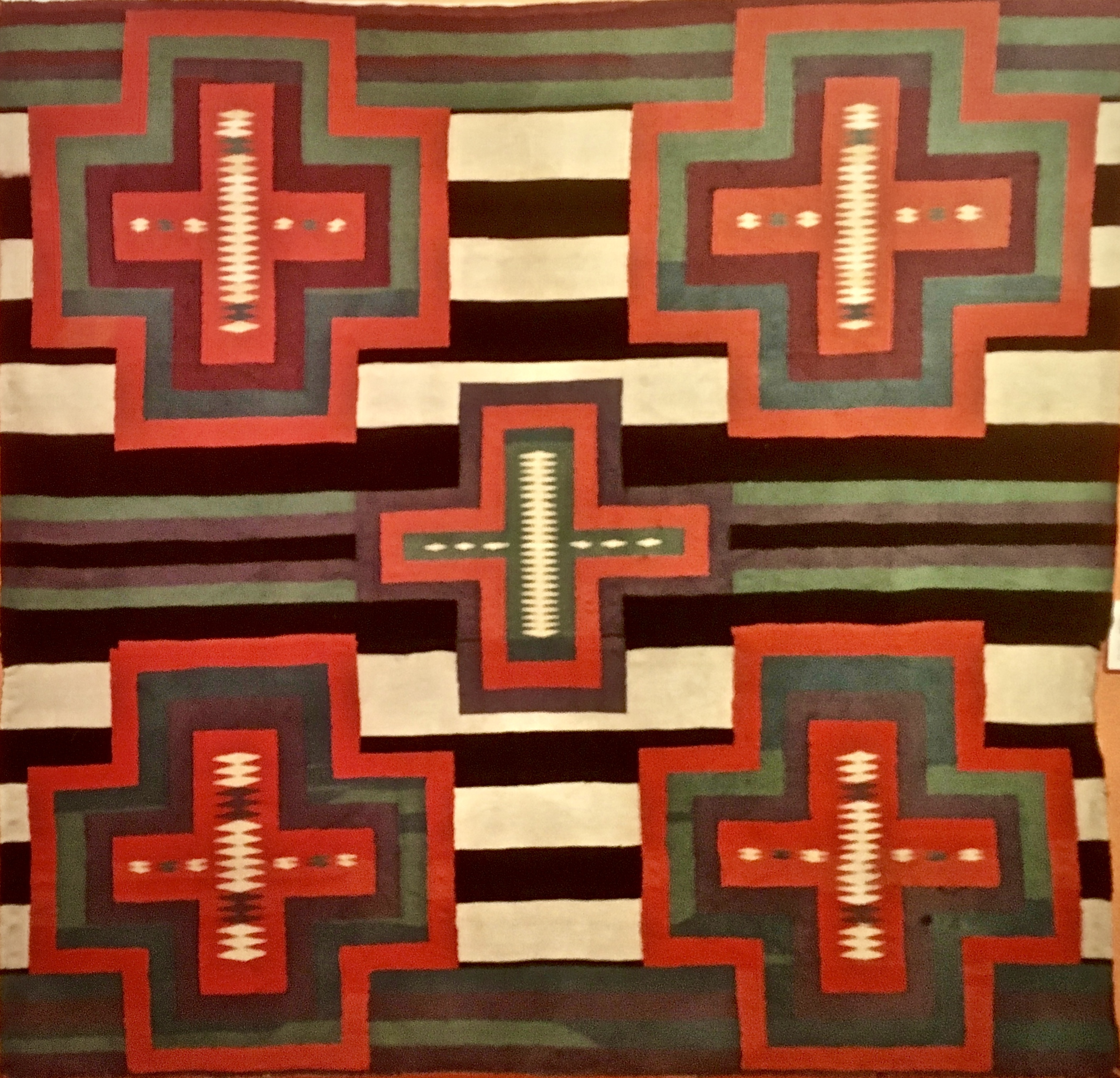
Navajo wearing blanket, Third phase, circa 1890-95

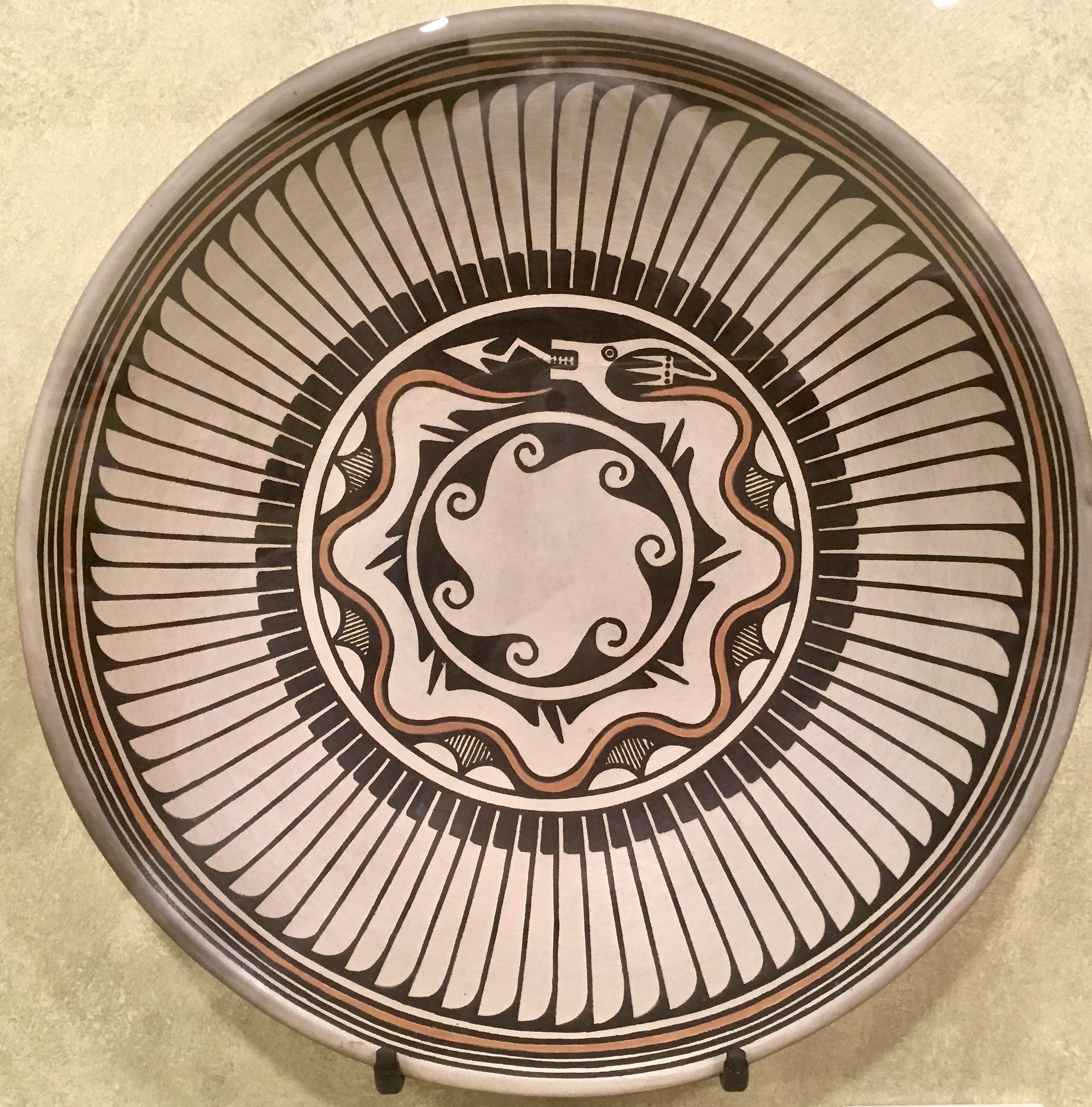
Polychrome plate with Avanyu by Maria Martinez and Popovi Da, 1969

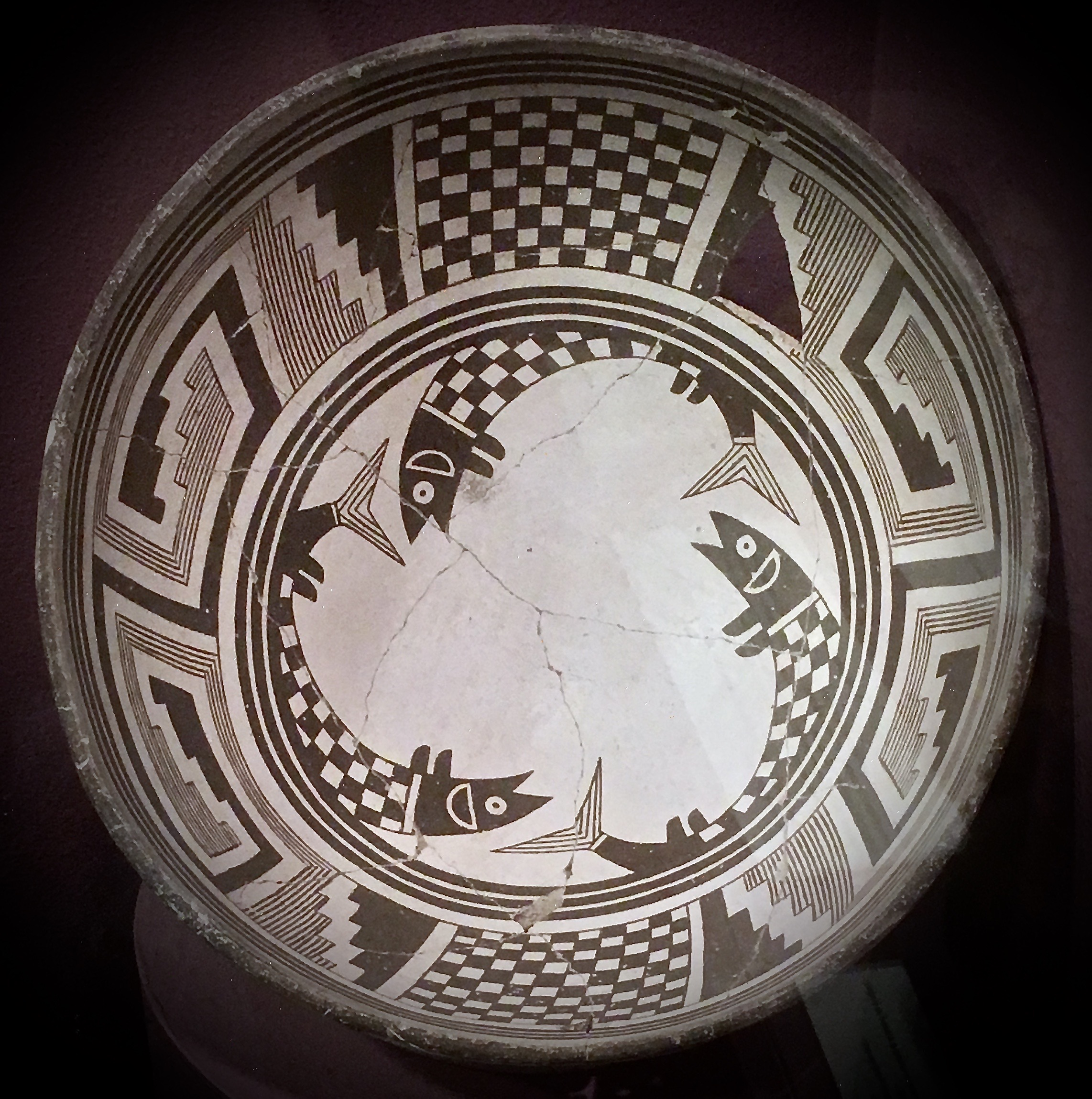
Mimbres pot depicting fish, ca. 1000–1150 AD, MRM

The Millicent Rogers Museum is an art museum in Taos, New Mexico, founded in 1956 by the family of Millicent Rogers. Initially the artworks were from the multi-cultural collections of Millicent Rogers and her mother, Mary B. Rogers, who donated many of the first pieces of Taos Pueblo art. In the 1980s, the museum was the first cultural organization in New Mexico to offer a comprehensive collection of Hispanic art.

== History ==
In 1947, Millicent Rogers, granddaughter of one of the original founders of Standard Oil , designer, collector, and patron of the arts, moved to Taos, NM. Her collection of Native American jewelry and weavings is a significant influence on Southwestern arts and design.

Rogers died of an enlarged heart when she was 50 in 1952 in Taos, New Mexico. The museum was first opened in a temporary location in the mid-1950s. In 1968 the museum moved to its permanent site, a home built by Claude J. K. and Elizabeth Anderson in Taos. In the 1980s, it was renovated and expanded by noted architect Nathaniel A. Owings.

== Collections ==
The museum houses a large collection of Native American, Hispanic and Anglo-American art, with a specific emphasis on northern New Mexico and Taos, New Mexico pieces.

The collection includes:

- pottery, including prehistoric and modern ceramics from the region and a unique collection of pottery by Maria Martinez
- paintings,
- photography and graphics
- arts and crafts
- jewelry
- traditional and contemporary Hispanic religious and domestic arts, including furniture and textiles
- Zuni and Hopi kachina figures

== Multicultural representation ==
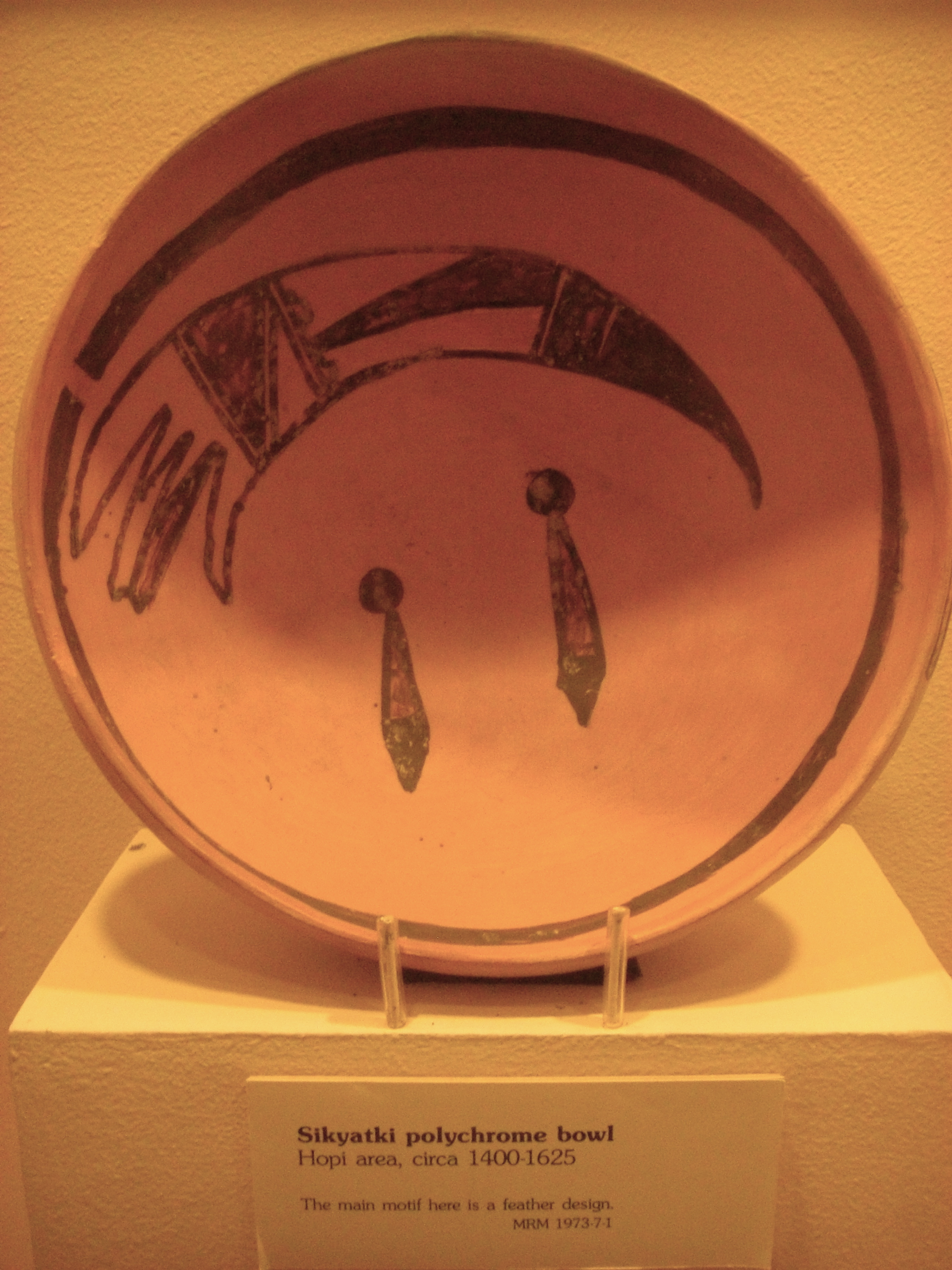
Bowl from the ruins of the former Hopi village of Sikyátki, circa 1400-1625 AD. On display at the Millicent Rogers museum.

Millicent's mother, Mary B. Rogers, was the benefactress for much of the Pueblo Indian works. In the early 1980s the museum held works of the Hispanic arts, the first major cultural organization in New Mexico to do so. Millicent collected more than 1,200 pieces of Native American and Hispanic jewelry and more than 50 Native American and Hispanic textiles, such as Navajo chief blankets and colcha embroidery.

=== Native Americans ===
In addition to the work that Rogers did for Native American rights, she also campaigned and leveraged her social connections mid-20th century to have Native American art classified as "historic", which provided both protection and status.

The museum collection includes baskets and pottery, both of which have been created and used by Native Americans for about 2,000 years.

==== Taos Pueblo ====
In an effort to increase understanding of Native American art in the 20th century, the collection includes works from Taos Pueblo painters and potterers, examples of ancient micaceous clay pottery and a large collection of works from 7th and 8th grade children, Oo-oonah, from 1968 to 1972.

Paintings by Pueblo artists Albert Looking Elk (Martinez), Albert Lujan, Juan Mirabal, Juanito Concha, and the works of other Pueblo artists are included in the museum's collection. Many of the works on paper portrayed the daily lives of Southwest Pueblo peoples.

==== Zuni and Hopi kachinas ====
Zuni and Hopi kachina figures, representations of spiritual beings, are part of the museum's collection. Zuni kachinas are believed to live in remote northeastern Arizona and bring life by giving rain and additional support, such as promote success for hunters and farmers, combat depletion of fur-bearing animals over the 19th and 20th centuries, or influence peoples' prosperity or well-being.

=== Hispanic Americans ===
The collection contains traditional and contemporary Hispanic religious and domestic arts, including furniture and textiles. Santos, developed in the late 17th century, are religious icons painted on a flat board (retablos) or carved out of wood (bultos). Tinware, likely introduced from Mexico and Spain, was used for religious adornments and household objects, such as sconces and mirrors and became increasingly popular in mid-19th century.

In 1993, the collection featured Cuban-American artist Agnez Chavez's Light Forms: Jungle Rhythms.

With a need to be self-sufficient, many Hispanic people woodworking, weaving, tinsmith, farming and leather work skills to create the furniture and furnishings for their homes. The museum's holdings include examples of such craftsmanship.

== Museum store ==
The museum store offers multicultural artwork of leading local artists, including jewelry, ceramics, textiles, woodwork, graphics and photography. It also sells a large selection of books with subjects such as the arts, architecture, literature and cultures of the Southwestern United States.

== See also ==
- Harwood Museum of Art
- Taos Art Museum
- Taos art colony
