= Taos art colony =

Art colony founded in Taos, New Mexico, United States

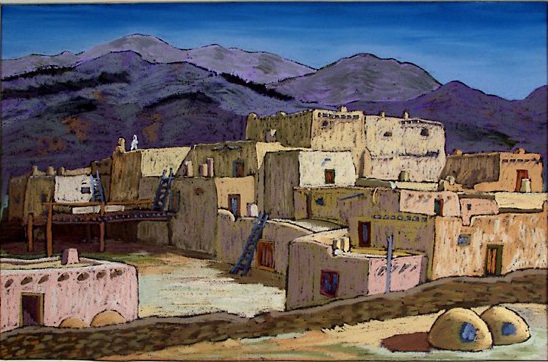
Helmut Naumer, Sr. (1935–36), Taos Pueblo

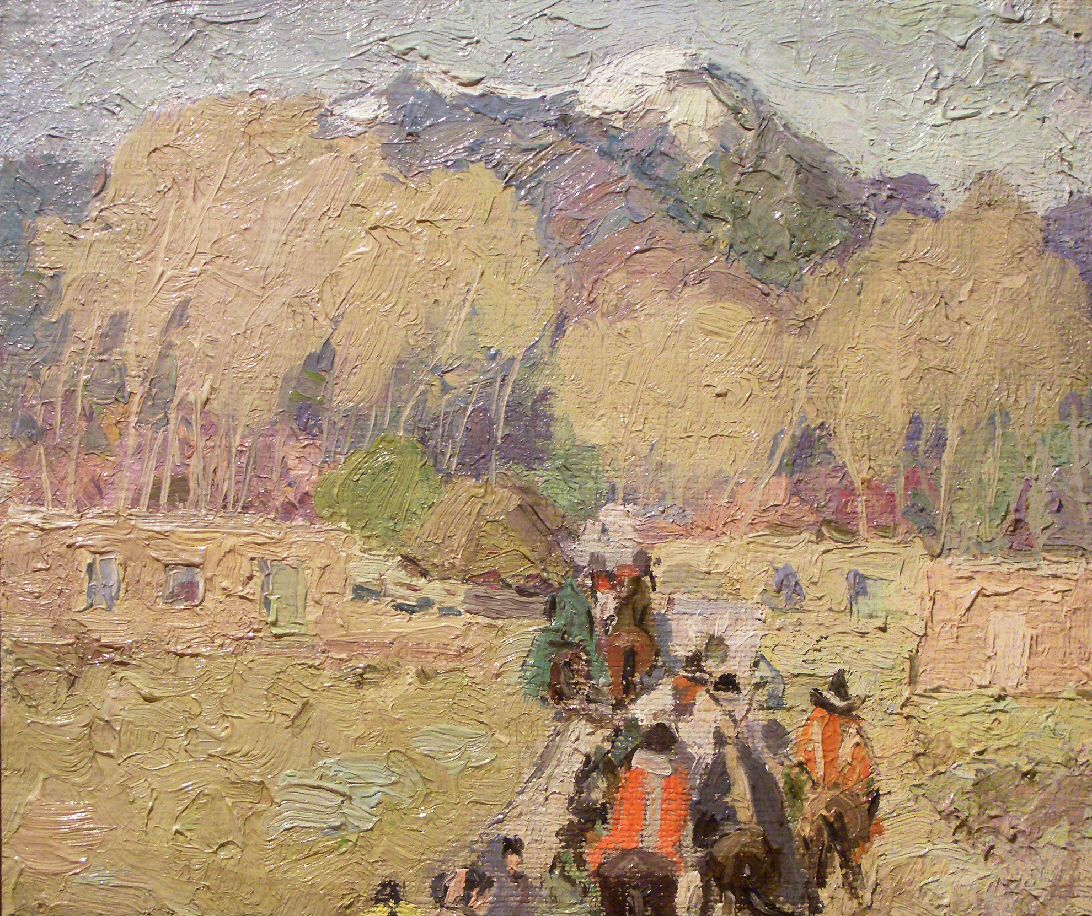
Taos Mountain, Trail Home. Cordelia Wilson, ca. 1915-1920s, Private collection

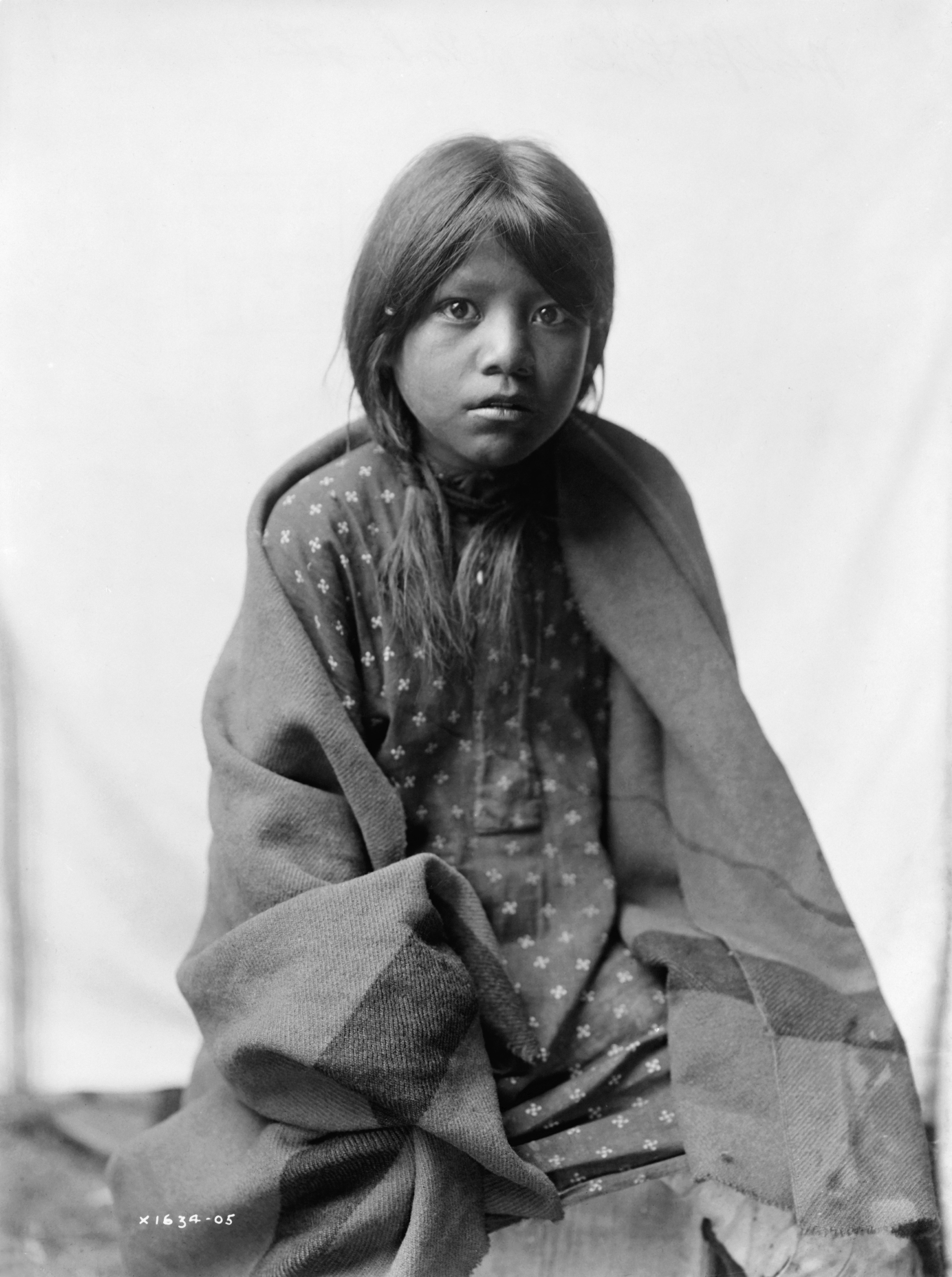
Edward S. Curtis, A Taos girl, three-quarter length portrait, seated, facing front, ca. 1905

The Taos art colony was an art colony founded in Taos, New Mexico, by artists attracted by the culture of the Taos Pueblo and northern New Mexico. The history of Hispanic craftsmanship in furniture, tin work, and other mediums also played a role in creating a multicultural tradition of art in the area.

The 1898 visit by Bert Geer Phillips and Ernest L. Blumenschein to Taos was an early step in the creation of the Taos art colony and the Taos Society of Artists. In addition to the society, Mabel Dodge Luhan was instrumental in promoting Taos to artists and writers within her circle.

In the early-20th century, modern artists infused the area with a new artistic energy, followed in the 1950s by abstract artists. Today Taos supports more than 80 galleries and three museums. There are a number of organizations that support and promote the work of artists on the Taos Pueblo and in the Taos area.

== History ==
=== Taos Pueblo ===
Located in a tributary valley off the Rio Grande, Taos Pueblo is the most northern of the New Mexico pueblos. For nearly a millennium, the Taos Indians have lived there. It is estimated that the pueblo was built between 1000 and 1450 AD, with some later expansion. The Taos Pueblo is considered to be the oldest continuously inhabited community in the United States. The pueblo, at some places five stories high, is a combination of many individual homes with common walls. There are over 1,900 people in the Taos pueblo community. Some of them have modern homes near their fields and stay at their homes on the pueblo during cooler weather. There are about 150 people who live at the pueblo year-around. The Taos Pueblo was added as an UNESCO World Heritage Site in 1992 as one of the most significant historical cultural landmarks in the world; Other sites include the Taj Mahal, Great Pyramids and the Grand Canyon in the United States.

=== Taos Pueblo artists ===
Ancient artistic traditions have been manifested in native craft for generations; an important acknowledgement for understanding the inherent aesthetic allure of this area to the Anglo-American artists. Making paintings with oil and watercolor was a new form of art to the Taos Pueblo who traditionally painted objects such as hides or inside buildings, such as on the walls of a kiva, but one embraced by artists such as Albert Looking Elk, Albert Lujan, Juan Mirabal and Juanito Concha. They provided artwork that was realistic of the Native American lifestyle in contrast to the work of Anglo-Americans romantic depictions. Traditional design elements were formalized at the Santa Fe Indian School, defining authentic Native American art.

Juanita Suazo Dubray, a lifelong resident of Taos Pueblo, is a Native American potter. In 1980, at the age of 50, Dubray began making micaceous pottery, upholding the tradition of her mother and their ancestors. Dubray added an element of sculptural relief with icons of corn, turtles, lizards, and kiva steps in relief; Her original corn design her most recognized symbol. Lori "Pop Wea" Tanner (died 1966) was also a noted potter from Taos Pueblo.

Pop Chalee, also known as Merina Lujan and "Blue Flower" (1906–1993), was the daughter of a man from the Taos Pueblo; her mother was of Swiss descent. In the 1920s she attended the Santa Fe Indian School and in the 1930s Dorothy Dunn's studio of the same school. Multi-talented, Chalee was a muralist and art instructor; she also worked in radio and the film industry.

=== Hispanic artwork ===
In the late 18th and early 19th centuries it was very expensive to ship furniture to New Mexico. Hispanic carpenters built, with great artistry, cajas (storage chests), harineros (grain chests), trasteros (kitchen cupboards) and other furniture. The work was generally carved and painted brightly.

Tinwork was also made with materials brought from Mexico and sometimes along the Santa Fe Trail. A significant growth in tin work occurred, though, once the railroad opened. At first most of the tin work was in the form of religious, devotional items. By the turn of the 20th century, tinsmiths were creating sconces, lanterns and trinket boxes.

Commissioned by churches and individuals, artists created sacred images called Santos of Roman Catholicism. Patrociño Barela (1900–1964) made secular works that greatly influenced contemporary santeros. His work, shown at the Museum of Modern Art in New York with other artists of the Federal Art Project, was the first Mexican American artist to receive national recognition.

In addition to the Taos museums, the Martinez Hacienda, a fortress occupied by Padre Martinez's family in the 19th century, provides examples of the integration of Spanish and Pueblo artistic movements in retablos (santos painted on flat pieces of wood), bultos (santos carved out of wood and sometimes painted), as well as tin work, jewelry, and basketry.

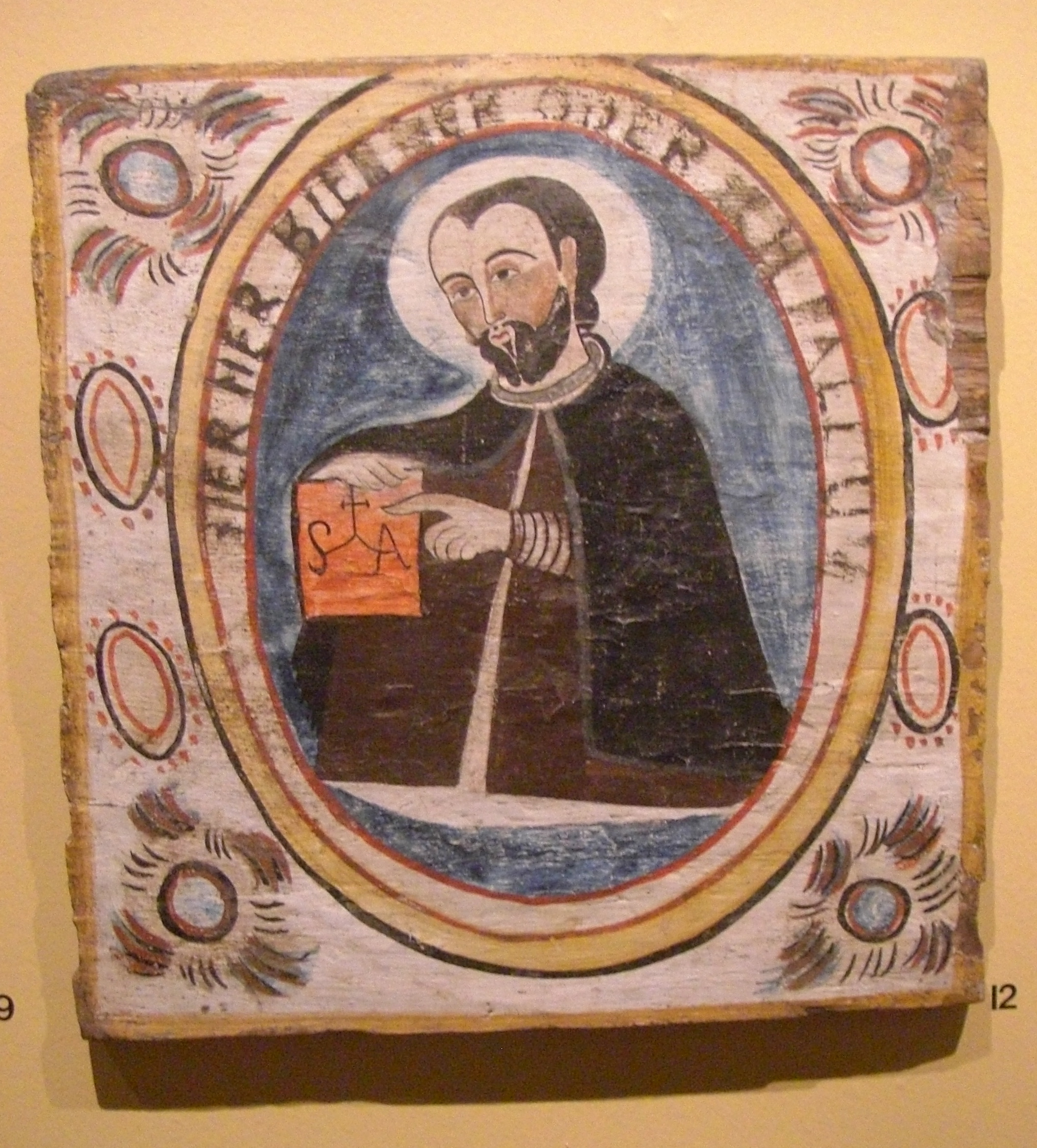
Santo, Small Spanish Colonial retablo, Harwood Museum of Art

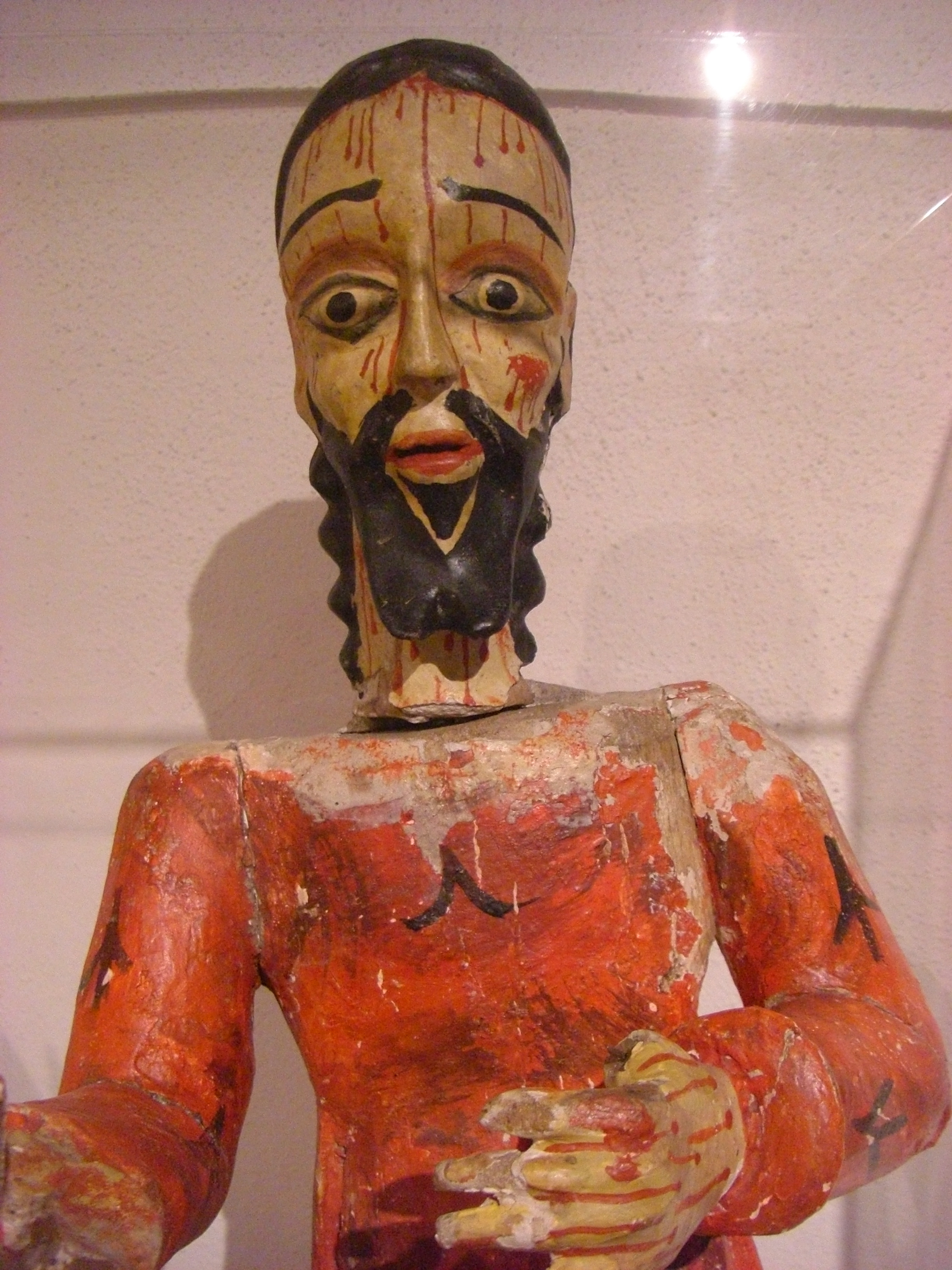
Spanish colonial bulto, Harwood Museum of Art

== Art colony ==
=== Taos Society of Artists ===
Bert Geer Phillips and Ernest L. Blumenschein came to Taos, New Mexico as part of a tour of the western United States, but upon seeing Taos, decided to stay.

An article with drawings by Blumenschein about a ceremony at Taos Pueblo appeared in the April 30, 1898, issue of Harper's Weekly.

Within a few years other American and European-born artists joined them in Taos: Joseph Henry Sharp, W. Herbert Dunton, E. Irving Couse and Oscar E. Berninghaus. These six artists were the charter members of the Taos Society of Artists.

The Taos Society of Artists works heralded the beginning of the Taos art colony, a groundbreaking association of European trained painters that collected around the visually spectacular Taos Pueblo in the Southwestern United States. The founding members fostered the emergence of a major school of American painting. Unlike other 'schools' or styles that emerged around the turn of the 19th century in the United States, the early Taos Colony artists were not united under a single manifesto or aesthetic modus, but equally lured by the stunning and, as yet, foreign environs.

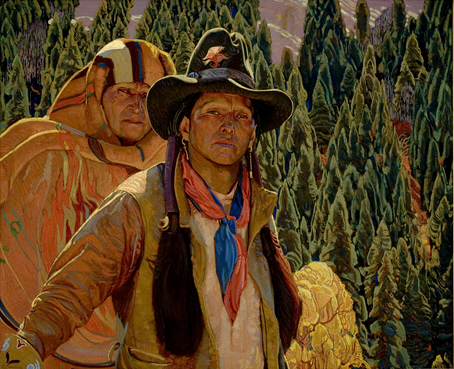
Ernest Blumenschein, Star Road and White Sun, 1920, Albuquerque Museum of Art and History

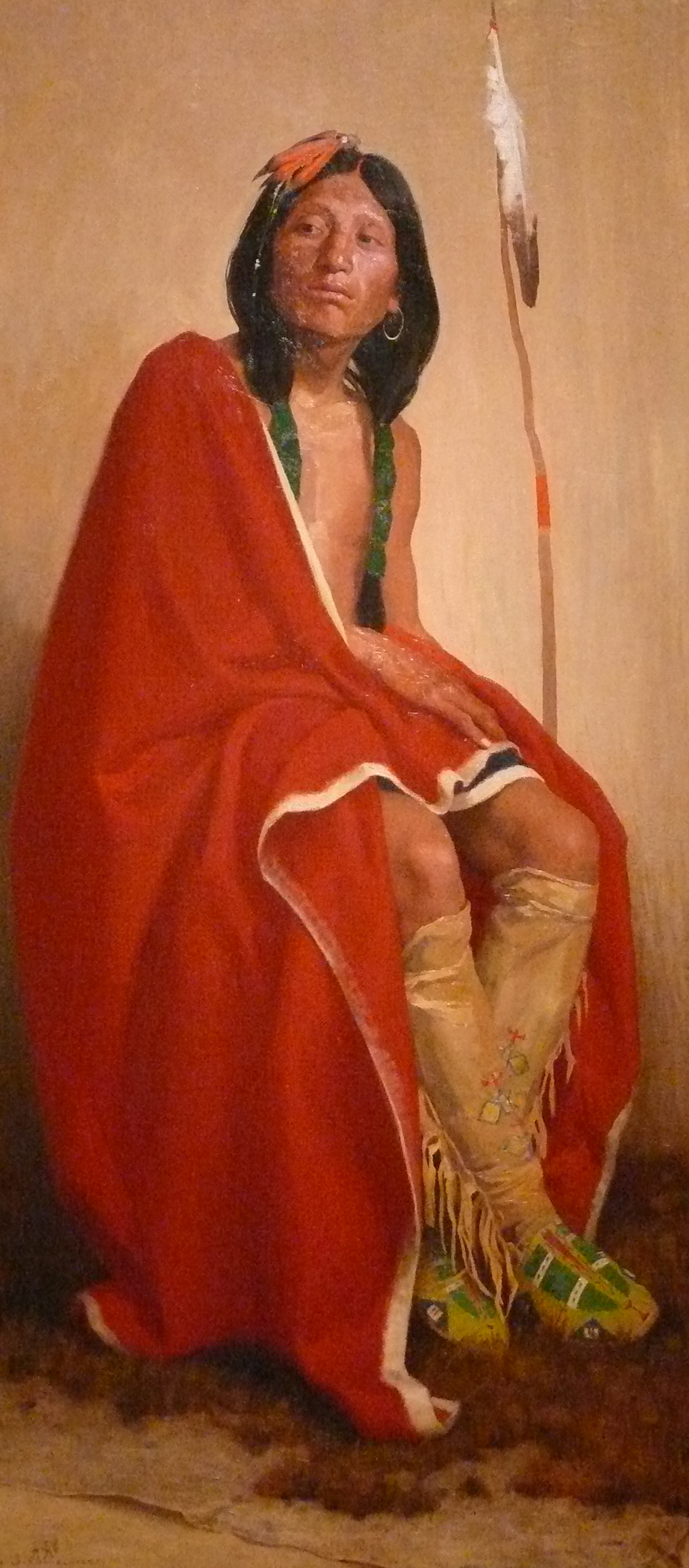
E. I. Couse, Elk Foot of the Taos Tribe, 1909, Smithsonian American Art Museum, Washington, DC

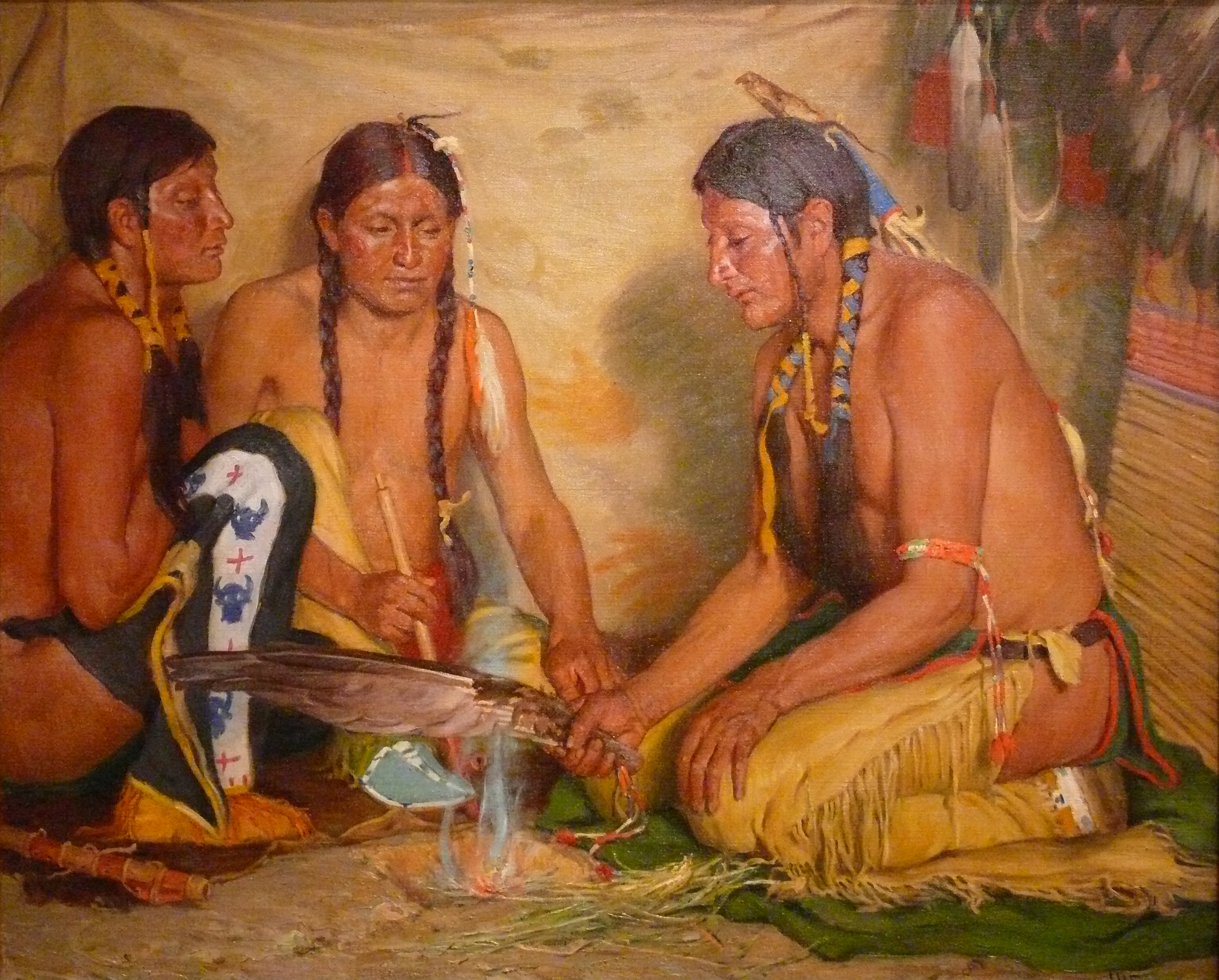
Joseph Henry Sharp, Making Sweet Grass Medicine, Blackfoot Ceremony, ca. 1920, Smithsonian American Art Museum

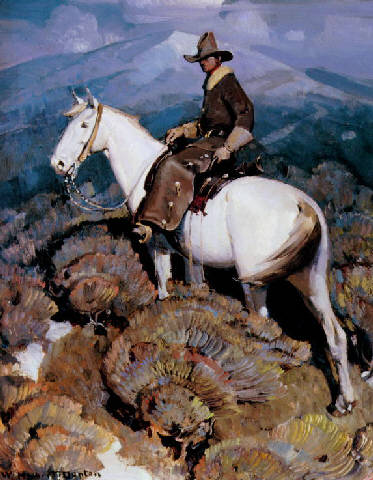
William Herbert Dunton, The Horse Rustler, ca. 1915

=== Mabel Dodge Luhan ===
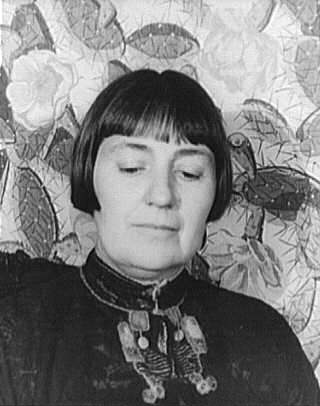
Portrait of Mabel Dodge Luhan, Carl Van Vechten, 1934

Many artists were drawn to Taos due to the presence of Mabel Dodge Luhan, a wealthy heiress from Buffalo, New York who had run a prominent art salon in Florence, Italy, and Manhattan, New York, before settling in Taos in 1917. After both divorced their spouses, Mabel Dodge married a Pueblo native, Antonio Lujan, and built a house. She spelled her married name "Luhan" as it was easier for her friends to pronounce.

While in the Southwest, Luhan carried on the tradition of the European salon in its newest of iterations. For decades, she invited artists, writers, and people from other disciplines to be inspired by Taos and each other. Among them were Ansel Adams, Georgia O'Keeffe, Alfred Stieglitz, Nicolai Fechin, author D. H. Lawrence and his wife, Frieda von Richthofen. Artist Dorothy Brett came to Taos in 1924 with her friends D. H. Lawrence and Frieda von Richthofen and later permanently settled there.

Georgia O'Keeffe settled in New Mexico in the Mabel Dodge Luhan era, but mostly kept her distance, to Mabel's annoyance.. She stayed in one of Mabel's houses in Taos in the summer of 1929 with Rebecca Strand, Paul Strand's wife, painting the country around Taos and getting to know the country. According to Calvin Tomkins, in a 1974 interview, "She rather liked Mabel Dodge Luhan—was amused by her, even when Mabel was at her bullying worst. Mabel and Dorothy Brett, the painter, and Frieda Lawrence, who had settled near Taos after D. H. Lawrence died, in 1930, carried on a running three-cornered feud. They had all idolized Lawrence, and each considered herself in some way his true muse—a situation that reached lunatic heights during their protracted squabble over Lawrence’s ashes. To prevent Mabel from stealing and scattering the ashes (as she claimed Lawrence had wished), Frieda finally had them mixed with a ton of concrete and formed into a block." The block remains on the D. H. Lawrence Ranch above Taos.

=== Andrew Dasburg ===
Parisian born Andrew Dasburg (1887–1979) was one of the earliest friends of Luhan to come and stay in Taos. He first came to Taos in 1918, and moved to Santa Fe, New Mexico in 1921, when he integrated the boxy traditional construction styles in New Mexico into his Cubist art. In Taos, Dasburg became a mentor to a group of artists known as "Taos Moderns". A leader in the Cubism movement, his works are in the collections of the Whitney Museum of American Art, the Metropolitan Museum of Art and the Denver Art Museum, among others.

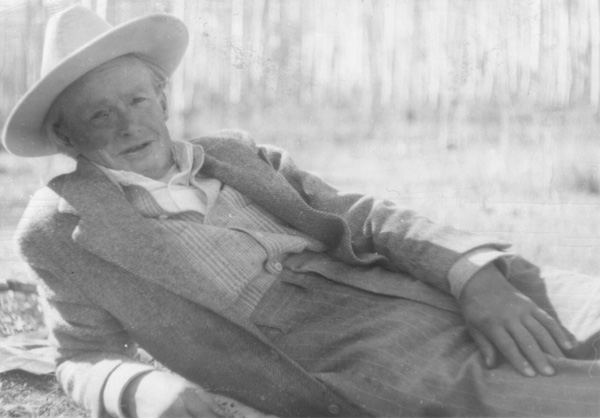
Andrew Dasburg, American Painter, 1940s

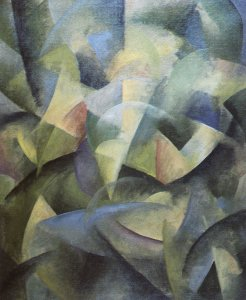
Andrew Dasburg, Improvisation, c.1915-1916

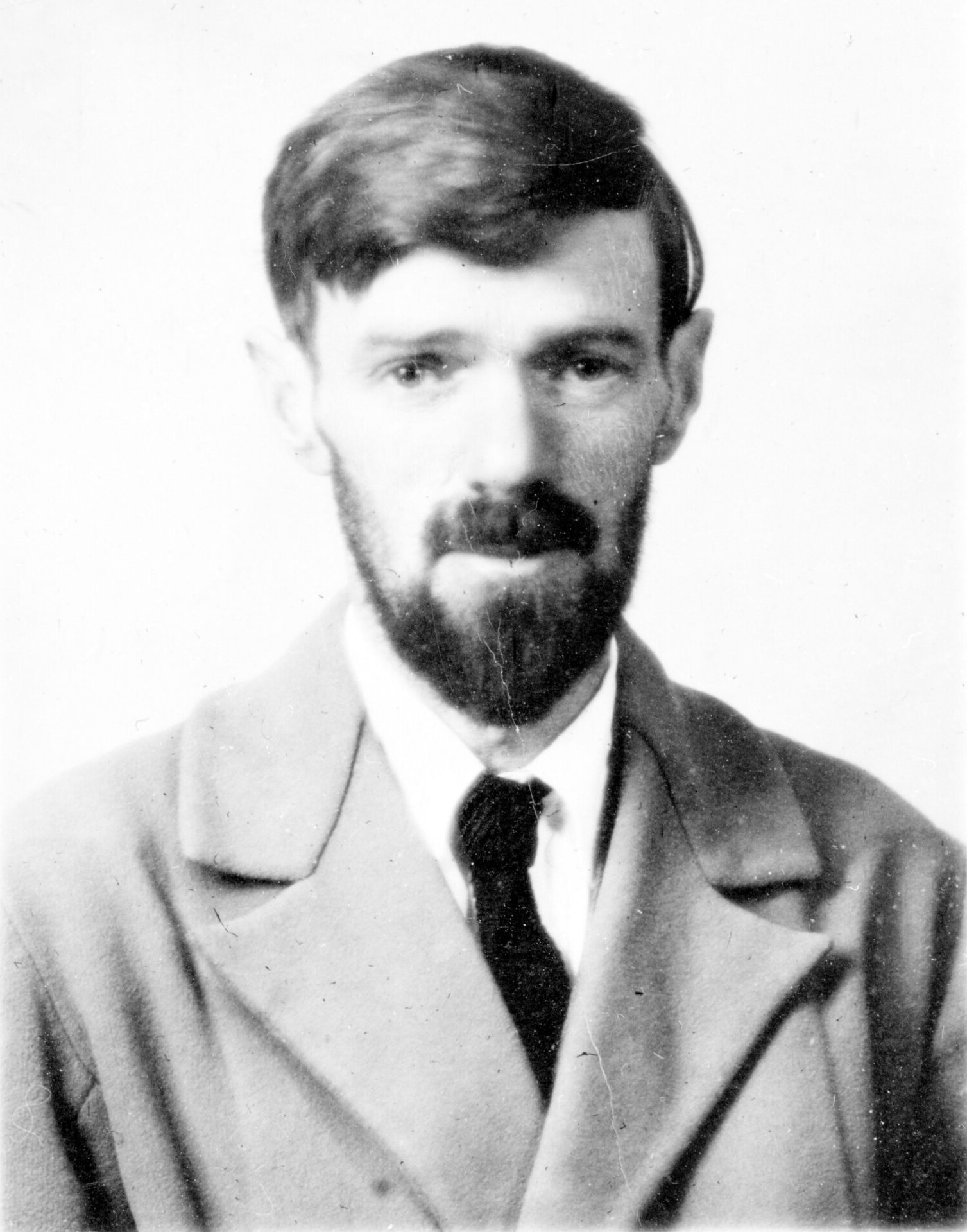
D. H. Lawrence

=== D. H. Lawrence ===
Inspired by the area and artists, D. H. Lawrence (1885–1930) painted while in Taos, signing his work "Lorenzo"; Nine of his paintings are displayed at La Fonda Hotel on the Taos Plaza.

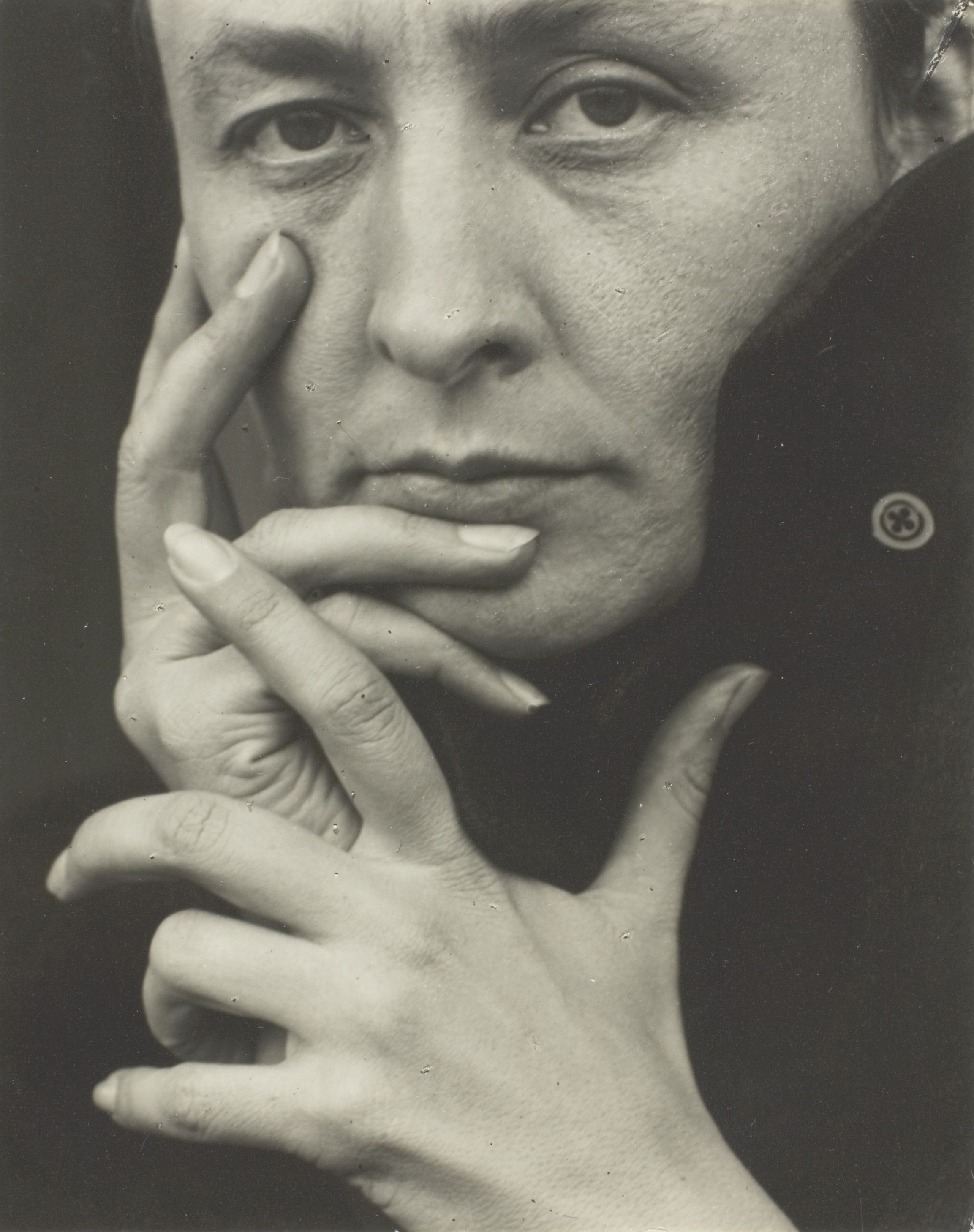
Photograph of Georgia O'Keeffe by Alfred Stieglitz in 1918.

=== Georgia O'Keeffe ===
A friend of D. H. Lawrence, Georgia O'Keeffe (1887–1986) began to spend summers with the Lawrences starting in 1930. O'Keeffe's inspiration led Lawrence to discover he had a talent for painting, too. She made iconic, colorful paintings of flowers and bones she collected during her walks through the desert. In 1940, she bought her first home in New Mexico. Her husband, Alfred Stieglitz, preferring to stay in New York, O'Keeffe spent much of the year with him. Upon his death in 1946, O'Keeffe moved permanently to her New Mexico home, in an area known as Ghost Ranch, and later built a home in Abiquiu, New Mexico.

=== Nicolai Fechin ===
Like Lawrence, Russian artist Nicolai Fechin (1881–1955) suffered from tuberculosis and found Taos helpful for managing his health. In 1927, Fechin moved to Taos with his wife and daughter. For a time they lived with Luhan, but soon purchased an adobe home that was renovated into a beautiful, unusual home with Russian wood carvings. The Taos Art Museum is located inside the Fechin House.

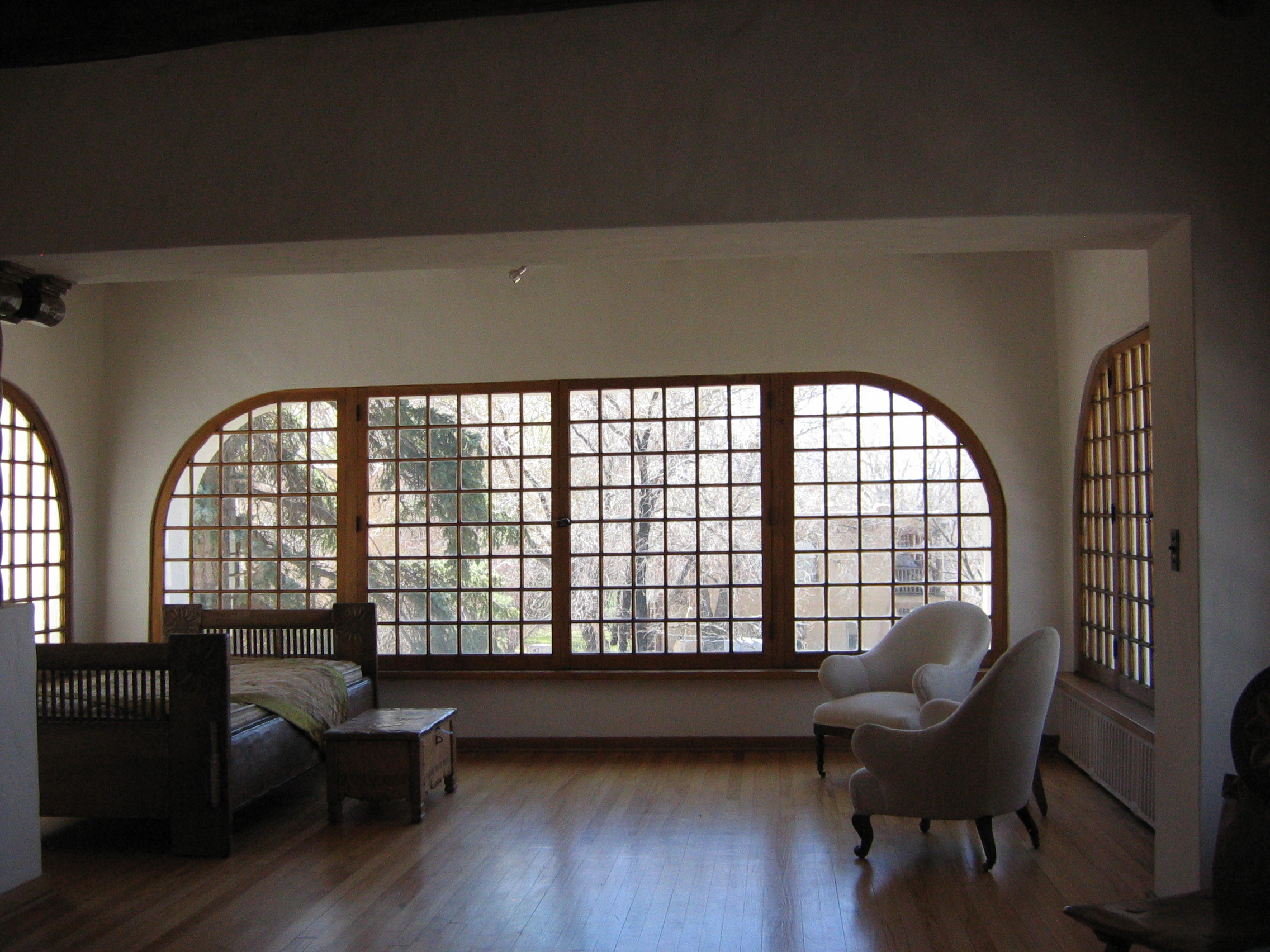
Nicolai Fechin House, Daughter's Playroom

=== Ansel Adams ===
Ansel Easton Adams (1902–1984) was a photographer, best known for his black-and-white photographs of the American West. In 1930, Taos Pueblo, Adams's second portfolio, was published. In New Mexico, he was introduced to notables from Alfred Stieglitz's circle, including painter Georgia O'Keeffe, artist John Marin, and photographer Paul Strand, all of whom created famous works during their stays in the Southwest.

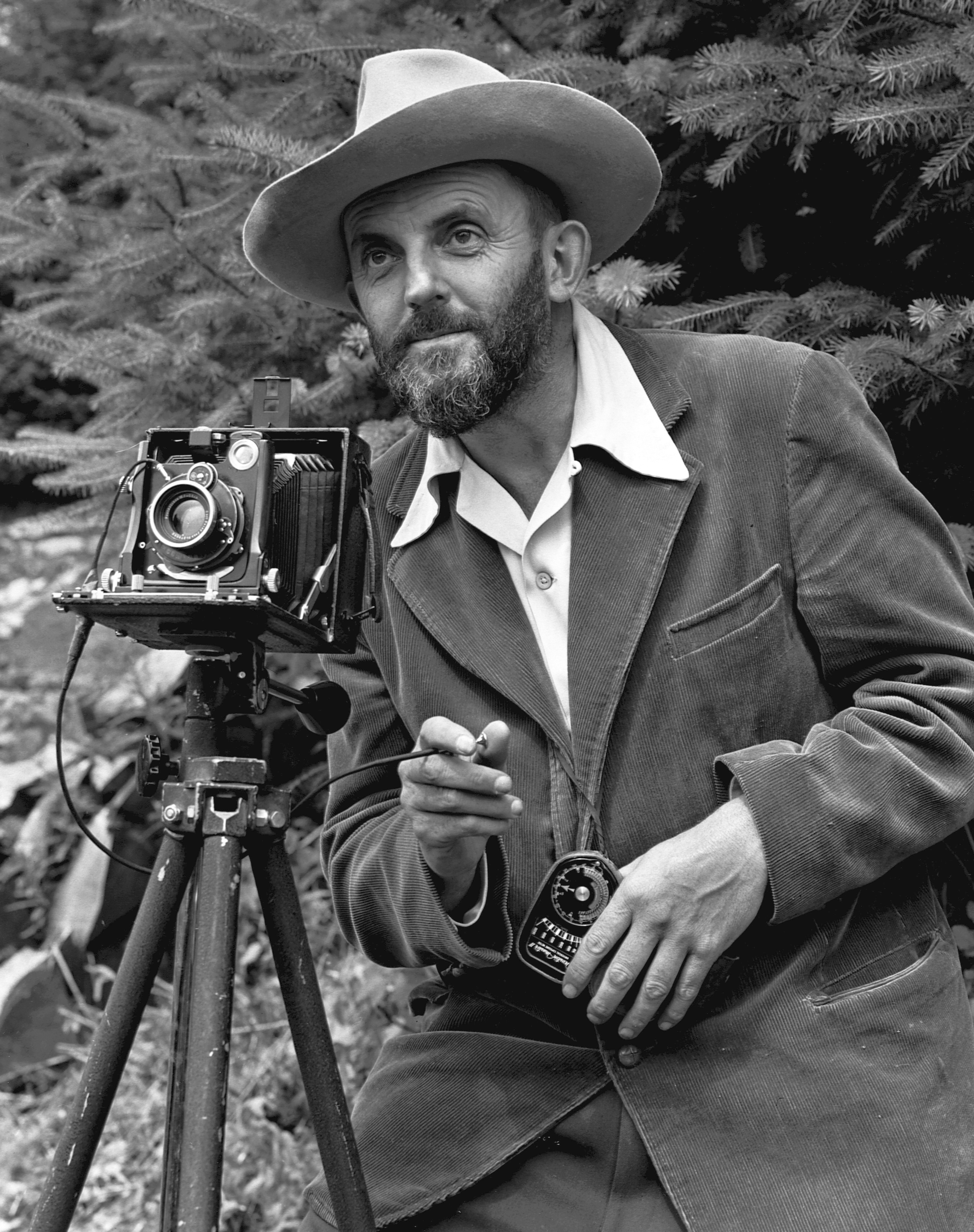
Ansel Adams and camera, photograph by J. Malcolm Greany

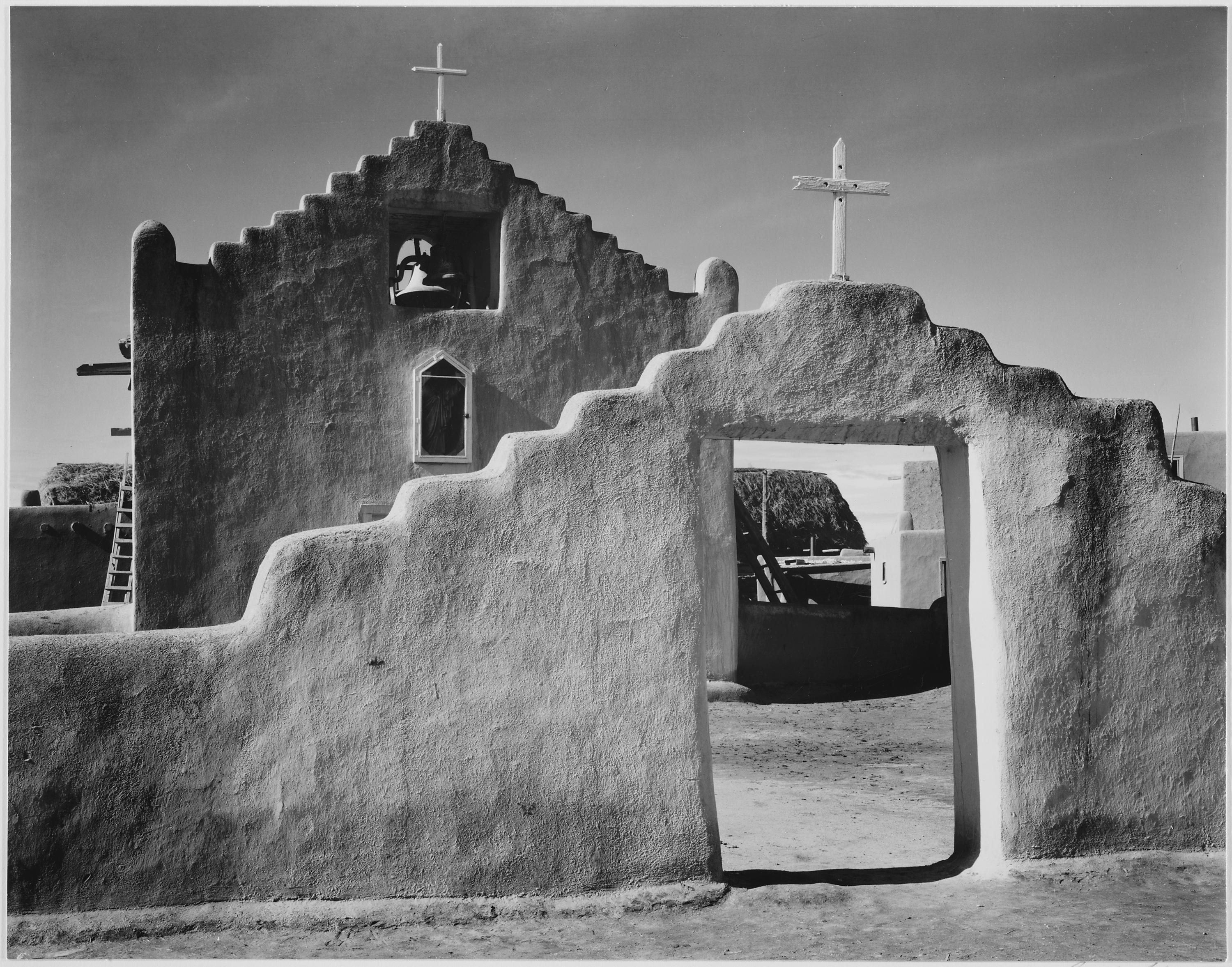
Church, Taos Pueblo, National Historic Landmark, New Mexico, photograph by Ansel Adams, 1941.

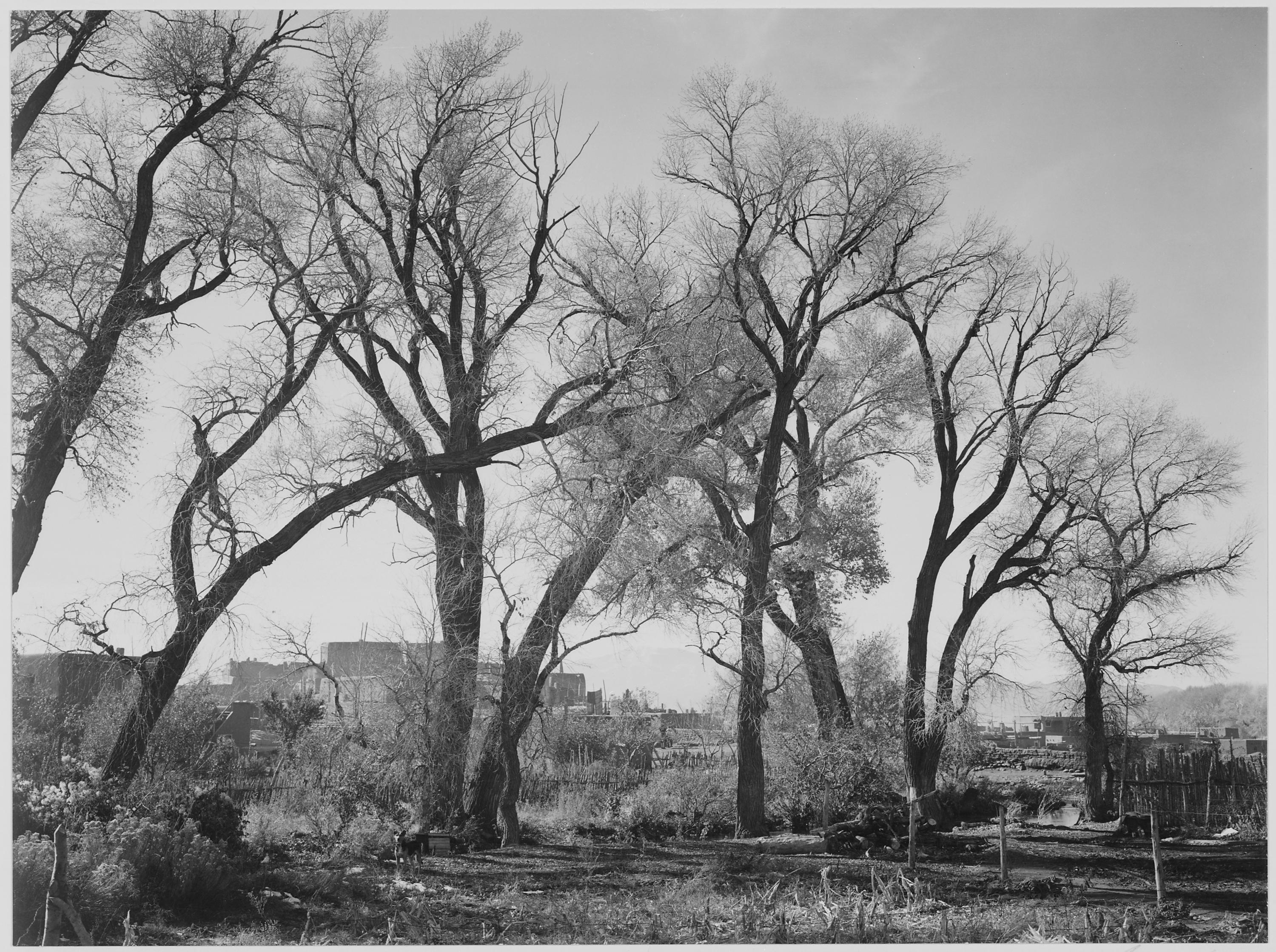
At Taos Pueblo, National Historic Landmark, New Mexico, photograph by Ansel Adams, 1941.

=== Other early 20th-century artists ===
Cordelia Wilson, an artist from Georgetown, Colorado developed her skills as an artist motivated by latest trends in American realism led by Robert Henri. Her academic training emphasized development of an alla prima technique and painting out of doors, which inspired her to produce bold impasto works quickly. She started making road trips to New Mexico and became friends with painters in the Taos Society of Artists and the Santa Fe art colony. Her numerous expressive oil sketches and en plein air canvases of adobe dwellings and rugged landscapes caught the attention of art dealers.

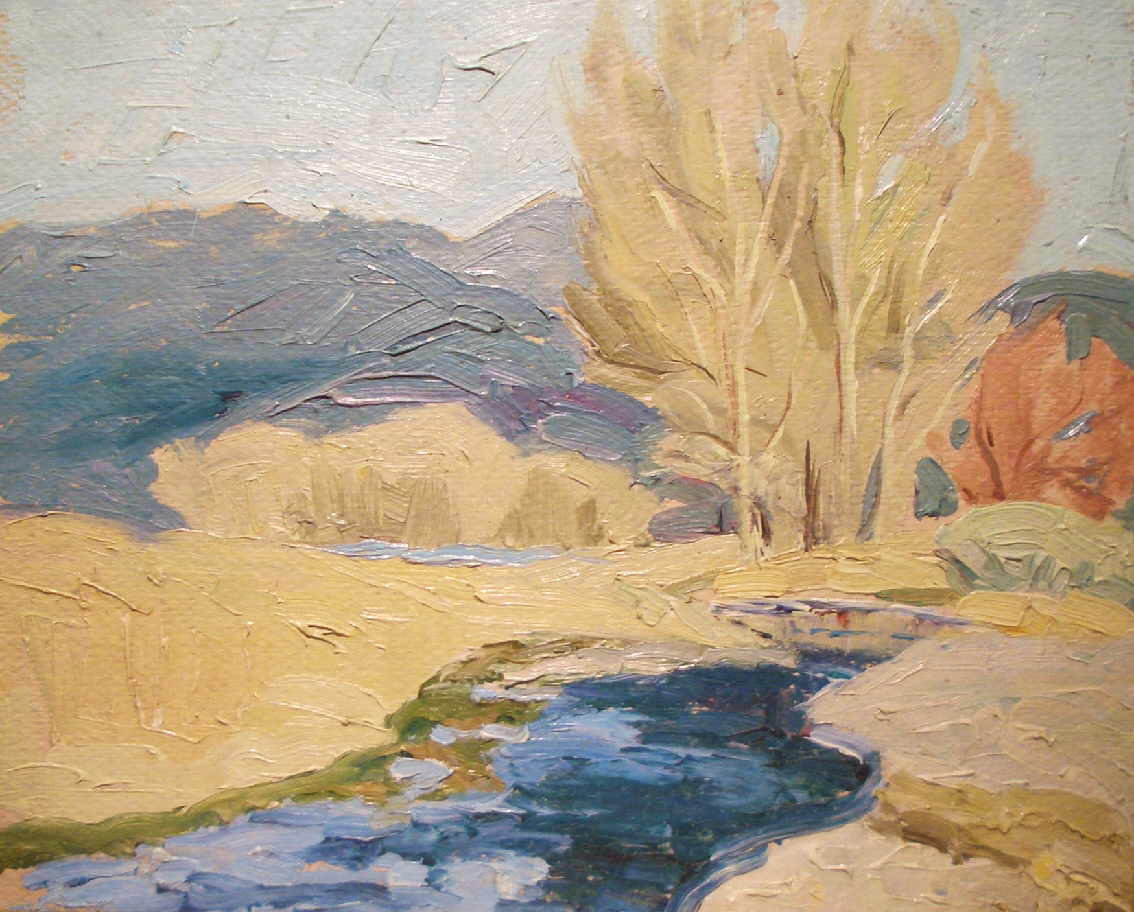
Autumn in the Sangre de Cristos, ca. 1915–1920, Cordelia Wilson, Private collection

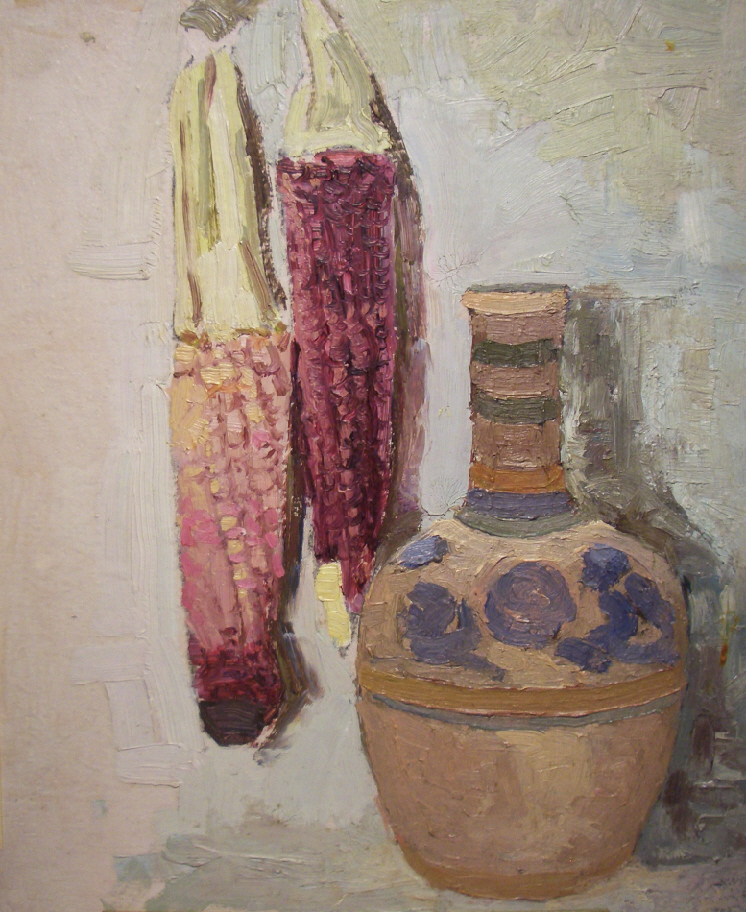
Indian Corn and Mexican Vase, Cordelia Wilson, ca. 1915-1920s, Private collection

Maynard Dixon (1875-1946), a California born artist who specialized in painting South Western landscapes, people and architecture, visited and resided several times in New Mexico and Taos, coming first in 1900 with the writer Charles Lummis and later in 1931 in Taos with his wife the photographer Dorothea Lange. He produced dozens of drawings and painting during these visits and stays, while declining to join the Taos Society of Artists to which he had been invited by Ernest Blumenschein.

Rebecca Salsbury James (1891–1968) was largely a self-taught artist, although, after coming to Taos she was influenced by friend, Georgia O'Keeffe. She is most known for her work with reverse oils on glass and also worked in oils, pastels and a Spanish folk art form, colcha embroidery.

Ouray Meyers, a Taos artist, is the son of Ralph Meyers who was an artist, writer, and trader who was good friends with members of the Taos Society of Artists, such as Joseph Henry Sharp and W. Herbert Dunton; He was also a friend of Leon Gaspard, Nicolai Fechin, Dorothy Brett, and Georgia O'Keeffe. As a boy, Ralph Meyers met the artists who often visited his parents’ home. Meyers developed his own unique style, influenced by the early Taos painters.

In 1923, Akseli Gallen-Kallela departed for the US to organize an exhibition at the Chicago Art Institute and retrieve his works, which had been lost there since the Panama-Pacific International Exposition in 1915. He successfully located most of them and showcased them in the exhibition. During his time in the country, he painted landscapes and portraits, and he also traveled around extensively. Homesick, he was joined by his wife and daughter in 1924. They spent some time in the artist colony in Taos, New Mexico, before continuing their travels and ultimately returning to Finland in the spring of 1926.

== Postwar modernism ==
=== Taos Moderns ===
In the 1940s a group of artists, some of whom had studied contemporary European and American modernist art under the G.I. bill, came to Taos. Arriving from cities like New York and San Francisco that were centers for the forms of abstract painting that emerged after World War II, they transformed Taos into a hotbed of contemporary art. These artists became known as the "Taos Moderns" and included Thomas Benrimo, Emil Bisttram, Edward Corbett, Joseph Glasco, R.C. Ellis, Cliff Harmon, Janet Lippincott, Ward Lockwood, Louis Leon Ribak, Beatrice Mandelman, Agnes Martin, Robert Ray, Earl Stroh, and Clay Spohn. Other visiting artists include Richard Diebenkorn, Mark Rothko, Ad Reinhardt, Clyfford Still, and Morris Graves. Andrew Dasburg already came to Taos and was a mentor to many of the new artists, and his own works also evolved towards a more abstract expressionist style.

Like earlier artists, they portrayed the colorful New Mexican landscape and cultural influences, such as the "timelessness they perceived in Puebloan culture and the deep connection to the land they noted in the everyday life of both Native Americans and Hispanics influence experimentation and innovation in their own art." Rather than capturing realist images of people and the landscape, they sought to capture the true meaning of their subjects.

=== Other postwar artists ===
Bill Rane, "Woman Entangled" c. 1990. Oil on canvas, 60" x 48". This is one of Rane's best-known paintings.

Other postwar artists such as R. C. Gorman and Bill Rane also made Taos their home.

R. C. Gorman (1931–2005) was an internationally renowned artist of the Navajo Nation, sometimes called the "Picasso" of the American Indian Arts. Even so, he was not accepted by the entire Taos art colony. Gorman opened "The Navajo Gallery" in 1968 on historic Ledoux Street, the first art gallery owned by a Native American in the United States. It contained a large body of his work and those of some local Taos artists. Gorman was a collector of art, such as works by European masters Picasso and Chagall, and local artists, such as Bill Rane, whose work Gorman identified as his favorite of the artist colony.

Bill Rane (1927 - 2005) was an artist and Taos gallery owner. His historic Taos gallery is maintained by his widow, Judith Rane. Bill Rane was born in Oregon, grew up in Idaho, and studied art and literature at San Francisco State University and the University of California, Berkeley. Rane lived and worked in the Bay Area of California until he moved to Taos, where he lived until his death in 2005.

== Organizations ==
=== Taos Art Association ===
In the 1950s a group of Taos artists decided to form the Taos Art Association (TAA). They purchased the Manby estate and turned the mansion into art galleries and in the gardens an outdoor community theater. In 2000, the Taos Art Association (TAA) became the Taos Center for the Arts (TCA). It is the oldest non-profit arts organization in the state of New Mexico.

=== Taos Artist Organization ===
Taos Artist Organization is a group of 140+ artists living in Taos and working in a variety of creative media.

=== Taos Gallery Association ===
Taos has over 80 privately owned art galleries.

=== Taos Pueblo artists ===
Contemporary native artists of Taos Pueblo create handcrafted goods using methods passed down through generations of family artisans. Modern interpretation of traditional art is reflected in their sculpture, painting and jewelry. For centuries the Taos pueblo potters have been creating micaceous pottery; now, the pottery is made with a high polish. Also produced on the pueblo are tanned buckskin moccasins and drums.

== Museums ==
=== Harwood Museum of Art ===
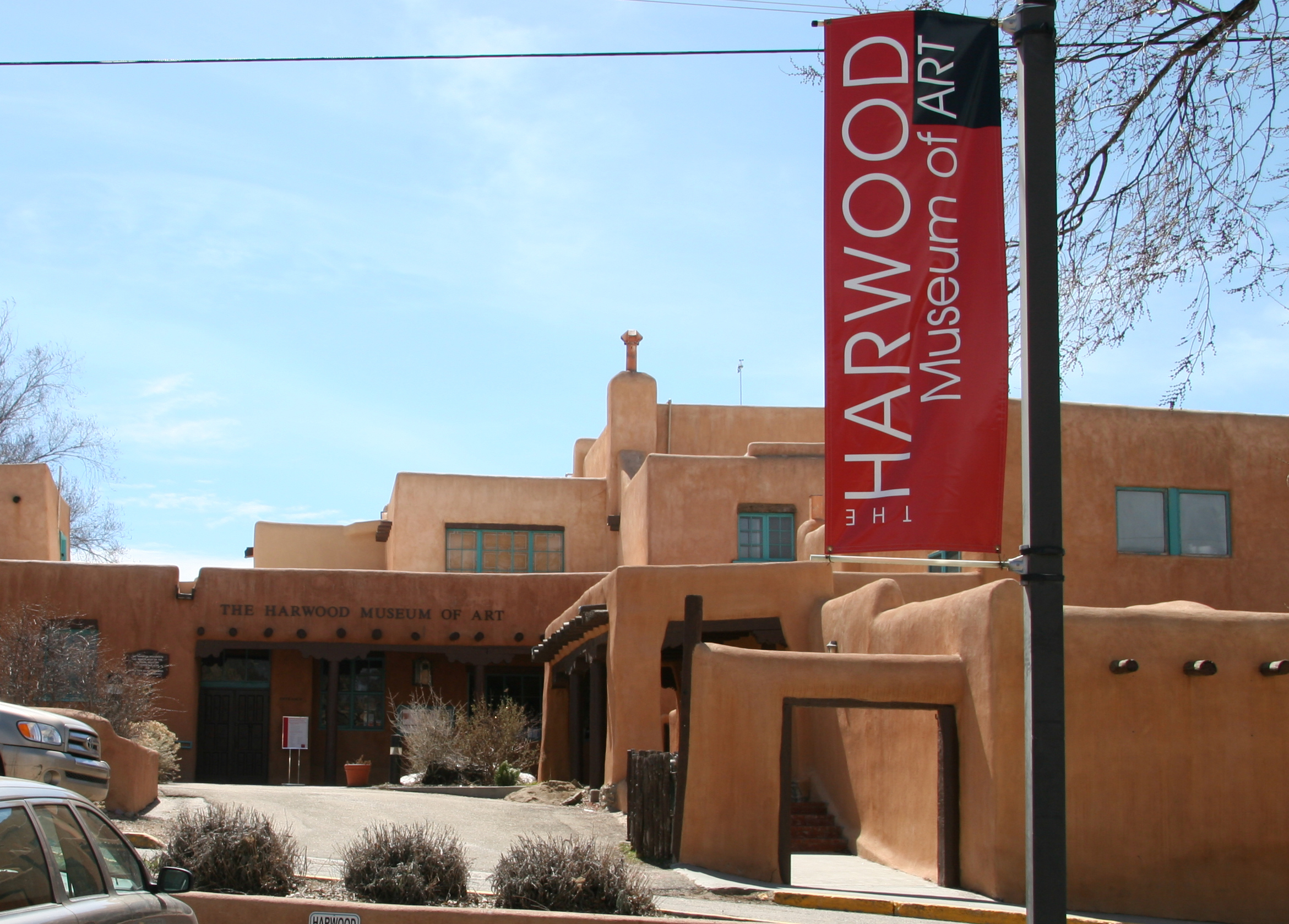
Harwood Museum, Taos

The Harwood Museum of Art in Taos has a permanent collection of over 1,700 works of art and 17,000 photographic images. The collection of works from the 19th century to the present reflect the multicultural heritages and influences of the Taos artistic community. The categories of works include: Hispanic, Taos Society of Artists, Taos Moderns, Contemporary, and Prints, Drawings and Photographs.

=== Millicent Rogers Museum ===
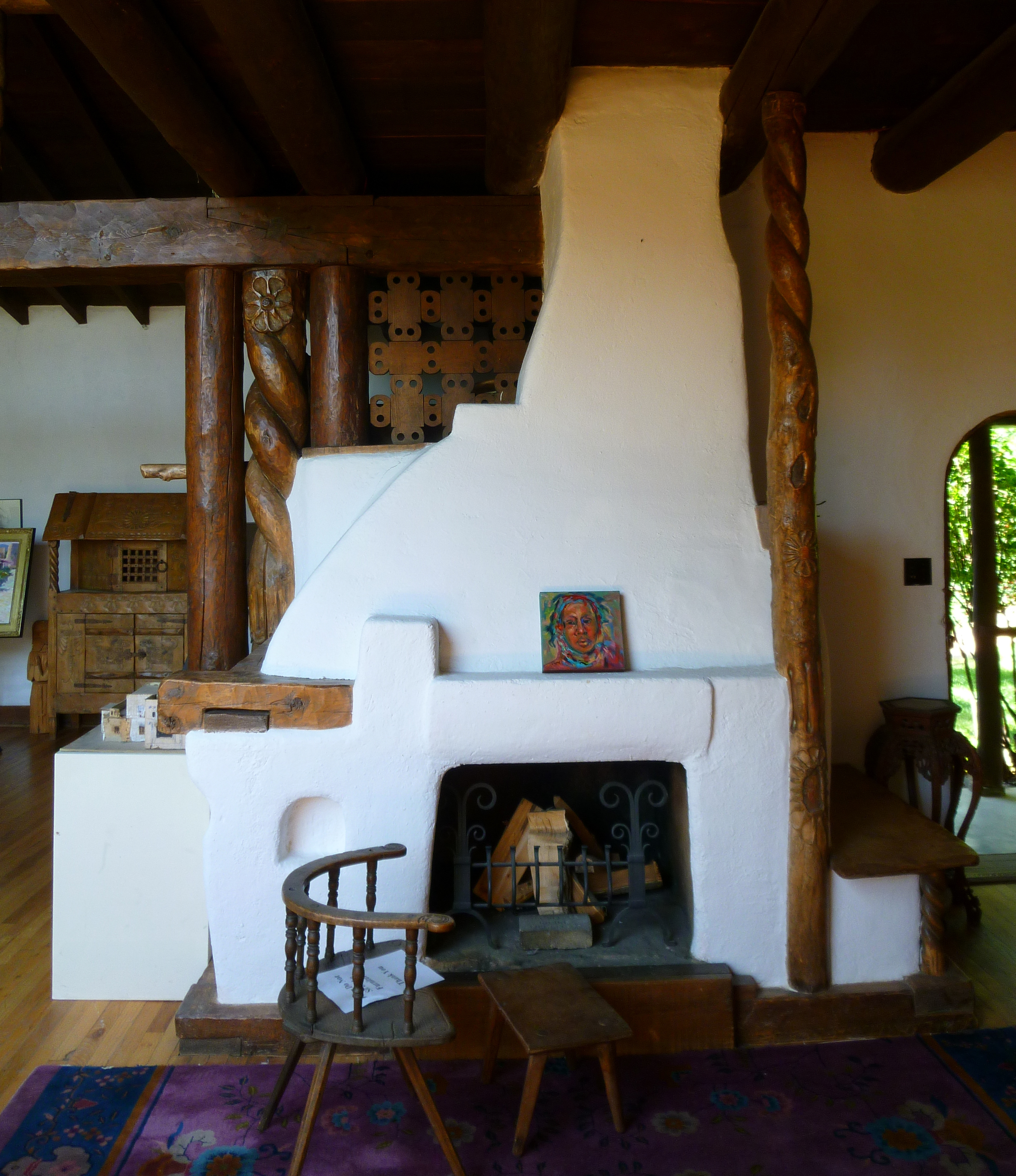
Fechin Studio Interior Fireplace Detail at Taos Art Museum

The Millicent Rogers Museum is a collection of items of southwestern Indian culture. Millicent Rogers was instrumental in the promotion of the Native American culture. The collections include weavings, kachinas, pottery, baskets, tin work, and contemporary art. In the early 1980s the museum held works of the Hispanic art movement, the first major cultural organization in New Mexico to do so. Millicent's mother, Mary B. Rogers, was the benefactoress for much of the Pueblo Indian works.

Paintings by Pueblo artists Albert Looking Elk (Martinez), Albert Lujan, Juan Mirabal, Juanito Concha, and the works of other Pueblo artists are included in the Museum's collection.

=== Taos Art Museum ===
The Taos Art Museum at Fechin House presides over a collection including paintings by full and associate members of the Taos Society of Artists, various Taos Moderns, Nicolai Fechin and assorted other Taos artists. It is housed in Fechin's former home and studio. Exhibitions in Fechin's studio feature contemporary artists working in Taos, while temporary exhibits in the historic home highlight artists from the region's rich creative past.

== See also ==
- Santa Fe art colony
