= Newcomb-Macklin Company =

The Newcomb-Macklin Company of Chicago, Illinois was a nationally prominent manufacturer of hand-carved and gilded picture frames. The company was in operation from 1883 until 1979. Many of Newcomb-Macklin's frames designed in the early 20th century reflected the esthetics of the Arts and Crafts movement that flourished in the United States between 1900 and 1925. Newcomb-Macklin frames in the arts and crafts style are today regarded as antiques and are often utilized by collectors and dealers to lend an air of authenticity to the framing of period American paintings.

== Company history ==
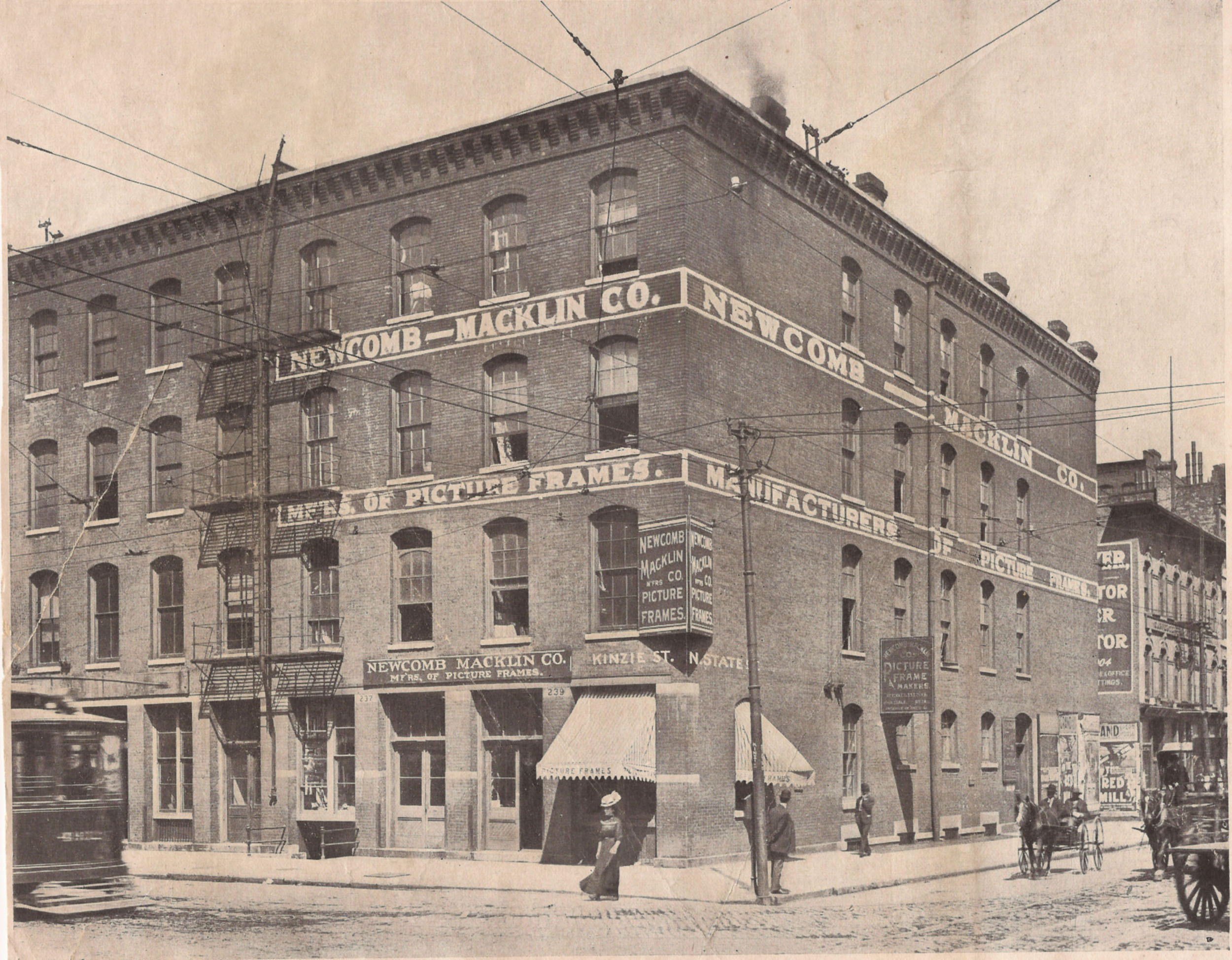
Newcomb-Macklin Company's Chicago factory on State Street, circa 1900

The Newcomb-Macklin Company traced its roots to a regional frame manufacturer founded in 1871 in Evanston, Illinois by S. H. McElswain. After twelve years in business, in 1883, McElswain sold his company to a partnership formed by the firm's bookkeeper, Charles Macklin, and John C. Newcomb. The partners relocated their business to Chicago, Illinois, where the company's production plant occupied a full city block at 400-408 N. State Street in the city's near north side. Sales were generated by a product showroom adjacent to the Chicago factory and by a traveling sales force. Within a few years, the company also opened product showrooms in New York City and Glendale, California, though the Glendale location closed about 1940.

Newcomb-Macklin Company ceased operation in 1979 when the assets of the company were acquired by Thanhardt-Burger Corporation of LaPorte, Indiana. Thanhardt-Burger sold frames based on Newcomb-Macklin's designs until 2013, when the company's frame-making facility in LaPorte was destroyed by fire.

== Newcomb-Macklin product line ==
Newcomb-Macklin picture frames were distinguished by their unique, perpendicular corner splines, a construction feature that prevented the corners of a frame from separating over time. Basswood was the company's preferred wood for hand-carving. Newcomb-Macklin frames were gilded with a wide variety of gold leaf, silver leaf and metal leaf finishes.

=== Arts and Crafts style frames ===
Patterns for Newcomb-Macklin's arts and crafts style frames were conceived by an in-house stable of designers. These designs were then hand-carved into frame molding on the company's production floor and the frames assembled. This creative capability also enabled company craftsmen to produce frames that were designed according to a customer's specifications. Maxfield Parrish, Childe Hassam, George Bellows and John Singer Sargent were among the company's most famous custom-order clients. Newcomb-Macklin designers incorporated motifs from as far away as New Mexico into their arts and crafts compositions, creating demand for these frames within the Taos art colony.

=== Classic frames ===
Much of Newcomb-Macklin's product line derived from the manufacture of exact copies of classic frames from a variety of periods and countries. Company sales literature promoted designs that were copied from colonial-period American frames, early American frames, Civil War-period American frames, French frames produced during the reigns of Louis XIII, Louis XIV, Louis XV, and Louis XVI, Dutch frames, Barbizon frames, 16th century Italian frames, and 17th century English frames. Newcomb-Macklin owned the rights to frames conceived by Stanford White, a nationally known American architect who was sensationally murdered in 1906, in New York, by Harry Kendall Thaw, and the company's sales literature promoted White's Renaissance-inspired designs.

=== Additional products ===
In addition to picture frames, the company manufactured a line of ornately framed mirrors, picture frame moldings for use in commercial frame shops, accent tables, and decorative specialties such as cornices and fan display boxes.
