= Juanita Suazo Dubray =

- Born: 1930 (age 95–96)
- Known for: Ceramics

Juanita Suazo Dubray (born 1930) also known as Juanita DuBray, is a Native American potter from Taos Pueblo, New Mexico. She is a lifelong resident of Taos Pueblo and descends from an unbroken line of Taos Pueblo natives. Her mother Tonita made traditional micaceous pottery for utilitarian use. She became interested in the micaceous pottery tradition in 1980 after a career of working as a pharmaceutical technician.

She started making micaceous pottery at the age of 50 with the encouragement of a neighbor who gave her some clay. When she first started making pottery she made one-of-a-kind micaceous pots using different ancient designs and symbols. Eventually she began using more contemporary designs and symbols on her pots, making them out of both micaceous and white clay. She added an element of sculpture, producing many pieces with icons of corn, turtles, lizards, and kiva steps in relief. Her original corn design has become her most recognized symbol. She also often includes traditional ornamentation of rope fillets, tool-impressed rims and loop handles on her pots. Juanita has also produced sculptured objects including nativity scenes and storyteller dolls.

As a self-taught potter, Juanita has come a long way in mastering the skills of making traditional micaceous pottery. She has attended numerous shows and exhibitions including the Santa Fe Indian Market, Denver Indian Market, the San Ildefonso, and San Juan Pueblo Eight Northern Indian Markets among others. In 1988, she received first place in the San Ildefonso Eight Northern Indian Market. In 1994, she was designated a Master Potter by the School of American Research and was invited to attend the school's Micaceous Pottery Artists Convocation. She was one of ten master micaceous potters to attend. In June 2004, she also taught a workshop at the Taos Art School on making traditional Taos Pueblo micaceous pottery.

== Collections ==
Dubray's work is in the collections of the Millicent Rogers Museum, the Samuel Poliakoff Collection of Western Art at the Abbeville County Library System, Abbeville, SC, the Holmes Museum of Anthropology at the University of Wichita, and the University of Dayton Marian Library Crèche Collection.
