= Juan Mirabal =

American artist (1903–1981)

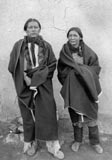
- Juan Mirabal wears moccasins, leggings, shirt, scarf tied around neck, and is wrapped in a blanket. G. Mirabal wears moccasins, leggings, a dress, and is wrapped in a blanket.
- Born: Juan Mirabal, Tapaiu or Red Dancer; 1903
- Died: 1981 (aged 77–78)
- Education: Marjorie Eaton, American modernist artist and Louis Leon Ribak, a Taos modernist painter
- Known for: Realistic depiction of pueblo life: oil paintings and murals
- Movement: Modern art and Cubism

Juan Mirabal (1903 – 1981), also known as "Tapaiu" or Red Dancer, was an artist from Taos Pueblo, New Mexico.

== Three Taos Pueblo painters ==
Albert Looking Elk, Albert Lujan, and Juan Mirabal have been identified as the "Three Taos Pueblo" painters. As the Taos art colony grew, these men studied oil and water color painting and made works of art about their community, from a Native American perspective. An exhibition of their work "Three Pueblo Painters" was held at the Harwood Museum of Art in Taos, New Mexico January 24 - April 20, 2003.

Occasionally Mirabal modeled for Taos artists. As an artist, he was a realist painter and muralist. His inspiration and subject matter was the pueblo, people and landscape of the Taos Pueblo lands. His was the longest painting career of the three men.

== Taos Pueblo ==
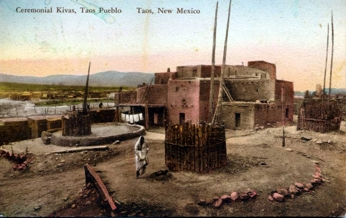
Taos Pueblo in pre-1923 postcard

Located in a tributary valley off the Rio Grande, Taos Pueblo is the northernmost of the New Mexico pueblos. For nearly a millennium, it has been occupied by the Taos tribe. It is estimated that the pueblo was built between 1000 and 1450 CE, with some later expansion. The Taos Pueblo is considered to be the oldest continuously inhabited community in the United States by Ancestral Puebloans. The Pueblo, at some places five stories high, is a combination of many individual homes with common walls. There are over 1,900 people in the Taos pueblo community. Some live in more modern homes near their fields, moving to the pueblo during cooler weather. There are about 150 people who live at the pueblo year-around. The Taos Pueblo became an UNESCO World Heritage Site in 1992, considered a significant world historical cultural landmark. Similar sites include the Taj Mahal in India, the Great Pyramids in Egypt, and the Grand Canyon in the United States.

For centuries, Pueblo painters have painted in tempera, clay slips, and earth pigments on woven textiles, interior walls, ceramics, and hides. Looking Elk, Albert Lujan, and Juan Mirabal adopted and mastered European painting materials and techniques.

== Beginning of his artistic career ==
Mirabal began painting under the tutelage of Marjorie Eaton and later after serving in the U.S. Army during WW II, studied in the late 1940s with Louis Leon Ribak, a Taos modernist painter who ran an art school after the end of World War II. Unlike other established painters from the Taos Pueblo, Mirabal was low-key. He did not have a shop in the pueblo, but he built a following of people who visited him and likely purchased his paintings.

== Professional career ==
Mirabal was ground-breaking in his realistic depiction of pueblo ceremonial dances. He was influenced by modern art and by the 1930s Cubism. Marjorie Eaton, a painter schooled in modernism in Europe, came to Taos in the late 1920s and lived there in the early 1930s. Of the same age, Eaton befriended Juan and he became her model, student and dear friend. She is the one who taught him the basics of modernism prior to his studies with Louis Leon Ribak. Mirabal painted many murals, a large mural still exists in a home that is now the Adobe & Pines Inn Bed & Breakfast. Mirabal is known for the liveliness that he brought to his work, both in composition and color.

Mirabal's Taos Pueblo painting inspired the following poem, by Enrique Pinedo, a student of Lawrence Intermediate School.

Taos Pueblo
The ground was rough under my feet.
The man was getting some wood.
The mountain looks like black paper.
The people look like Eskimos.
I smell honey in the village.
It sounds like drums beating and singing.
