= Albert Lujan =

American painter (1892–1948)

- Born: Xenaiua ("Weasel Arrow"); 1892; Taos Pueblo, New Mexico Territory
- Died: 1948 (aged 55–56); Taos Pueblo, New Mexico
- Education: self-taught
- Known for: Realisic paintings of Pueblo life: oil and watercolor paintings

Albert Lujan (1892–1948), also known as Xenaiua meaning "Weasel Arrow," was a genre and landscape painter from Taos Pueblo, New Mexico.

== Three Taos Pueblo painters ==
Albert Looking Elk, Albert Lujan, and Juan Mirabal have been identified as the "Three Taos Pueblo" painters. As the Taos art colony grew, these men studied oil and watercolor painting and made works of art of their community, told from a Native American perspective. An exhibition of their work "Three Pueblo Painters" was held at the Harwood Museum of Art in Taos January 24 – April 20, 2003.

== Taos Pueblo ==
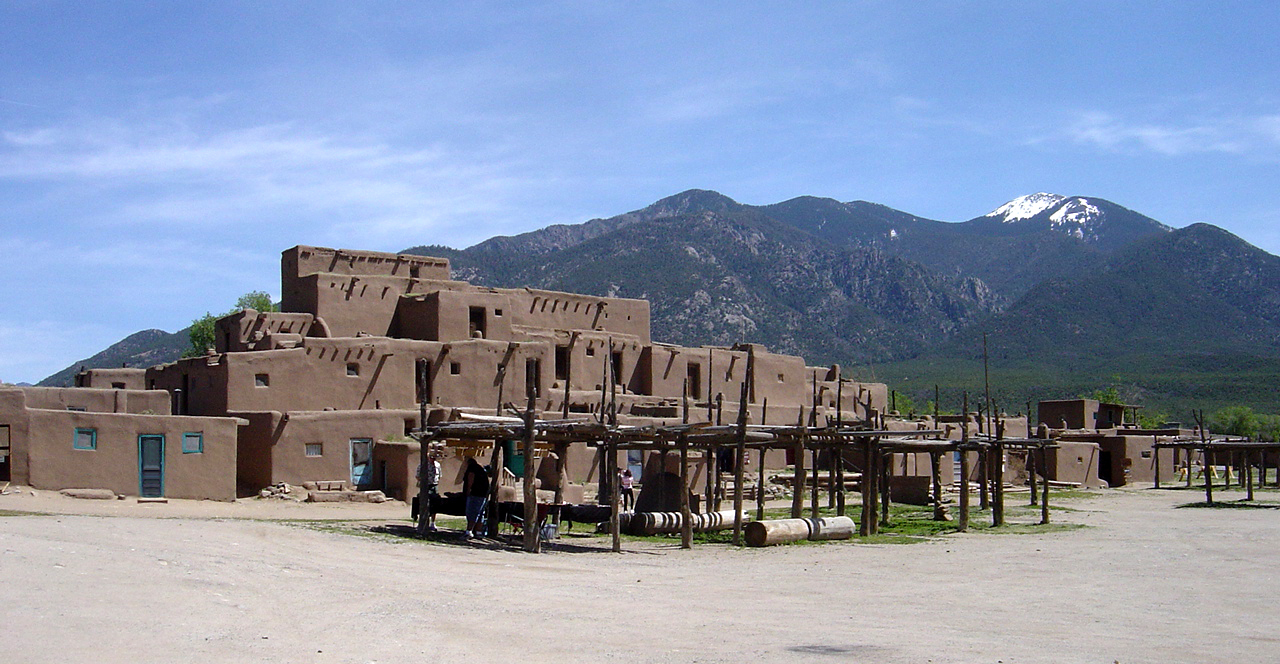
Taos Pueblo, photograph taken May 2005 by Bobak Ha'Eri

Located in a tributary valley off the Rio Grande, Taos Pueblo is the most northern of the New Mexico pueblos. For nearly a millennium, the Taos Indians have lived here. It is estimated that the pueblo was built between 1000 and 1450 CE, with some later expansion. The Taos Pueblo is considered to be the oldest continuously inhabited community in the United States. The Pueblo, at some places five stories high, is a combination of many individual homes with common walls. There are over 1,900 people in the Taos pueblo community. Some of them have more modern homes near their fields and stay at their homes on the pueblo during cooler weather. There are about 150 people who live at the pueblo year-around. The Taos Pueblo was added as an UNESCO World Heritage Site in 1992 as one of the most significant historical cultural landmarks in the world; Other sites include the Taj Mahal, Great Pyramids and the Grand Canyon in the United States.

For centuries, Pueblo painters have painted in tempera, clay slips, and earth pigments on woven textiles, interior walls, ceramics, and hides. Looking Elk, Albert Lujan, and Juan Mirabal adopted and mastered European painting materials and techniques.

== The beginning of his artistic career ==
Lujan started his adulthood as a farmer. He was also a church deacon. One day Lujan painted a landscape near the church where he had been doing some maintenance. A visitor noticed his painting on a scrap board and appreciated his work. He bought Lujan some painting supplies and purchased one or more of the resulting paintings.

== Professional career ==
Albert Lujan, largely self-taught, began painting around 1915. Throughout his career, he made over 2,000 oil and watercolor paintings. His hallmark was a drawing of an arrow. Lujan enjoyed painted in the plein air (open air) on the plaza. Often customers would purchase paintings they had seen painted. His sole source of inspiration and subject matter for his starkly realistic paintings was the Taos Pueblo village. The paintings were small souvenirs, sold for a modest price. As he was painting, his nephew, Bobby Lujan, a later famous hoop dancer, would charge visitors for his hoop dance performances. Whether Lujan painted the pueblo with or without people, there was little or no movement, portraying a timeless snapshot.
