= Albert Looking Elk =

American painter (c.1888–1940)

- Born: Albert Martinez, T'o'nu c. 1888; New Mexico Territory
- Died: November 30, 1940 (aged 51–52); New Mexico
- Known for: landscape, architectural, and mythological painting
- Notable work: View of Taos, Burrows at Taos Pueblo
- Awards: First place, SWAIA, 1923
- Elected: Governor of Taos Pueblo, 1938
- Patrons: Mary Cabot Wheelwright

Albert Looking Elk (c. 1888 – November 30, 1940), also known as Albert Martinez, was a Taos Pueblo painter. Looking Elk is one of the three Taos Pueblo Painters.

== Background ==
Albert, the son of José R. Martínez, was commonly known by his Taos name, T'o'nu, meaning "Looking Elk." He was born around 1888 in Taos Pueblo, New Mexico.

Albert Looking Elk was a model, initially reluctantly, to E. Irving Couse, one of the Taos Society of Artists founding members. He continued to model through his childhood and into adulthood; his wife and children also worked as models for artists. In 1900, he modeled for Oscar E. Berninghaus, one of the founding members of Taos Society of Artists. By 1915, after receiving a Christmas present of paints and brushes and painting lessons from Berninghaus, Looking Elk began his own art career.

Looking Elk was elected Governor of Taos Pueblo in 1938.

== Three Taos Pueblo painters ==
Albert Looking Elk, Albert Lujan, and Juan Mirabal have been identified as the "Three Taos Pueblo" painters. As the Taos art colony grew, these men studied oil and water color painting and made works of art of their community, told from a Native American perspective. An exhibition of their work "Three Pueblo Painters" was held at the Harwood Museum of Art in Taos in 2003.

== Taos Pueblo ==
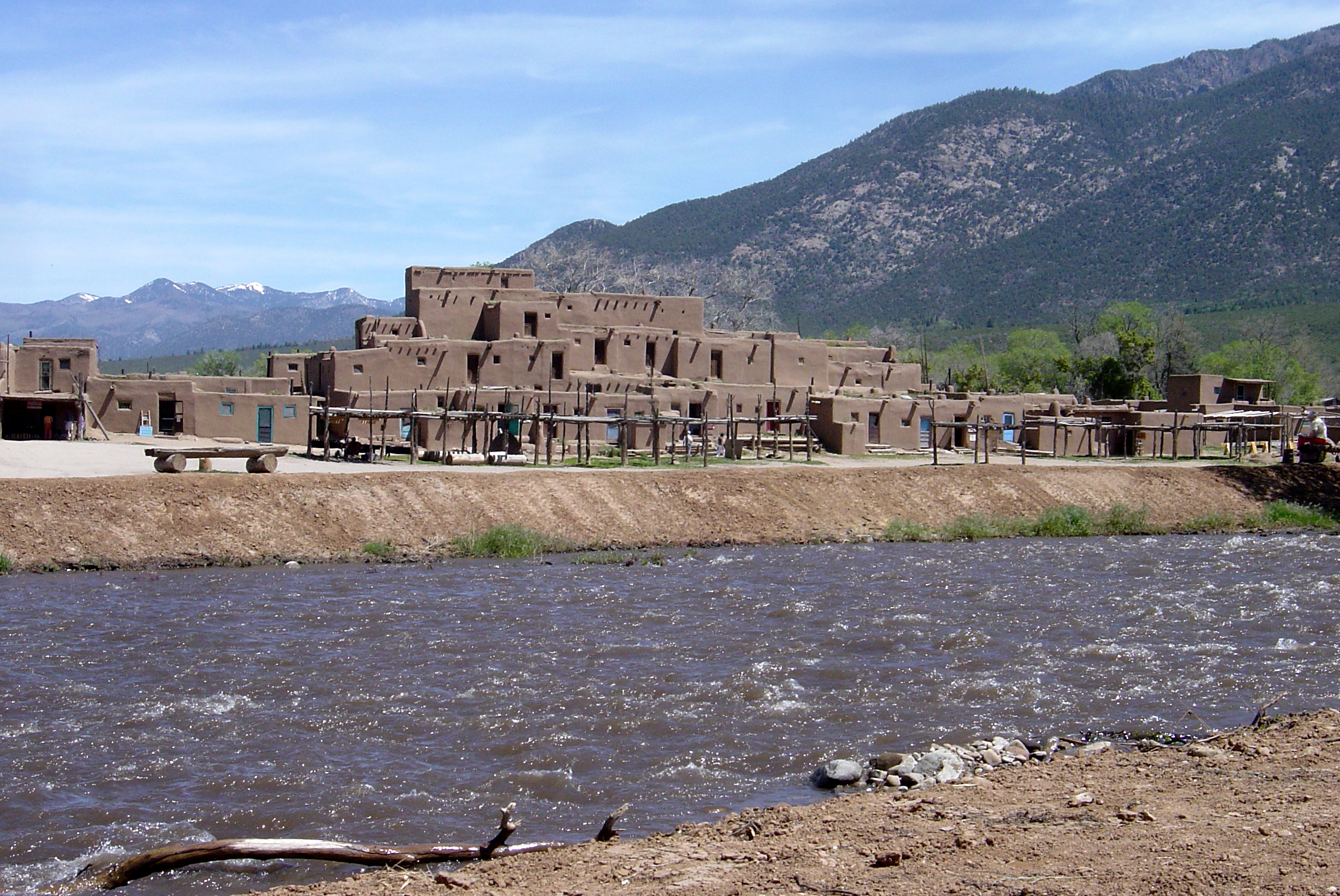
Taos Pueblo with Rio Pueblo in foreground, photograph taken May 2005 by Bobak Ha'Eri

Located in a tributary valley off the Rio Grande, Taos Pueblo is the most northern of the New Mexico pueblos. For nearly a millennium, the Taos Indians have lived here. It is estimated that the pueblo was built between 1000 and 1450 CE, with some later expansion. The Taos Pueblo is considered to be the oldest continuously inhabited community in the United States. The Pueblo, at some places five stories high, is a combination of many individual homes with common walls. There are over 1,900 people in the Taos pueblo community. Some of them have more modern homes near their fields and stay at their homes on the pueblo during cooler weather. There are about 150 people who live at the pueblo year-around. The Taos Pueblo was added as an UNESCO World Heritage Site in 1992 as one of the most significant historical cultural landmarks in the world; Other sites include the Taj Mahal, Great Pyramids and the Grand Canyon in the United States. For centuries, Pueblo painters have painted in tempera, clay slips, and earth pigments on woven textiles, interior walls, ceramics, and hides Looking Elk, Albert Lujan, and Juan Mirabal adopted and mastered European painting materials and techniques.

== The beginning of his artistic career ==
Looking Elk took art lessons and by 1917 received his first set of painting equipment of oils, easel, brushes and canvas from Oscar E. Berninghaus, a founding member of the Taos Society of Artists. The July 16, 1918, edition of the Taos Valley News said of him: "Taos has a native artist... Albert [Looking Elk] Martinez of the Pueblo... He has painted a number of pictures of merit, several of which he has been able to sell at a fair price." Like other beginning artists, at first Looking Elk made just a few dollars on his paintings, but he was so successful that he soon purchased a Studebaker. He was the first Taos Pueblo tribal member to purchase an automobile.

== Professional career ==
Looking Elk's primary source of inspiration and subjects were the Taos Pueblo. He featured the north building of the pueblo, often painting it from the village plaza. His works were realistic, as opposed to the romanticized compositions of the Taos Society of Artists. He was also influenced by the style of the Santa Fe Indian School, reflected in several of his works. Between 1923 and 1930 Looking Elk showed his work several times at the Museum of Fine Arts in Santa Fe, earning an art award during his first showing. His use of light and color has helped to make his artwork successful; however, Looking Elk's successful adoption of European painting techniques "offended many White collectors and curators of the day."

== Death ==
Albert Looking Elk died at Taos Pueblo on November 30, 1940, or as some sources list, 1941.
