= Cordelia Wilson =

American painter (1873–1953)

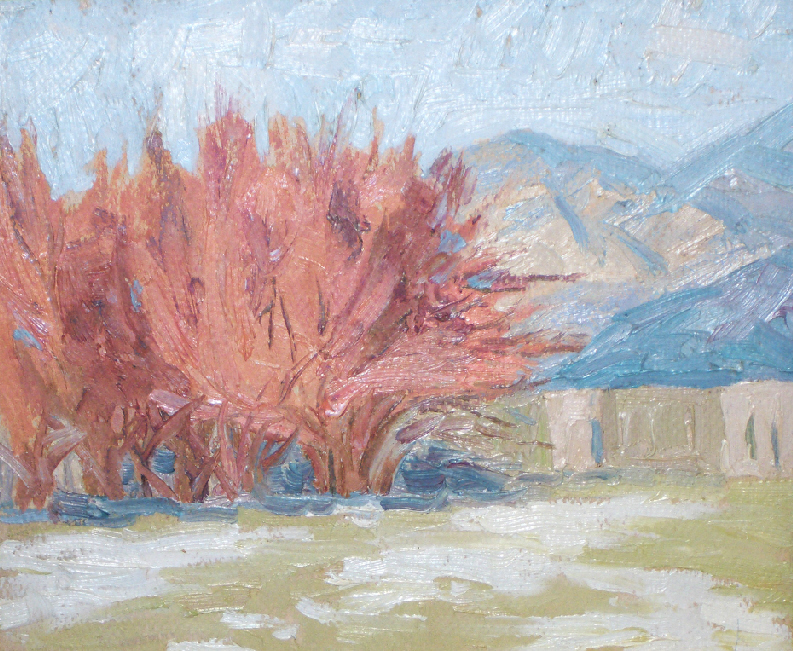
After the Snowfall, by Cordelia Wilson, ca. 1920s.

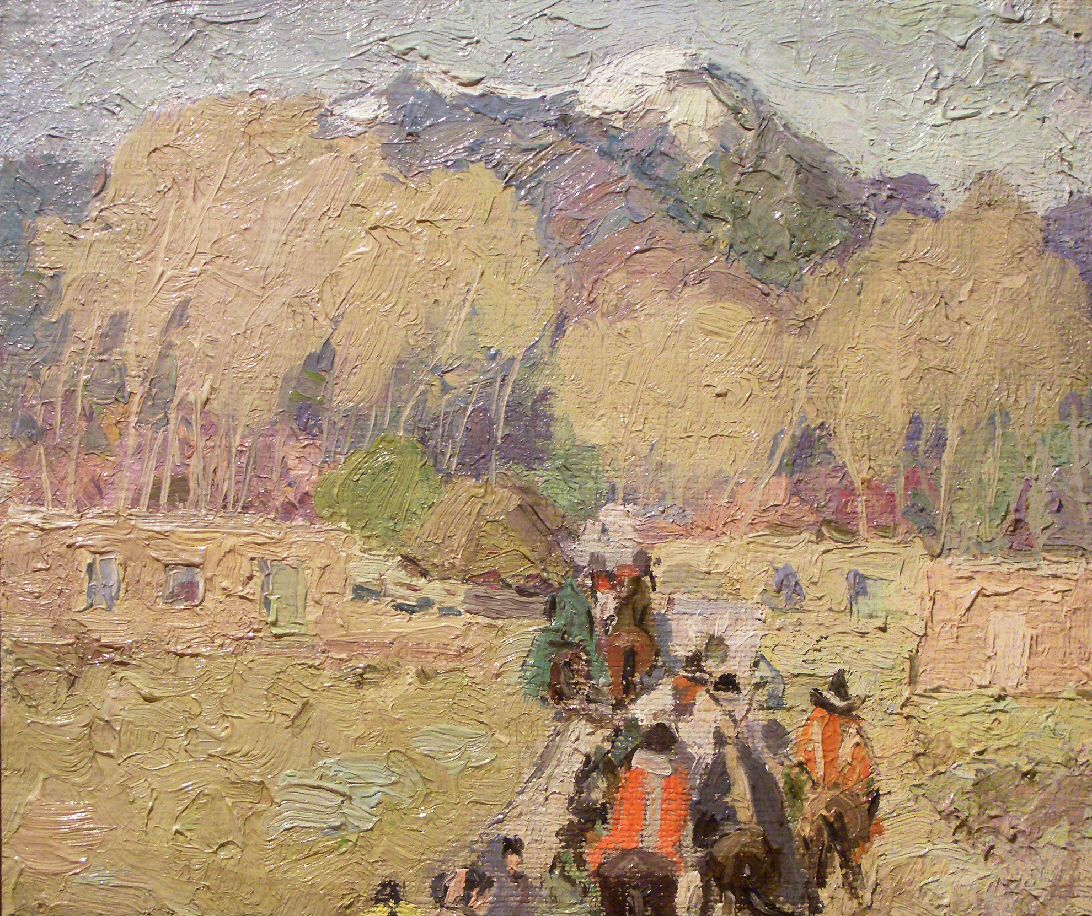
Taos Mountain, Trail Home, by Cordelia Wilson.

Cordelia Creigh Wilson (28 November 1873, Georgetown, Colorado – 7 June 1953, Seattle, Washington) was a painter noted for her landscapes of New Mexico and the American Southwest.

== Biography ==
Cordelia "Cordie" Creigh was born in Clear Creek County, Colorado. She was the only child of Thomas Creigh and Emma (Webb) Creigh. Her parents divorced when she was four years old, and she was raised by her mother with her step-siblings in Winfield, Kansas, and Colorado. She married Willard J. Wilkinson in Boulder, Colorado, in 1897 and gave birth to her only child, Louise, in Hayden the next year. However, after a period of separation, the couple divorced in 1910. Cordelia met John Henry Wilson and they married in Victoria, British Columbia in 1911, returning to Colorado soon thereafter.

Cordelia then began to seriously develop her skills as an artist motivated by the latest trends in American realism led by Robert Henri. Her academic training emphasized the development of an alla prima technique and painting out of doors, which inspired her to produce bold impasto works quickly. She started making road trips to New Mexico and became friends with painters in the Taos Society of Artists and the Santa Fe art colony. Her numerous expressive oil sketches and en plein air canvases of adobe dwellings and rugged landscapes caught the attention of art dealers.

She, her husband, and daughter settled on Tremont Street in Denver, Colorado, just around the corner from the J. Gibson Smith Gallery which displayed and sold her works. Many of her paintings had frames she hand-carved in rustic Arts and Crafts style and gilded with sheets of gold leaf.

In 1917, Cordelia Wilson was honored by having two paintings selected for the inaugural exhibition of the new New Mexico Museum of Art in Santa Fe. The show featured easel works by George Bellows, Robert Henri, F. Martin Hennings, and Leon Kroll, who were working in the Southwest at that time, along with the "Taos Six" (Oscar E. Berninghaus, Ernest Blumenschein, Irving Couse, Herbert Dunton, Bert Geer Phillips, and Joseph Henry Sharp) and other members of the Taos Society. One of her paintings exhibited in the show, A Mexican Home, was reproduced in the January–February 1918 issue of the journal Art and Archaeology (published by the Archaeological Institute of America) that featured a cover article about the museum's opening.

Among Cordelia Wilson's largest landscapes is a 50" x 70" canvas, created for World War I military training. It was exhibited at the School of American Research of Santa Fe in 1917 with other large-scale so-called "range finder" paintings by Blumenschein, Berninghaus, Phillips, Gustave Baumann, Walter Ufer, Leon Gaspard, and others. They had been commissioned by the U.S. Army based on a proposal by the Salmagundi Club of New York, whose members wanted to make a special contribution to America’s war effort. When the show closed, the works on display were shipped to Camp Funston at Fort Riley, Kansas and Camp Cody at Deming, New Mexico. The paintings were used for indoor instruction in range finding, topographical quizzes, and map drawing at Army camps.

John Wilson, her husband, contracted tuberculosis in about 1921. The couple moved to Seattle for his treatment at a sanitorium, where he died the following year. In 1923, Cordelia married for a third time to John N. Fahnestock, but this marriage ended in divorce in 1928. Cordelia continued to reside in Pacific Northwest producing still lifes, florals, and scenes of the Puget Sound region, although she periodically traveled, worked, and displayed her art in the Southwest.

Cordelia Wilson died at age 79 and she is buried in the Wilson family plot at Lake View Cemetery in Seattle. Notable paintings may be found in the holdings of museum and private collections.

== Gallery ==
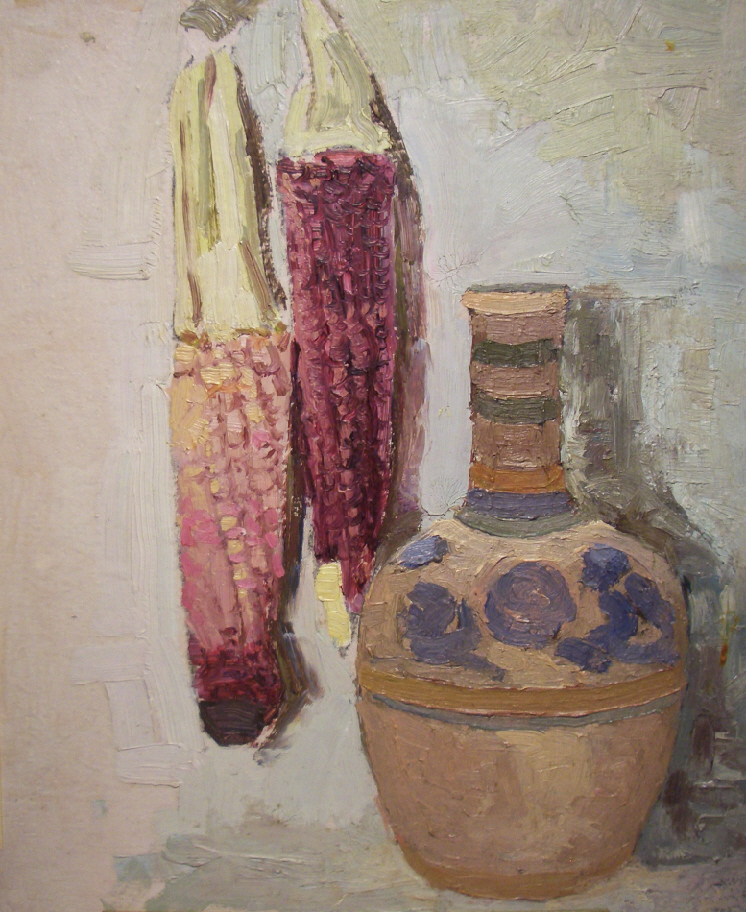
Indian Corn and Mexican Vase c. 1915-1920

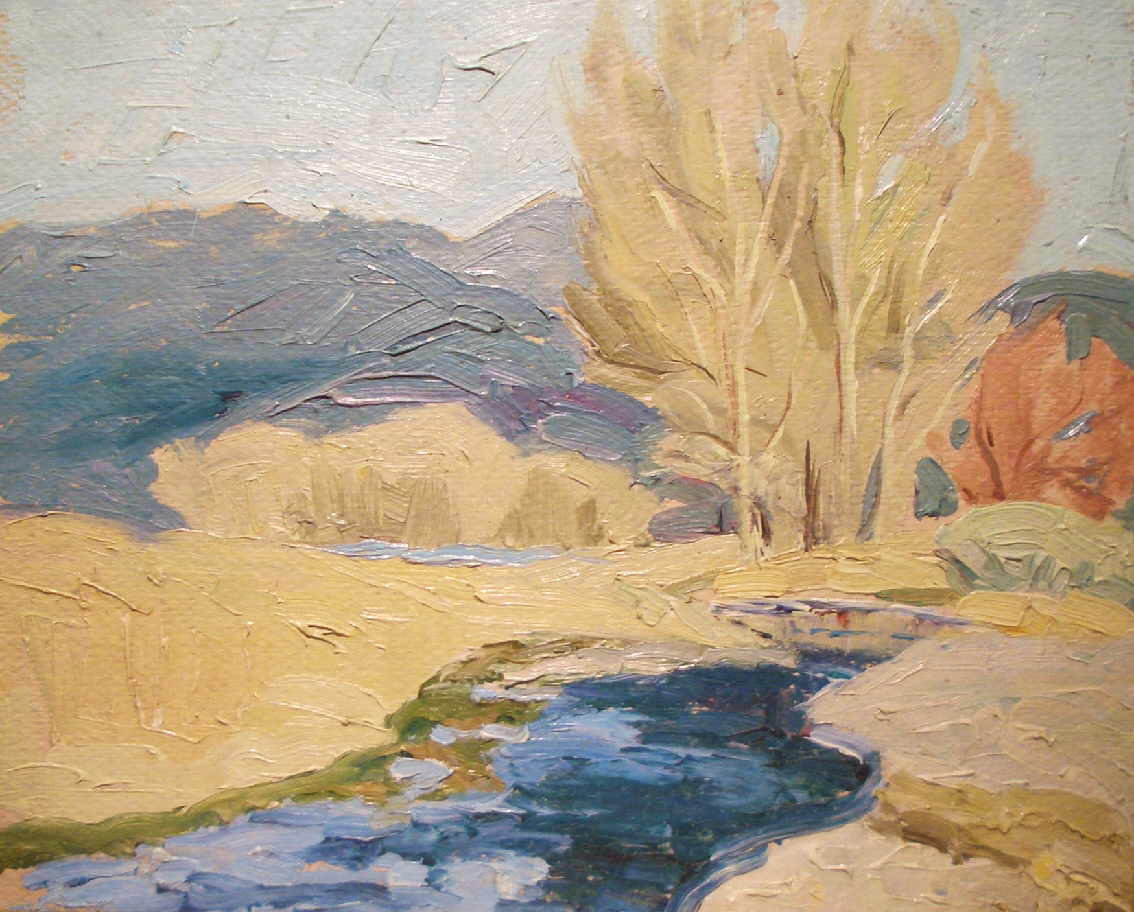
Autumn in the
Sangre de Cristos

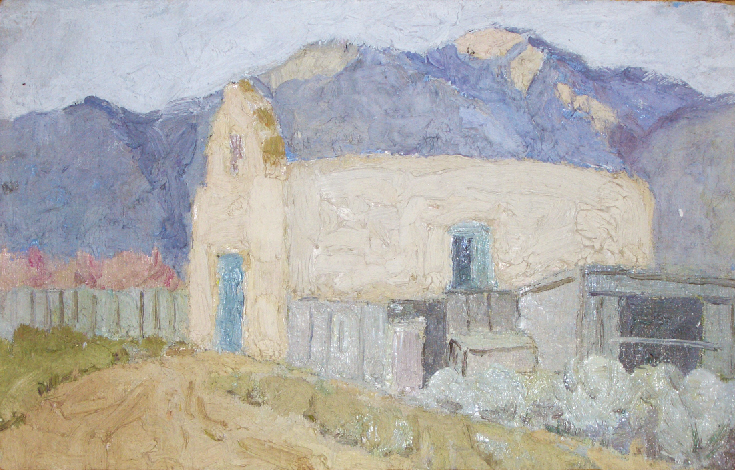
Adobe Church,
c. 1920s

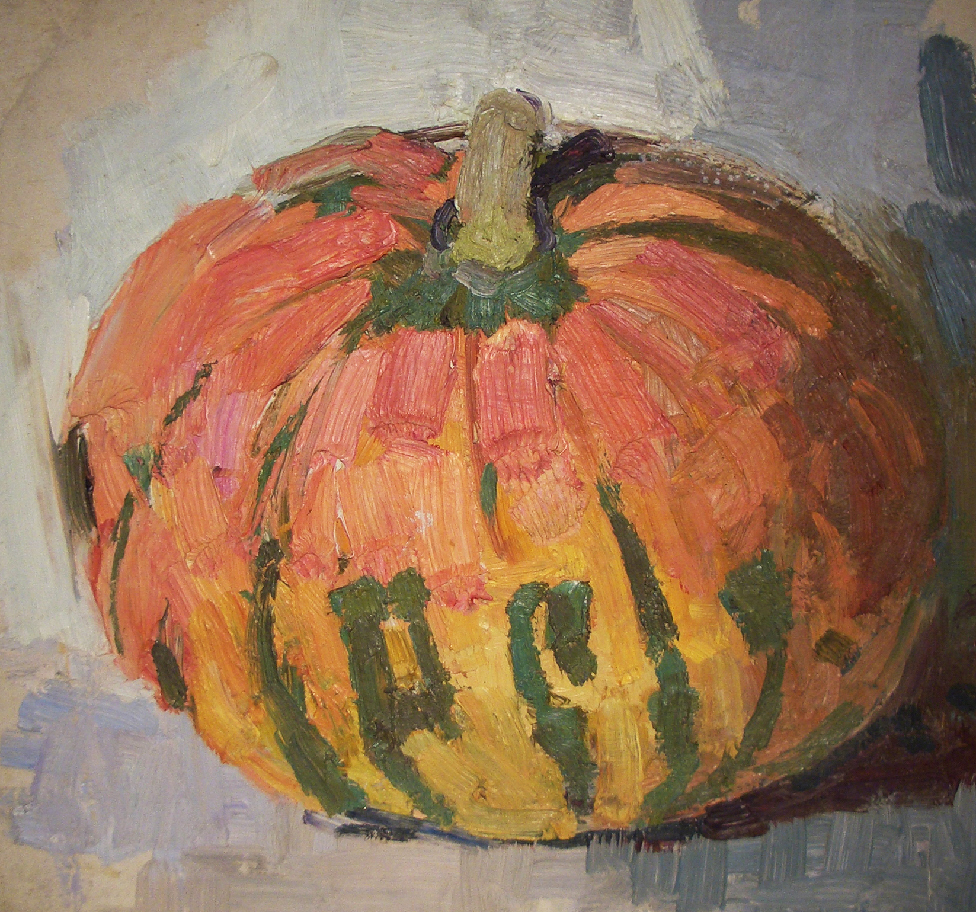
Orange Gourd
c. 1915-1920

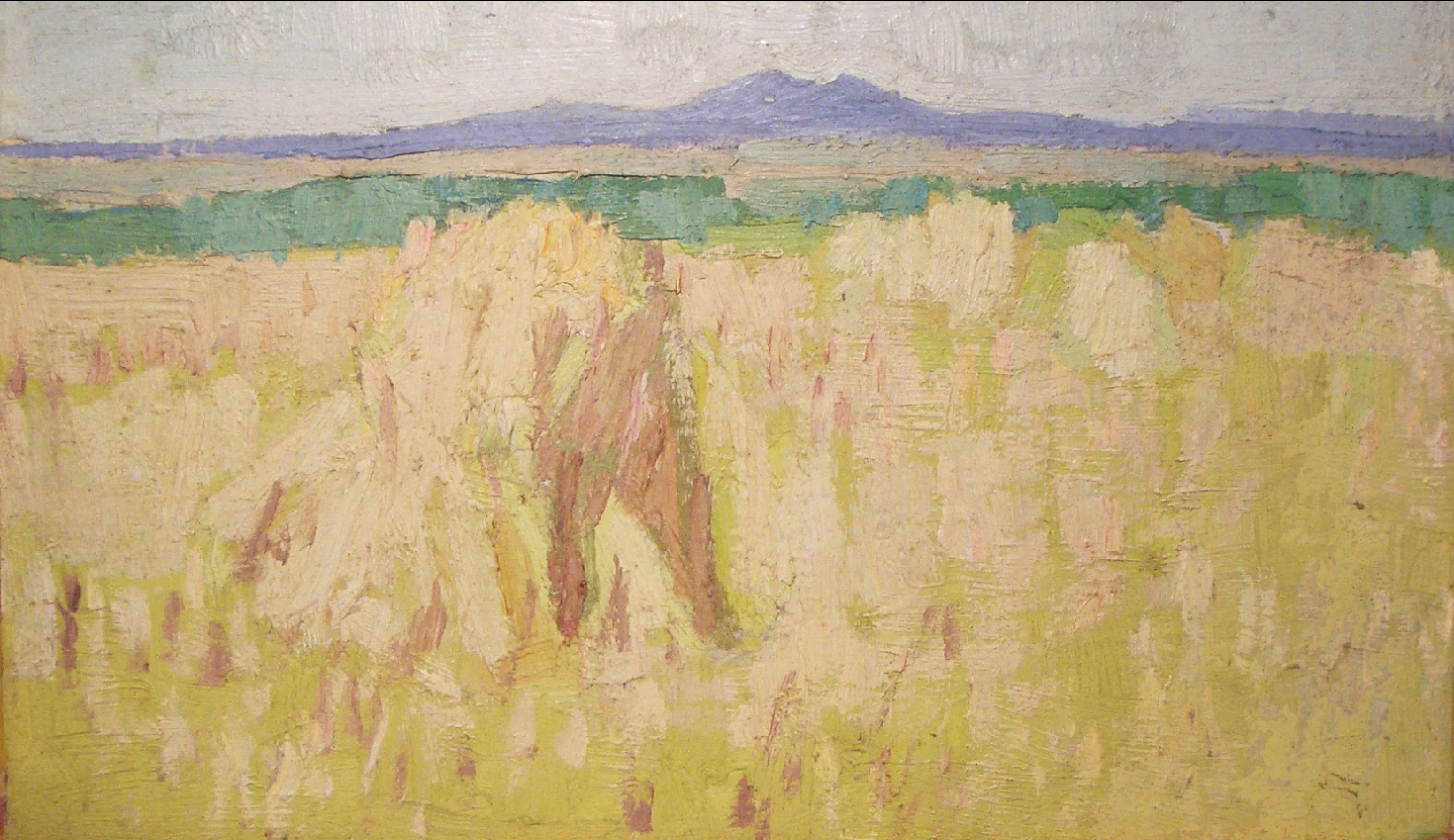
Green River Gorge, Taos
c. 1915-1920
