= Colcha embroidery =

Form of surface embroidery found in the southwest United States

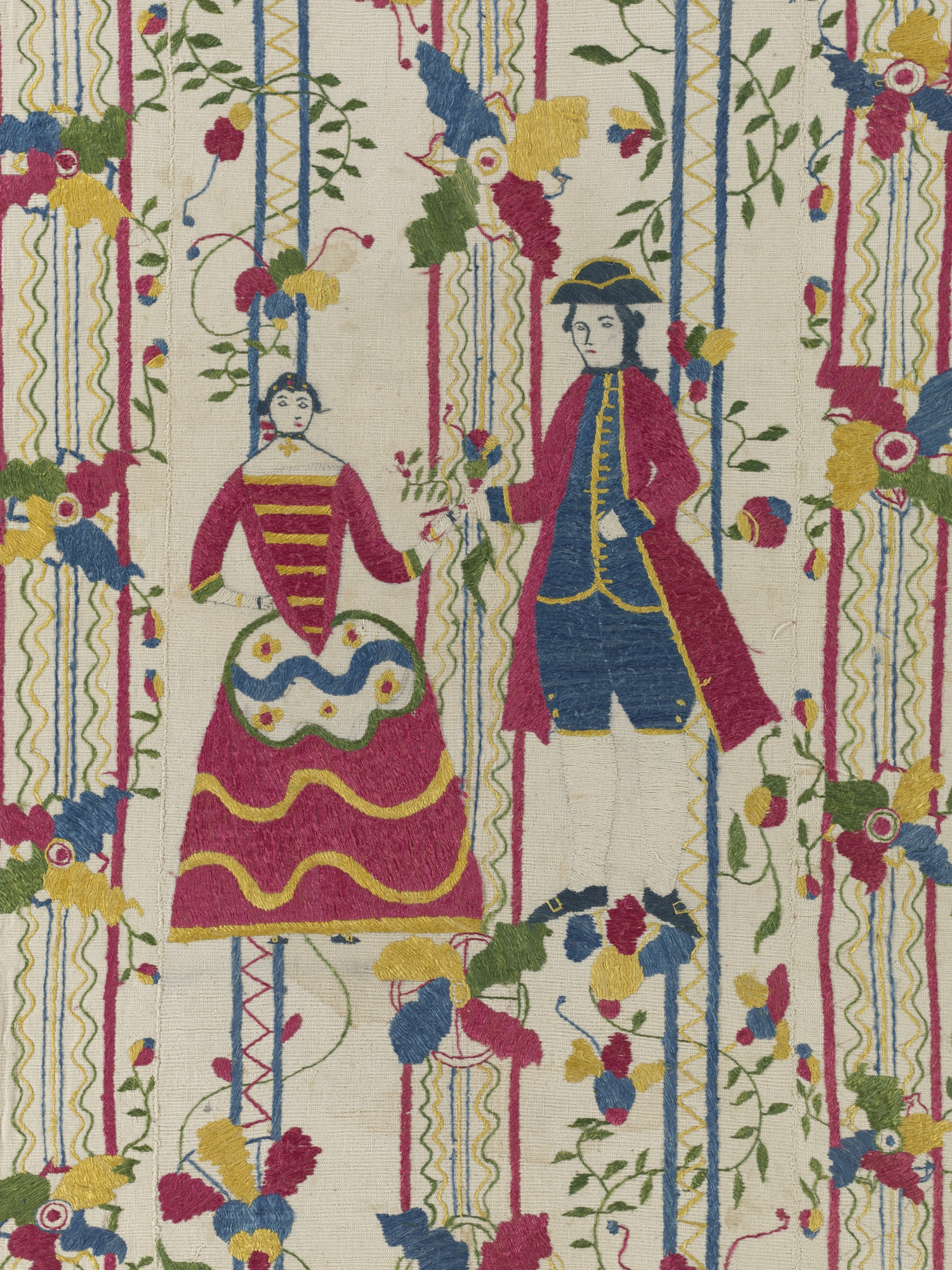
Embroidered coverlet, 1786

Colcha embroidery from the southwest United States is a form of surface embroidery that uses wool threads on cotton or linen fabric. During the Spanish Colonial period, the word colcha referred to a densely embroidered wool coverlet. In time, the word also came to refer to the embroidery stitch that was used for these coverlets, and then began to be used on other surfaces. The colcha stitch is self-couched, with threads applied at a 45-degree angle to tie down the stitch. Originally, the wool threads were dyed naturally, using plants or insects, such as cochineal. Both materials used and design motifs have varied over time.

== History ==
The origins of colcha embroidery are uncertain. One theory is that it developed from Chinese silk embroidery that had been imported into Mexico. Colcha embroidery includes designs that resemble Mexican and Spanish embroidery worked in linen and silk. However, the origins and use of the colcha stitch may be more pragmatic. It is an economical stitch. It covers a large area of the base cloth quickly, and it saves yarn, with little waste on the back of the fabric.

An early record of colcha embroidery appears in a list of furnishings of Spanish chapels, churches, and Indian missions in New Mexico. This list was put together by Fray Francisco Dominguez in 1776. Included in the list is a colcha-embroidered coverlet which features whte flowers on a dark background.

Early colcha embroidery, during the Spanish colonial period, involved wool threads on wool fabric. Coverlets were often made on sabanilla, a cloth that was hand spun and handwoven. The wool threads were spun from the fleece of the churro sheep found in the area. The embroidery was frequently so densely worked that the item resembled a carpet or tapestry. The wool on wool combination of materials was used through the mid 1800s, at which point stitching on cotton became more common. The cotton fabric used, as well as plied wool yarns, were commercially produced, and arrived from the east via the Santa Fe Trail. Also arriving were samples of crewelwork and later commercial patterns and stencils. These encouraged embroiderers to use a wider range of stitches, and also led to less engagement with traditional colcha. It was only in the 20th century that there was a resurgence in colcha embroidery.

== Colcha stitch ==
The colcha stitch is known in many parts of the world, under names such as the bokhara couching stitch, convent stitch, Deerfield stitch, and figure stitch. It has been found on 18th century quilts, as well as wall hangings and altar cloths in a region encompassing northern New Mexico and southern Colorado. This stitch covers large areas easily, and can curve and move in any direction needed. Subtle shading and texture are possible, and epitomize colcha embroidery.

== Designs ==
Early designs from the 1840s had small motifs, checks or flowers. Stripes became popular in the 1860s and 1870s, some of which were in the form of zigzags. Diaper patterns are also found. For those items worked in sections, the same design is repeated. Unlike New England surface embroidery, scrolls designs are less popular. After the Spanish colonial period, the designs changed, with vines, buffalo, birds and deer becoming more frequent. Christian devotional images are also used.
