= Ernest Martin Hennings =

American painter (1886–1956)

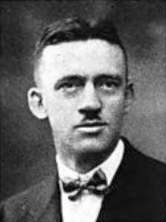
- Born: February 5, 1886; Penns Grove, New Jersey, US
- Died: May 19, 1956 (aged 70); Taos, New Mexico, US
- Education: School of the Art Institute of Chicago; Academy of Fine Arts, Munich
- Known for: Landscape and portrait painting
- Movement: Taos Society of Artists

Ernest Martin Hennings (February 5, 1886 – May 19, 1956) was an American artist and member of the Taos Society of Artists.

== Biography ==
E. Martin Hennings was born in Penns Grove, New Jersey on February 5, 1886 to German immigrant parents. Two years after he was born, Hennings' father moved his family to Chicago.

Looking back on his early exposure to art and his decision to pursue a life as an artist, Hennings remarked; "It was rather strange that I chose painting for my profession, for practically none of my family showed any artistic tendencies. It happened that when I was 12 or 13 years old, another lad and myself wandered into the Art Institute of Chicago and it was during that visit that I determined to become an artist. That day I secured a pamphlet that showed me that art could be studied. That had never occurred to me."

It was in 1901 that Hennings began taking classes at the School of the Art Institute of Chicago, which was largely based on the great European art schools and made particularly emphasis on the importance of drawing. On June 17, 1904, he graduated from the school with honors, but continued to study there for another two years, mostly under the instruction of John Vanderpoel.

Hennings eventually took up work as a commercial artist, mostly painting murals and portraits around Chicago. Murals on which Hennings worked, usually on canvas panels, include one for the cafeteria at the Art Institute of Chicago, the Florentine Ballroom at the Congress Plaza Hotel in Chicago, and The Ascension, a mural painted for the Grace Episcopal Cathedral in Topeka, Kansas.

== Europe ==
Out of a desire to return to fine art painting, he re-enrolled at the School of the Art Institute of Chicago, and soon entered, in 1912, a painting in a competition at the Ecole des Beaux-Arts in Paris, for which he won second prize. He soon enrolled at the Academy of Fine Arts, Munich in Germany, under the direction of Angelo Junk, Walter Thor, and Franz von Stuck, who was particularly influential on the painter. In January 1914, Hennings became a member of the American Artists Club in Munich, Germany with Victor Higgins and Walter Ufer, who would both later become fellow Taos Society of Artists.

Before World War I escalated, Hennings relocated back to his hometown of Chicago and initially resided at the Fine Arts Building on Michigan Ave, where Louis Grell joined him for a short period before the two moved studios to the famous Tree Studio artist colony in Chicago's North side. At this time Hennings also joined the artist run Palette and Chisel Academy of Fine Art, and by 1916 had already gained respect in Chicago with a number of awards, including a Gold Medal from the Palette and Chisel Club as well as the Englewood Women's Club prize at the Art Institute of Chicago.

== New Mexico ==
Hennings soon attracted the attention of a number of Chicago businessmen and art patrons, including Carter H. Harrison, Jr. Harrison offered to sponsor a trip for Hennings to visit and paint in Taos, New Mexico, in exchange for the works he completed during his stay. Hennings was not the first to receive such a proposition; Walter Ufer and Victor Higgins had both been approached by Harrison three years earlier, and soon settled permanently in the Southwest.

Hennings accepted the patron's proposition and spent the summer and fall of 1917 in and around Taos. Harrison supplied Hennings with an introduction to the newly created New Mexico Museum of Art in Santa Fe, New Mexico. For the inaugural exhibition at the museum Hennings exhibited three paintings. In that year, 1917, Hennings exhibited his first painting in the United States, outside of Chicago, at the National Academy of Design in New York City.

Although Hennings soon traveled back to Chicago to continue his work as a commercial artist, three years later he moved permanently to Taos. His new home allowed Hennings to expand past the limitations of commercial art, to paint freely. In particular, the artist was able to travel around the area surrounding Taos freely, painting en plein air subjects of intense natural beauty in remarkable light, none of which would have been possible in Chicago. In part due to his academic education, Hennings' primary interest was in portrait painting, with his primary subject being the Native Americans living in and around Taos Pueblo.

While continuing to paint predominantly in the Southwest, Hennings frequently exhibited in Chicago. In 1922 he was awarded the Clyde M. Carr Prize from the Art Institute of Chicago as well as the Institute's Fine Arts Building Prize. The following year his success in his hometown continued with the Martin B. Cahn Prize, again from the Art Institute of Chicago, for his painting The Twins.

== Taos Society of Artists ==
Such accolades contributed to Hennings' reputation and, also in 1923, the painter was nominated by Oscar E. Berninghaus and Walter Ufer for membership in the Taos Society of Artists. However, he was not elected a member that year, but was re-nominated the following year and, this time, received a unanimous vote. Catharine Carter Critcher was accepted for membership at the same meeting.

During one trip back to Illinois, in 1924, Hennings met Helen Otte, an employee at the Chicago department store Marshall Field's. The two were married just two years later, on July 20, 1926, and travelled extensively through Europe for 16 months for their honeymoon, visiting Italy, France, Spain, and Morocco.

In the years before he was married, Hennings completed his first prints, eight lithographs of various Southwestern subjects. The prints were made on zinc plates and printed in Chicago. Six of the lithographs; Across the Sage, The Frozen Stream, Through Sage and Cedar, Indian Bake Ovens, Beneath the Cottonwoods, and The Hunters, were first printed in an edition of 50, and later in a second edition of 100. The prints Taos Indian and Indian Maiden were produced in a more limited number. Hennings only completed one other print project, which consisted of four monotypes.

Feeling that the organization had run its course and achieved its purpose, the Taos Society of Artists disbanded in 1927. It had grown to include some of the nation's most accomplished painters, including Joseph Henry Sharp, Ernest Blumenschein, Bert G. Phillips, Oscar E. Berninghaus, E. Irving Couse, W. Herbert Dunton, Walter Ufer, Victor Higgins, and Kenneth Miller Adams.

== Mature career ==
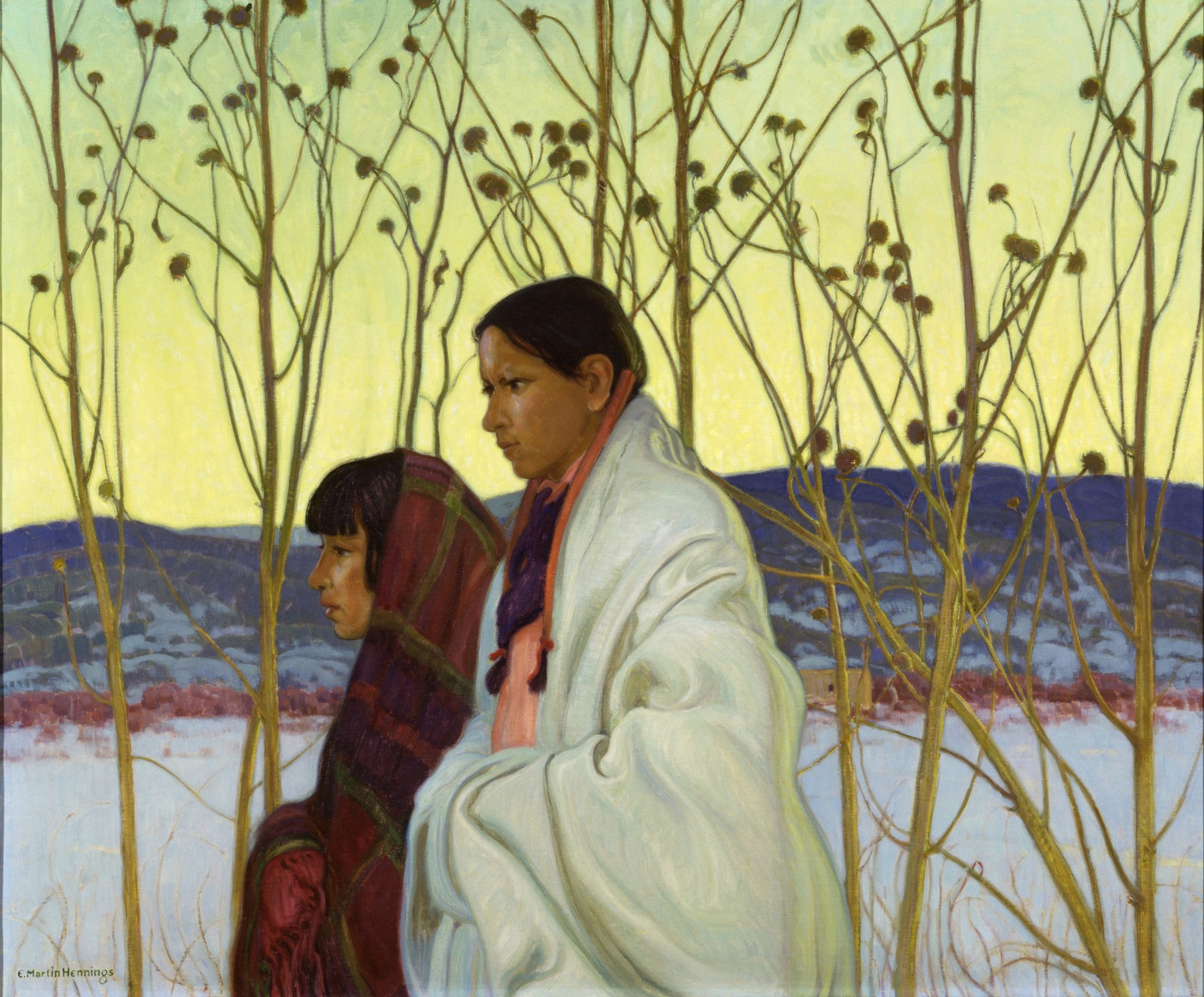
E. Martin Hennings, Homeward Bound, 1933-1934, oil on canvas, Smithsonian American Art Museum, Transfer from the U.S. Department of Labor, 1964.1.62SAAM-1964.1.62 1

By the 1920s, the now established painter was building his reputation on the national scene, with exhibitions and awards including; the Walter Lippincott Prize at the Pennsylvania Academy of Fine Arts (1925), the lsidor Medal and the Ranger Fund Purchase prizes at the National Academy of Design in New York (1926), the Harry Frank Prize from the Art Institute of Chicago (1927), exhibited at the Corcoran Gallery of Art (1928 and 1933), and won first prize at the 1929 Texas Wildflower Competition. Hennings's success was not limited to the United States, however, and he was included in the 1924 Venice Biennale, the International Exhibition in Paris in 1926, and the 1927 Paris Salon.

Many art collectors throughout America sought out his paintings. Such private patrons included Carter H. Harrison, Jr., Oscar F. Mayer, Robert McKee, and Lutcher Stark. Hennings also received support from the Public Works of Art Project and the Section of Painting and Sculpture, which commissioned the mural The Chosen Site in a Van Buren, Arkansas, post office. The Atchison, Topeka and Santa Fe Railroad also broadly supported his work, including commissioning specific works for advertisements, and remained a supporter of Hennings throughout his career.

== Death and legacy ==
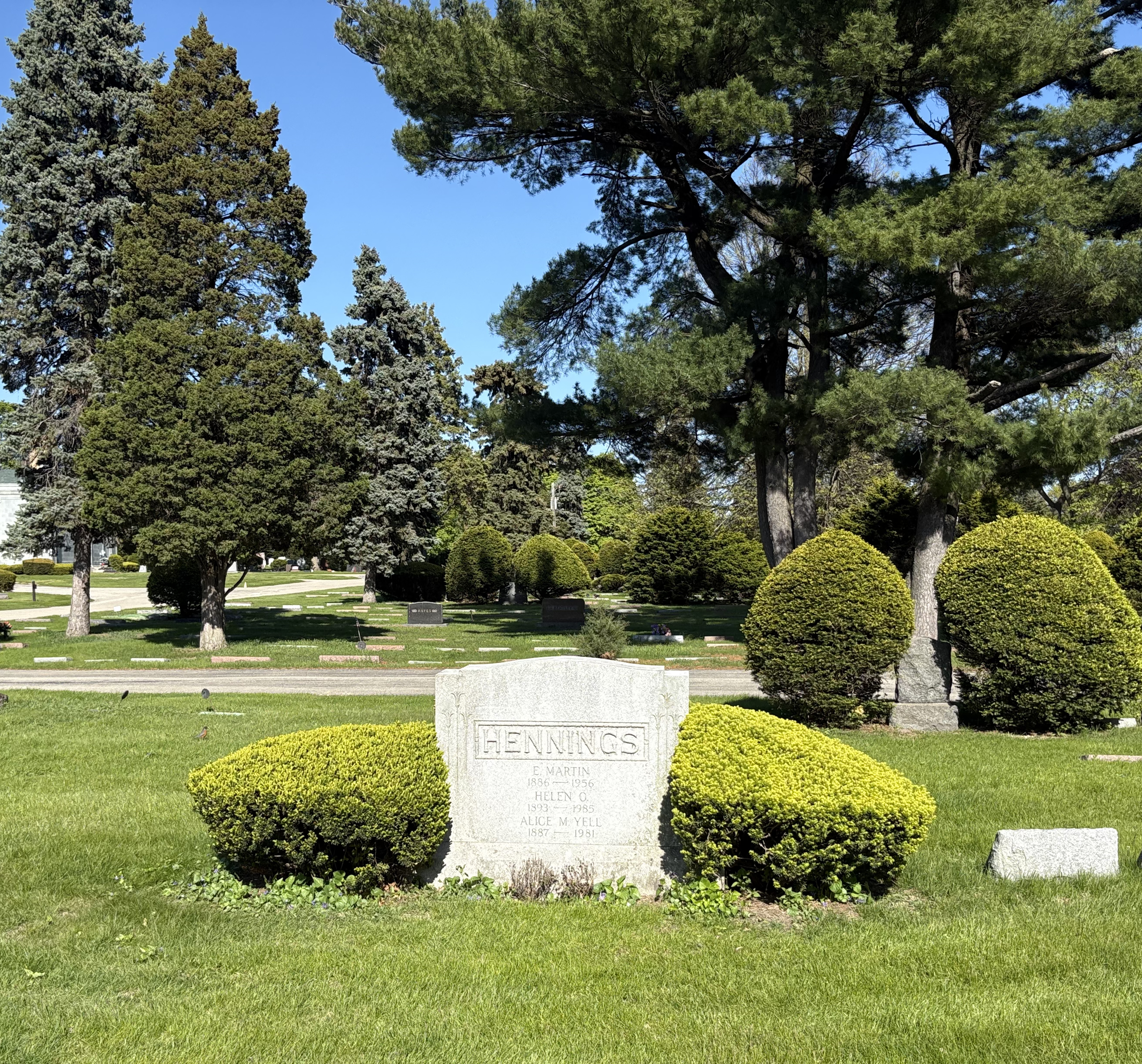
Hennings's grave at Memorial Park Cemetery

E. Martin Hennings died May 19, 1956. He was buried at Memorial Park Cemetery in Skokie, north of his hometown of Chicago, rather than his adopted town of Taos, New Mexico.

Today paintings by Hennings are housed in the following museums; the Smithsonian American Art Museum, Stark Museum of Art, Booth Western Art Museum, C.M. Russell Museum, Denver Art Museum, Eiteljorg Museum of American Indians and Western Art, Gilcrease Museum, New Mexico Museum of Art, National Cowboy and Western Heritage Museum, Rockwell Museum, Museum of Fine Arts, Houston, National Museum of Wildlife Art, and Woolaroc Museum.

The E. Martin Hennings House and Studio Historic District in Taos is listed on the National Register of Historic Places.
