= American Artists Club =

- Formation: January 1914
- Founder: 16
- Type: Private art group
- Purpose: To assist American students of the fine arts in Munich
- Headquarters: Kiinstler Cafe Glasl, Munich
- Leader: Herbert E. Martin

The American Artists Club was a private art group for American artists living and working in Munich, Germany. It was started in January 1914, just before World War I broke out. The private group met every Friday evening at the Kiinstler Cafe Glasl at the corners of Theresien and Amalien Streets. There were sixteen founding members of the art colony including E. Martin Hennings, Victor Higgins, Walter Ufer, Louis Grell, J. Ernst Dean, Herbert Martin, John M. Imhof, Bennet S. Linder, O. R. Korder, Richard Fayerweather Babcock, Frank Duveneck, Carl Bohnen, Emil Frie, Carl Hoeckner and others.

The following extract is from; American Federation of Arts. (1914) American Art Directory. New York: R.R. Bowker p. 352 Europe.

Germany American Artists' Club, Munich

Herbert E. Martin President Ernest Dean Treasurer

Bennet S. Linder Vice-Pres. E. Martin Hennings Secretary

Organized January, 1914, to assist American students of the fine arts in Munich. Membership is composed of students; those interested in art are associate members. An exhibition of the work by members was announced for March, 1914, at Brakl's Gallery.

Most members fled Germany as the onset of war loomed and the USA's involvement became more certain. Many of the original founding members ended up in Chicago affiliated with the Art Institute of Chicago and exhibited together frequently.

Members E. Martin Hennings, Walter Ufer and Victor Higgins went on to become early members of the Taos Society of Artists.

== References and sources ==
- Original photograph of club with founding sixteen members shown, with seven of the artists' signatures on reverse, The Louis Grell Family collection, Council Bluffs, IA
