= Louis Grell =

American painter

Louis Frederick Grell
- Self Portrait ca 1916
- Born: Ludwig Heinrich Grell, III; November 30, 1887; Council Bluffs, Iowa
- Died: November 21, 1960 (aged 72); Chicago, IL
- Education: School of Applied Arts Hamburg, Royal Academy of Fine Arts, Munich, Ludwig-Maximilians-Universität München
- Known for: composition and portrait painter
- Notable work: Murals inside Chicago Theatre, Netherland Plaza Hotel, Northwestern Military Academy, Notre Dame de Chicago, Union Station St. Louis
- Spouse: Fredricka Seammers
- Awards: Harry Frank prize Art Institute of Chicago 1930, Municipal Art League prize AIC 1936
- Patrons: Charles L. Hutchison, Ruth Van Sickle Ford

Louis Frederick Grell (30 November 1887 – 21 November 1960) was an American figure composition and portrait artist based in the Tree Studio resident artist colony in Chicago, Illinois. He received his formal training in Europe from 1900 through 1915 and later became art professor at the Chicago Academy of Fine Arts from 1916 to 1922, and at the Art Institute of Chicago from 1922 to 1934. Grell exhibited his works throughout Europe from 1905 to 1915, in San Francisco in 1907, and in Chicago at the Art Institute 25 times from 1917 to 1941. He exhibited in New York in 1915 and 1916 and in Philadelphia and Washington, D.C. Primarily an allegorical and figurative composition muralist and portrait painter, his creative strokes adorn the ceilings and walls of numerous US National Historic Landmark buildings.

== Early life ==
He was born in Council Bluffs, Iowa, to German emigrant meat market owners, and remained until the age of 12, when in May 1900, his parents decided to send him to Hamburg, Germany, to study art. Grell's first two years were spent refining his understanding of the German language. He then began a three-year study of the fundamentals of painting in Altona, Germany. Soon after, he was accepted to the prestigious School of Applied Arts in Hamburg, where young student Grell and Professor Switz earned commissions together to paint murals inside the famous Hamburg Boathouse (the great meeting place for all of Northern Germany), Hamburg Music Hall and elaborate paintings for the home of Germany's wealthiest man, "Budge, the Turpentine King". Grell's work at the Academy would earn him praise in 1906 at the Third German Arts & Crafts Exhibition in Dresden.

== Training ==
For Grell, earning top student honors of 3,000 students from 1905 to 1907 at the School of Applied Arts in Hamburg meant the Hamburg School would sponsor him at the Royal Academy of Fine Arts, Munich, under Franz von Stuck, Carl von Marr and Angelo Jank, from 1908 through 1912 (1907, June 2. Omaha World Herald). Grell also attended the Ludwig-Maximilians-Universität München. While in Munich, Grell was a member of the famed American Artists Club with fellow members E. Martin Hennings, Walter Ufer, Emil Frei, Victor Higgins – a total of sixteen members are photographed attending Friday evening meetings at Club Glasl in Munich. Upon completion of his formal studies in Germany, Grell traveled Europe studying at major art centers, painting and exhibiting his works throughout Europe.

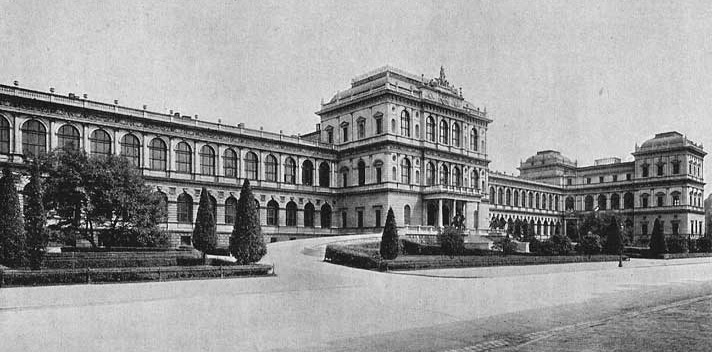
Royal Academy of Fine Arts, Munich, Germany

In May 1907, after Grell had completed his art training in Hamburg, he returned to America to visit family in Council Bluffs, Iowa. At the age of 19, on a late summer family vacation to Salt Lake City, Utah, Grell took over a failed mural commission depicting the 1847 entry of the Mormons into Emigration Canon. The mural was commissioned for the Manufacturers Hall exhibit in downtown Salt Lake City under preparations for the Utah State Fair of 1907. Grell won top prize at the fair and earned numerous other commissions while in Salt Lake City from August to November. Grell hired two assistants and took three months to finish the paintings. One large work eventually ended up on exhibit in San Francisco in the fall of 1907.

Upon completion of his extended stay in the US, Grell returned to Germany, this time enrolling in the Royal Academy of Fine Arts in March 1908 where he remained until 1910. When America's involvement in World War I became certain, Grell was forced to escape Europe in 1914 through Norway and landed his first American artistic position as a stage set designer for large Broadway productions in New York City in 1915. By early fall of 1916, the Chicago Academy of Fine Arts offered Grell a position as art instructor. Grell family archives, specifically a postcard sent to family by Grell (personal communication #1, October 28, 1916), show Grell as rooming with fellow Munich artist and friend E. Martin Hennings in studio #14 at the Fine Arts Building in Chicago. Both artists would eventually relocate to their own studios in the famous Tree Studio art colony in Chicago's near north side. Grell would live at Tree Studios in Chicago from 1917 until his death in 1960.

== Chicago ==
Grell was the main art instructor at the Chicago Academy of Fine Arts from 1916 to 1922 where one of his students was animator and cartoonist, Walt Disney. In 1917, Elias Disney relocated his family back to Chicago where Walt Disney attended McKinley High School during the day and took art classes at night at the Chicago Academy of Fine Arts under Grell in 1917 and 1918.

Grell would later recount the Walt Disney days to family members as Walt Disney's fame grew, but never talked about this outside the family. Recent Grell Family archives uncovered aided in proving this claim, but the real help came in the summer of 2012, when Dianne Disney Miller, eldest daughter of Walt Disney, authorized the release of Walt Disney transcripts from the Illinois Board of Higher Education to the Louis Grell Family in Council Bluffs, Iowa.

In 1922, Grell was recruited by Director Charles L. Hutchison of the Art Institute of Chicago to become art instructor at the famous School of the Art Institute of Chicago and would remain until 1934 when Grell would embark on a solo career as a portrait and mural painter. Grell exhibited 25 times at the Art Institute of Chicago from 1917 until 1941 winning top honors. Grell won the coveted Harry Frank prize for figure composition in 1930 with his large painting titled "Destiny" at the Art Institute of Chicago and the Municipal Art League prize for portraiture in 1936 for "Portrait of the Painter, Moessel" at the Art Institute of Chicago. Grell also exhibited heavily throughout Chicago and in New York, San Francisco, Philadelphia and Washington DC.

== Artist at work ==
Grell's regular clientele list included old movie palace giants Balaban and Katz and Rapp and Rapp architects, the Albert Pick Hotel chain, Daprato Statuary Company, Publix Theaters, Paramount and Universal Studios. Grell was primarily a portrait and mural painter, but the Grell Family collection and other known works include a vast array of mural studies, portraits, landscapes and still life paintings. Murals by Grell can be seen today by visiting the Chicago Theatre; the Hilton Netherland Plaza Hotel and Carew Tower in downtown Cincinnati; Assumption Catholic Church in Chicago; Palace Theater in Greensburg, PA; Manufactures Bank & Trust in St. Louis, MO now the Lift For Life Academy; Notre Dame de Chicago; the City of Detroit Water Board Building; Springfield, Illinois (Amtrak station); The Town of Persia, NY Town Hall in the old Bank of Gowanda; Citizens National Bank, Springville, New York; Peoples Church of Chicago; Pick-Ohio Hotel now Youngstown Metropolitan Housing Authority, Youngstown, OH and many others.

Noted large-scale mural commissions earned by Grell include Paramount Pictures Corporate Headquarters Times Square Paramount Theatre New York City, Citizens National Bank New York City, Eldorado Hotel New York City, Toledo Paramount Theatre, Ft. Wayne IN Paramount Theatre, Denver Paramount Theatre, Gateway Theatre Chicago IL, Congress Plaza Hotel Chicago IL three separate series of commissions in 1940 1952 & 1955, Hotel Lafontaine Huntington IN eight panels, Bank of Detroit History of Banking panels, Bank of New York lobby murals, Sacred Heart Chicago, Rotary Club (#1) of Chicago Board room wall panel, St. Mary's Academy Chicago IL, Aragon Ballroom Grand stairway Spanish dance mural Chicago IL, Northwestern Military and Naval Academy, Geneva Lake, WI, Mark Twain, Fountain Square and Jefferson Hotels in St. Louis, MO and Union Station WW II ticket counter mural St. Louis, MO.

== Tree Studios artist colony ==
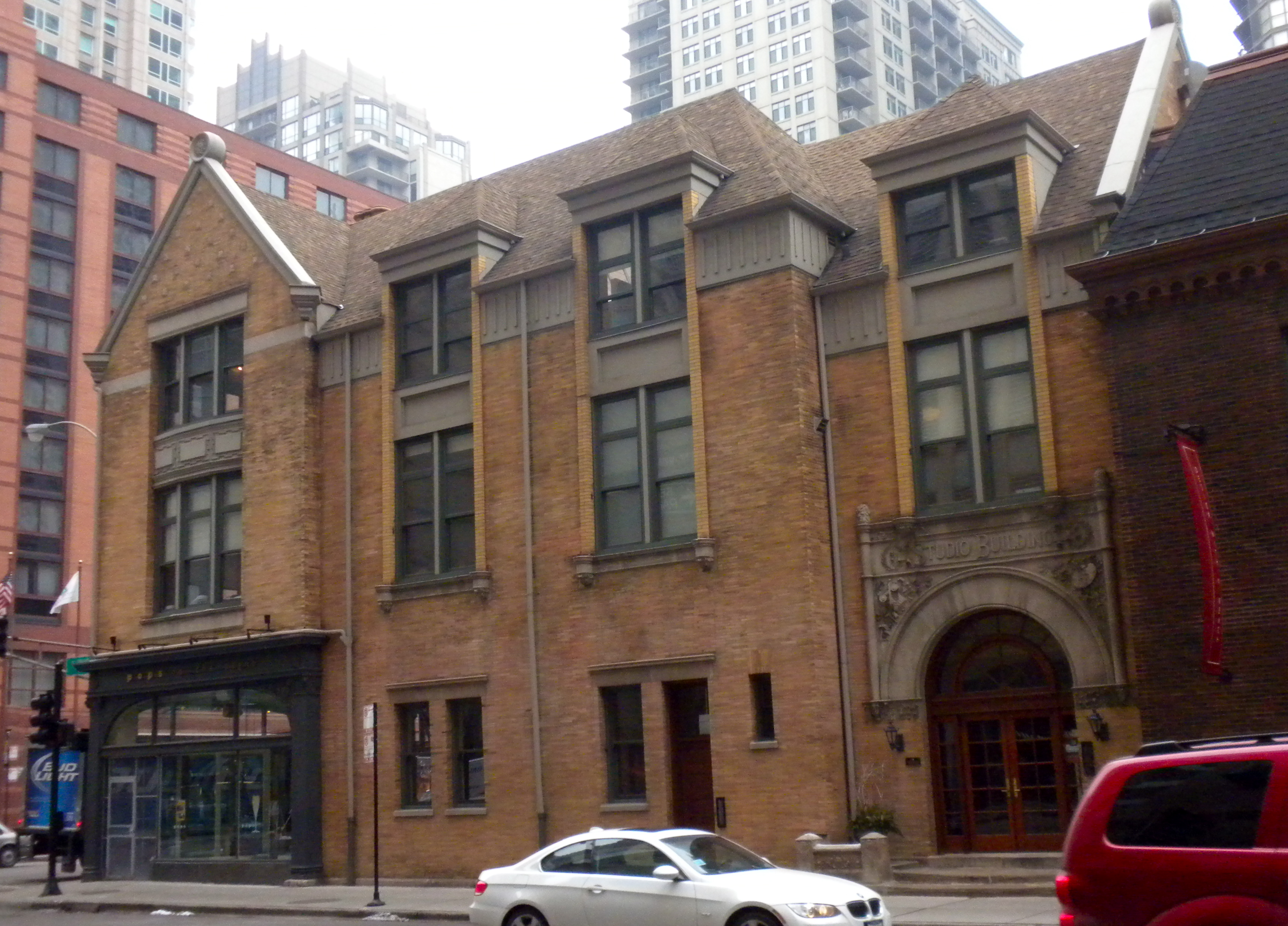
Tree Studio art colony former building

Close friends included Tarzan illustrator J. Allen St. John; Taos Society of Artists early members E. Martin Hennings (Best man in Grell's April 1, 1922 wedding at Tree Studios), Walter Ufer and Victor Higgins; sculptors John Storrs and Albin Polasek; painters Carl Hoeckner, John and Anna Stacey, Julius Moessel, Macena Barton, impressionist Pauline Palmer, Diana Barrymore and husband, Olympian and Tarzan actor Johnny Weissmuller; vaudeville actors Jean and Inez Bregant of Council Bluffs, Iowa and many others.

Grell and other resident artists frequently entertained Hollywood and New York celebrities and aspiring young artists such as Emerson Woelffer in their art studios in North Chicago.

In 1960, at the age of 72 and ailing from heart disease, Grell and fellow Tree Studio artist and resident Donald J. Anderson chained themselves to a "tree" to help prevent bulldozers from tearing down the historic Tree Studios building and annexes, now a National Historic Landmark and Chicago City Landmark built in 1894 – the oldest resident artist colony in America.

== Death ==
Grell died of a heart ailment while working on numerous mural projects and easel paintings at Tree Studios in Chicago on November 21, 1960.

== Selected works ==
Grell's large mural titled Destiny won the 1930 Harry A. Frank Prize at the Art Institute of Chicago and his Portrait of the Painter, Moessel won the Municipal Art League prize at the Art Institute of Chicago, in 1936. Grell's more significant works include; four large portraits of the first four US Presidents commissioned by the Mayflower Hotel in Washington DC in the 1920s, the Times Square Paramount Theatre, Gateway Theater Chicago, Toledo Paramount Theatre, 14 large French Fairytale murals painted in 1920 for the new Balaban & Katz Theater giant to adorn the proscenium arch inside the Chicago Theater and again 14 large Greek and Roman themed murals painted in 1932 for the "Century of Progress" renovation inside the Chicago Theater, 18 large murals throughout the Netherland Plaza Hotel (now a Hilton), Cincinnati, OH in 1930 (Who's Who in America artists file), Carnival Evening 1917 (Art Institute of Chicago Instructor's Resume of 1918) and The Midnight Carol 1924 oil on canvas works exhibited at the Art Institute of Chicago, Lady, with Dog 1935 oil on canvas exhibited at the Art Institute of Chicago & Chicago Galleries Association (compared to Thomas Gainsborough), Orpheus, Evening on the Lake, and Bacchus from 1905 exhibited in Dresden, Germany in 1906 and won honors.

== Images ==
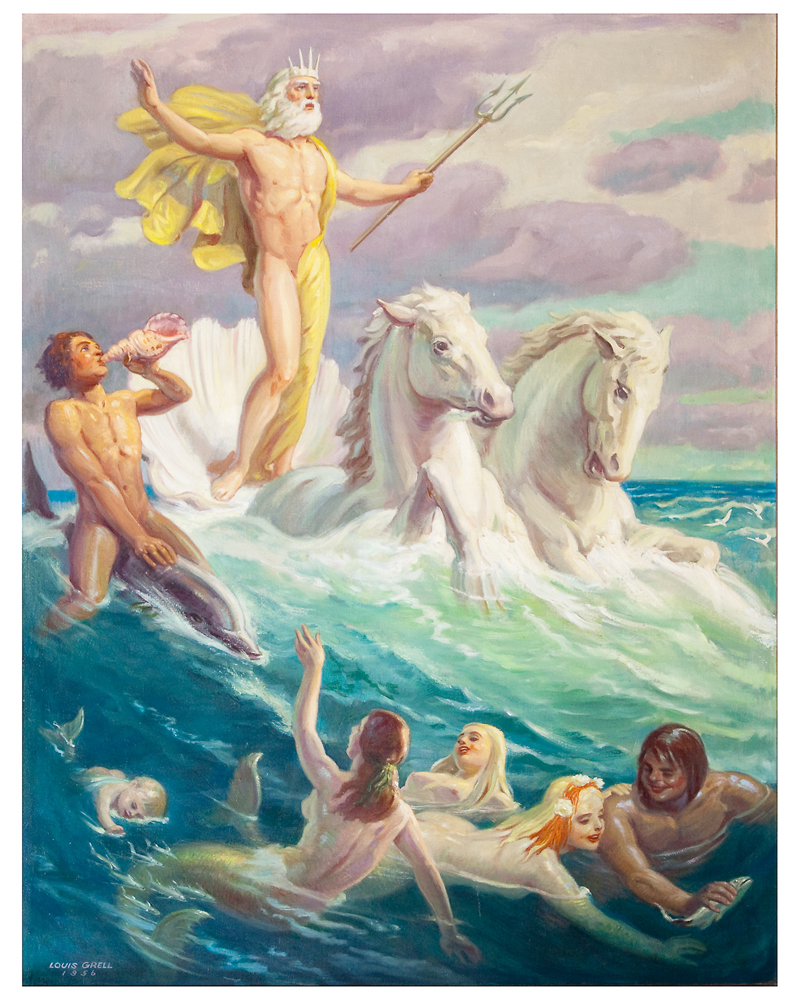
Neptune on Horses, 1956, oil

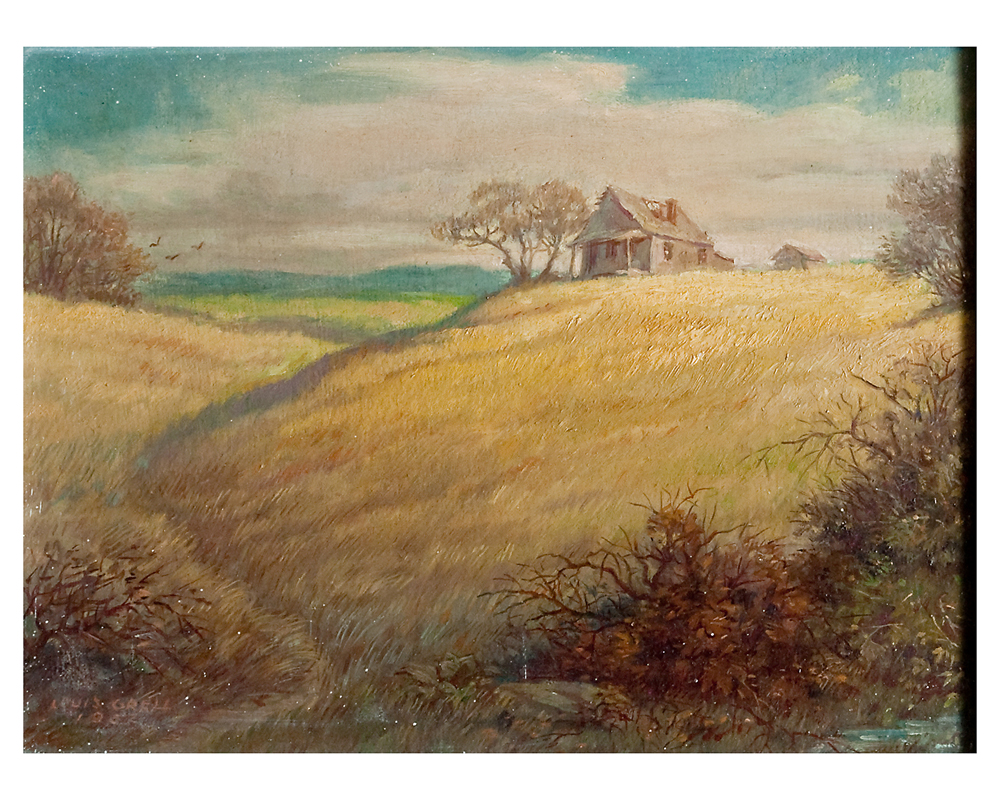
Cabin on Meadow, 1952, oil

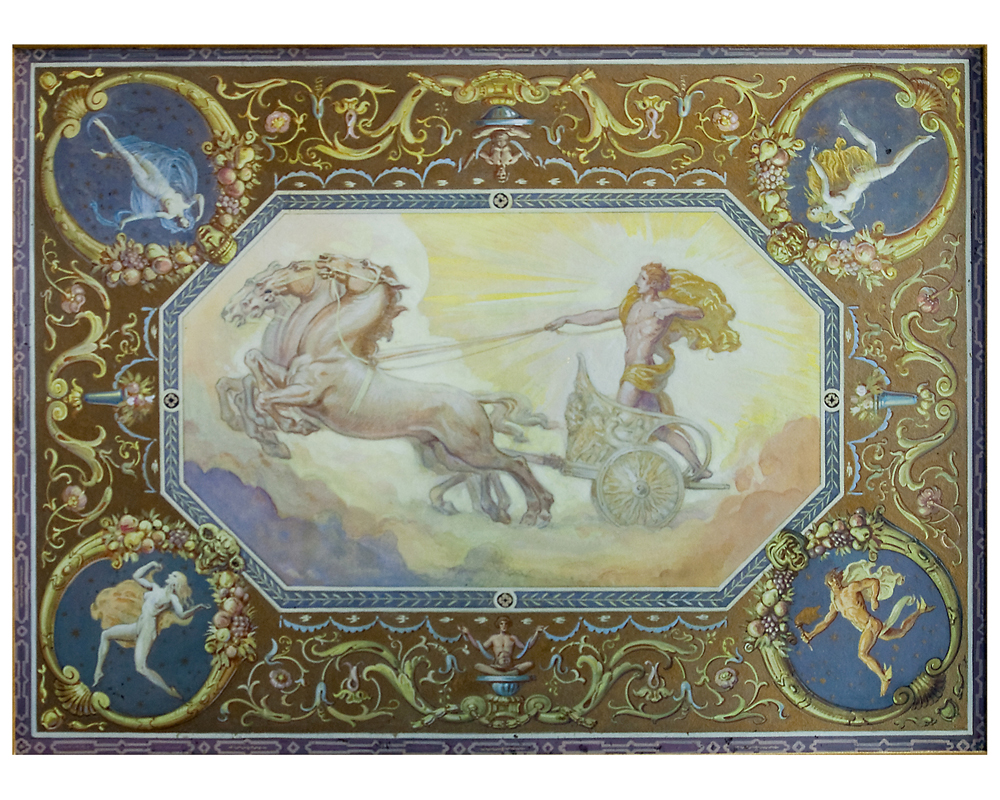
Apollo on Chariot, mural study, ca. 1930, watercolor

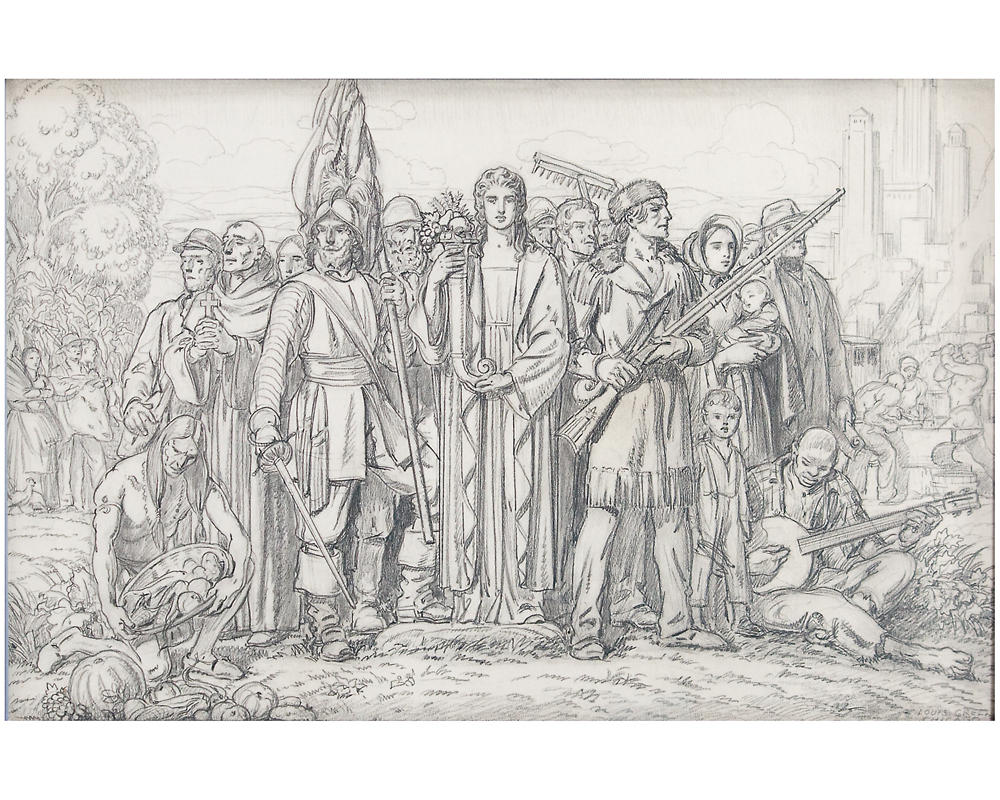
Century of Progress, 1932, sketch

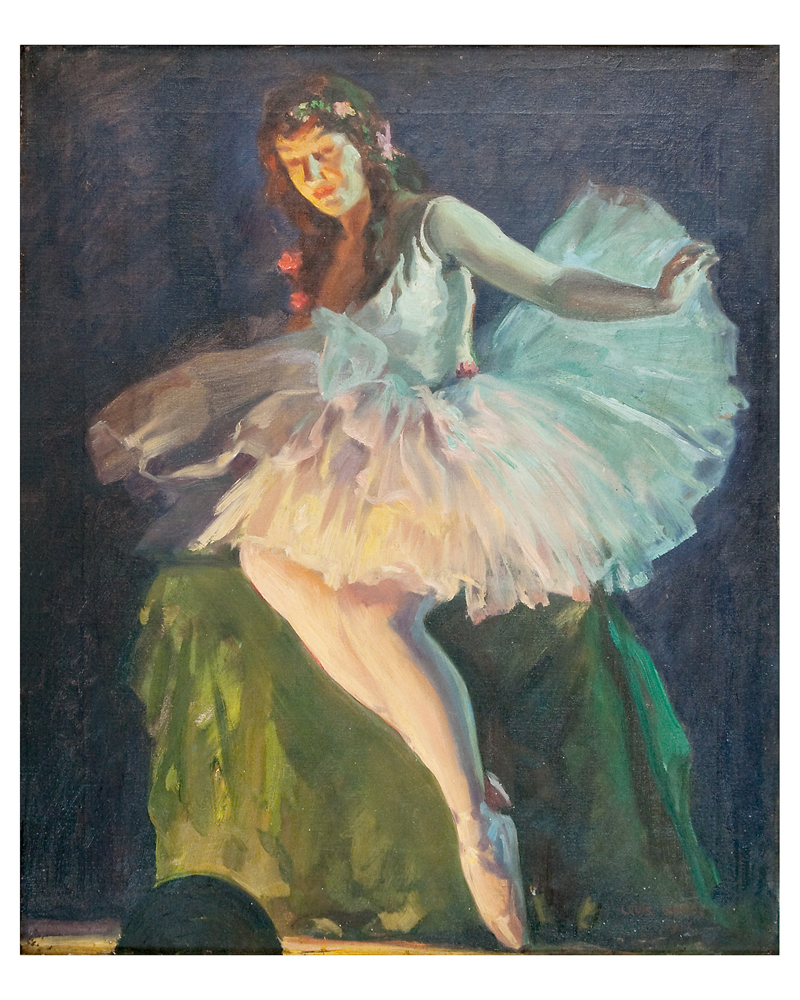
Ballerina, 1917, oil
