= Bank of Gowanda =

Historic commercial building in New York, United States

- U.S. National Register of Historic Places
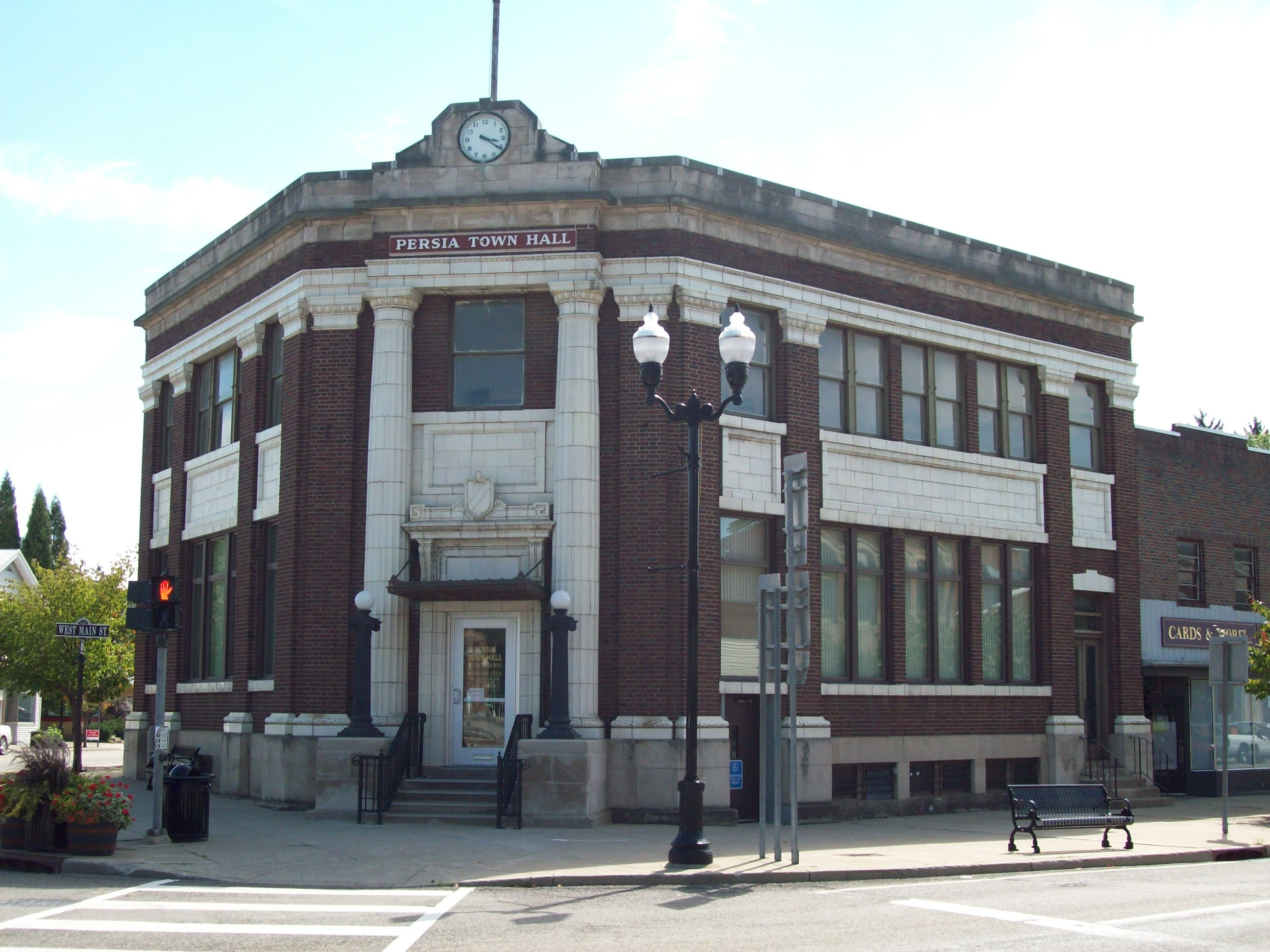
- Bank of Gowanda, August 2010

- Location within New York Location within the United States
- Location: 8 W. Main St., Gowanda, New York
- Coordinates: 42°27′45″N 78°56′10″W
- Area: less than one acre
- Built: 1914
- Architect: Moeller, Edvard H.
- Architectural style: Classical Revival, Moderne
- NRHP reference No.: 01000553
- Added to NRHP: May 25, 2001

Bank of Gowanda is a historic bank building located at Gowanda in Cattaraugus County, New York. It was built in 1914, to the designs of Edvard Moeller. It is a two-story, five-sided Neoclassical style building constructed of load bearing concrete masonry and clad in red brick. The interior features a mural by noted artist Louis Grell. Since 1966, the structure has served as town hall for the town of Persia, New York.

It was listed on the National Register of Historic Places in 2001.
