= E. Martin Hennings House and Studio Historic District =

Historic house in New Mexico, United States

- U.S. National Register of Historic Places
- U.S. Historic district
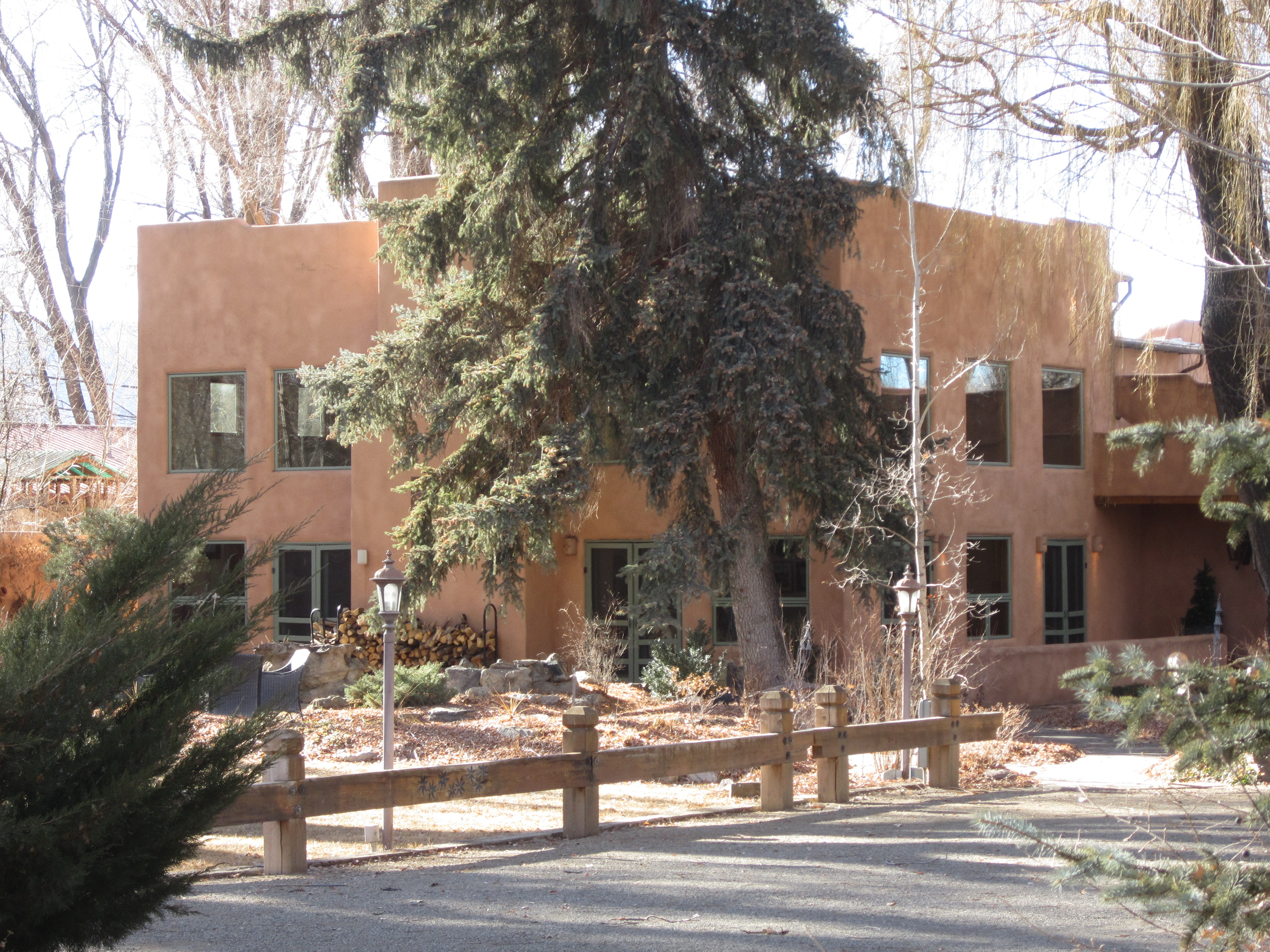

- Location within New Mexico Location within the United States
- Location: SE corner of Dolan St. and Kit Carson Rd., Taos, New Mexico
- Coordinates: 36°24′1″N 105°34′3″W
- Area: 1 acre (0.40 ha)
- Architectural style: Vernacular southwest
- NRHP reference No.: 90001028
- Added to NRHP: July 5, 1990

The E. Martin Hennings House and Studio Historic District was the property of Taos, New Mexico artist E. Martin Hennings. The property includes two contributing buildings and a contributing structure. It was listed on the National Register of Historic Places in 1990.

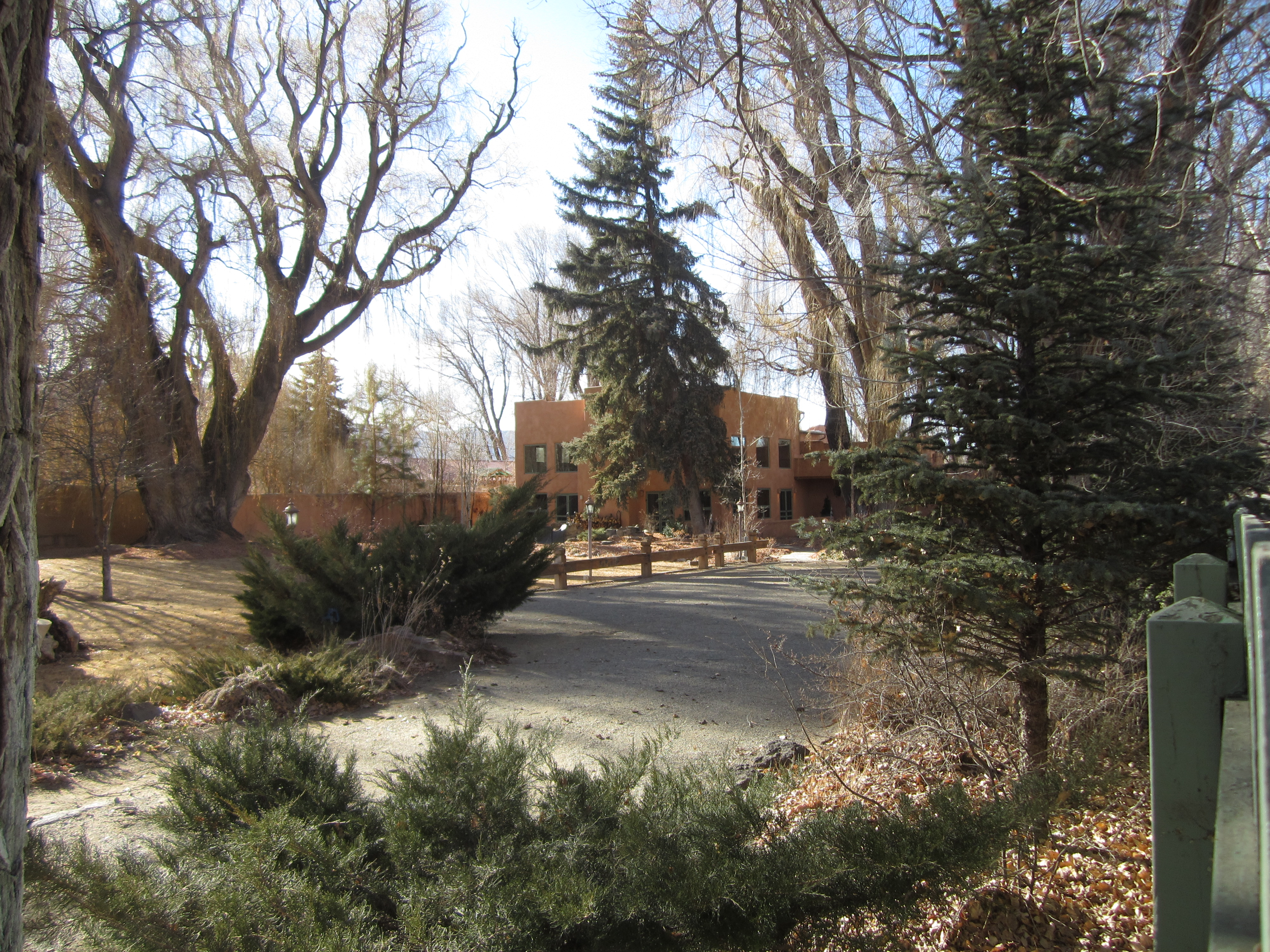

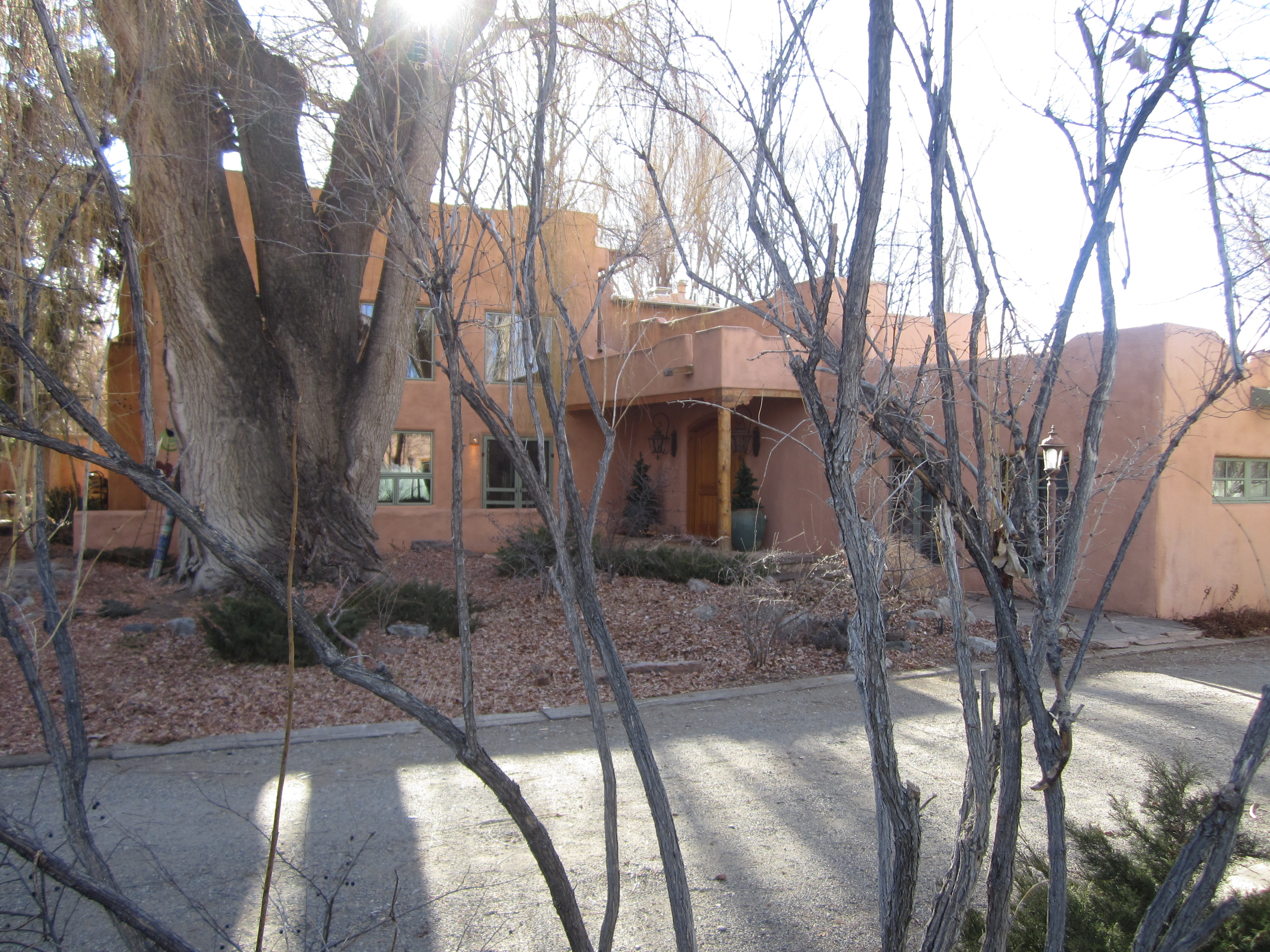
