= Julius Rolshoven =

American painter

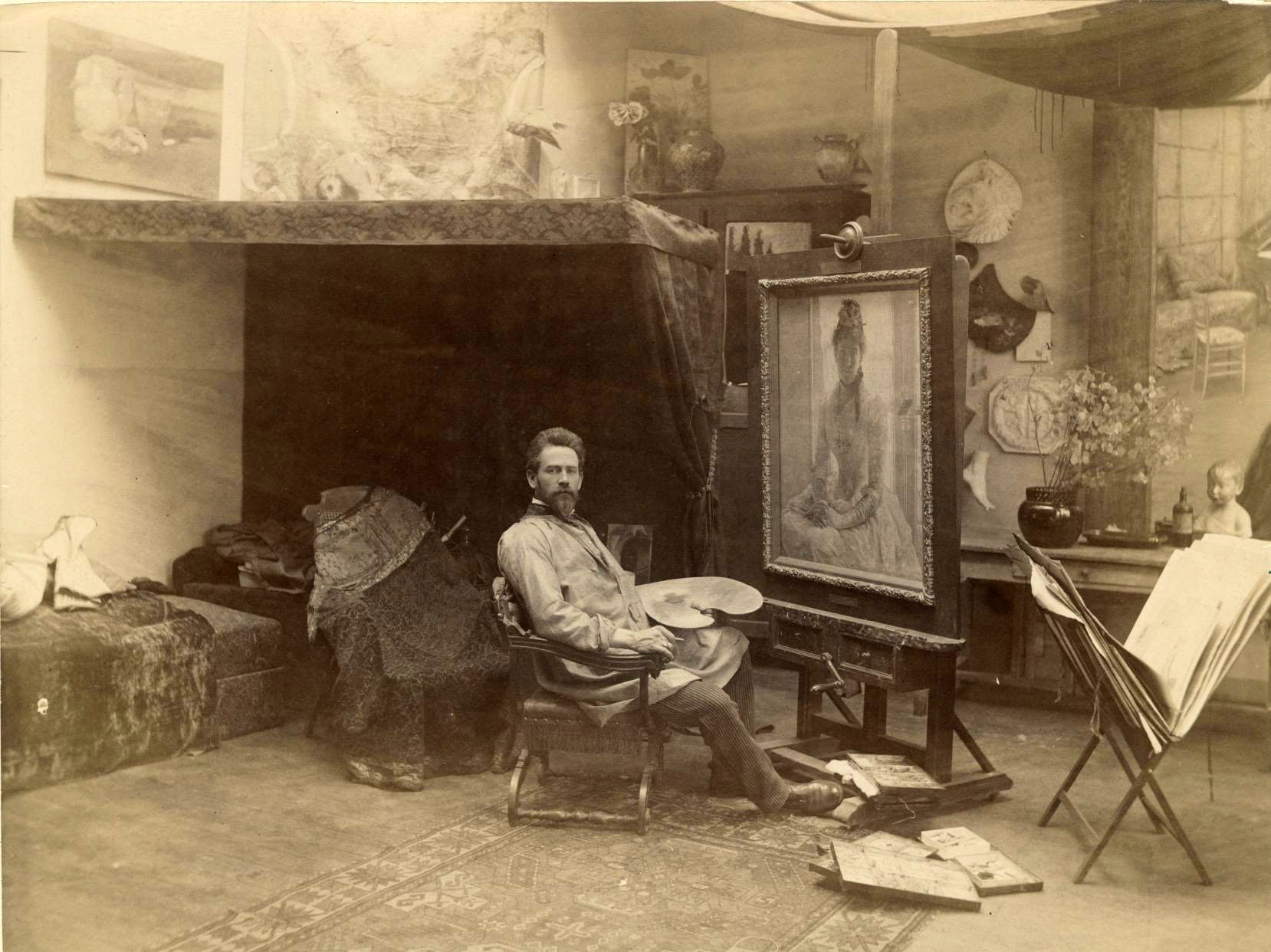
- Julius Rolshoven in his Paris studio
- Born: October 28, 1858; Detroit, Michigan, US
- Died: December 8, 1930 (aged 72)
- Education: Frank Duveneck
- Alma mater: Cooper Union; Kunstakademie Düsseldorf; Academie Julian
- Known for: Painting
- Elected: National academy of design Taos Society of Artists

Julius Rolshoven (October 28, 1858 – December 8, 1930) was an American painter.

== Biography ==
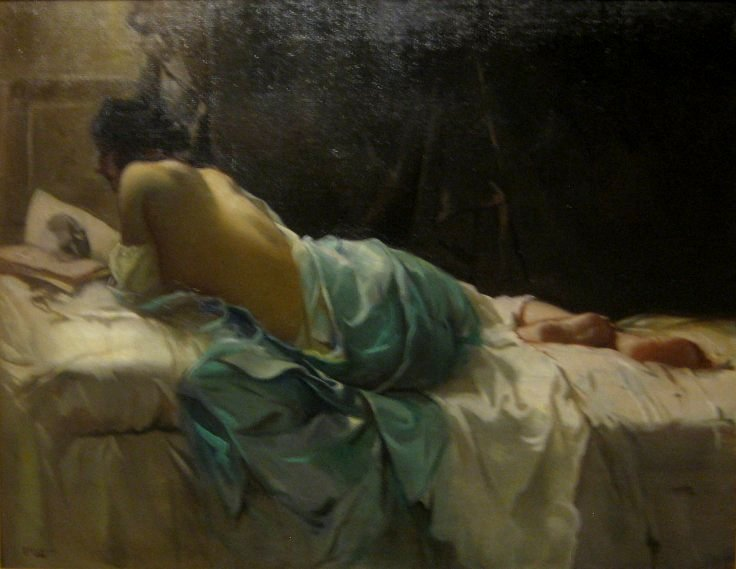
Nude - Model Reading a Sketch Book, oil on canvas painting by Julius Rolshoven, c. 1900, El Paso Museum of Art

Rolshoven was born on October 28, 1858 in Detroit, Michigan. At 18 he went to New York City to study at the Cooper Union Art School, then the Düsseldorf Academy, then continued on to Munich, studying under the Kentucky-born artist Frank Duveneck in his Venice and Florence schools, becoming one of the "Duveneck Boys". After some years in Paris and London, Rolshoven decided to settle in Florence in 1902. In 1905, while he was drawing outdoors, he discovered a building that had maintained the old charm of a castle, called "Devil's Castle" and belonged to the family Talani. The artist was so enthusiastic of the environment that in 1907 he bought the property in state of disrepair. Finally Rolshoven returned to the United States at the beginning of World War I. In December 1915 he married his second wife Harriette Haynes Blazo in Los Angeles.

By 1916 Rolshoven had settled in the American southwest, setting up a studio in Santa Fe's Governor's Palace. He was also an early member of the Taos Society of Artists. From 1920 until his death he moved back and forth among his three residences, Florence, Detroit and Santa Fe. He died December 8, 1930 on shipboard in the Atlantic. "He lived for 40 years in Florence, Italy, his adopted home, re-converting a 900-year-old home, "Castello del Diavolo" into an estate so splendid that an impressed Italian government designated it as a national monument".

In September 1957 Mrs. Rolshoven, the artist's widow, signed an agreement for a total donation in favor of the University of New Mexico of $100,000, of which $15,000 immediately and the remaining $85,000 to be paid later and from her assets; in addition, she donated twenty works made by her husband, which were prudently estimated at approximately between $50,000 and $75,000.
