= Marion Koogler McNay =

American painter

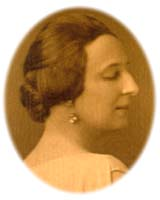
- Marion Koogler McNay, 1915
- Born: Jessie Marion Koogler; 7 February 1883; De Graff, Ohio, United States
- Died: 13 April 1950 (aged 67); San Antonio, Texas, United States
- Known for: Painter

Marion Koogler McNay (7 February 1883 – 13 April 1950), was an American painter, art collector, and art teacher who inherited a substantial oil fortune upon the death of her parents. She later willed her fortune to be used to establish San Antonio's first museum of modern art, which today bears her name. Inspired by Modern, Impressionistic, and American art, she used her wealthy background to cultivate her eclectic art collection. McNay was able to design her San Antonio home after moving there in 1926. As soon as McNay moved to San Antonio, she began buying and commissioning art pieces. The Spanish styled house was able to showcase a diverse amount of paintings, including both American and European styled art. McNay favored art made in the Southwestern American style. The fortune she inherited funded her art collection that included over seven hundred works by 1950, the year of her death. McNay's home, art collection, property, and an endowment were left to the city of San Antonio after her death. McNay's goal was to provide the people of San Antonio "a place of beauty with the comforts and warmth of a home."

== Early life ==
Marion was born in Ohio to Dr. Marion and Clara Koogler. McNay was their only child. A year after her birth the family moved to El Dorado, Kansas, where her parents invested and purchased a large tract of pasture land. This land later proved to contain substantial oil reserves, and made the family wealthy. This allowed Marion to attend the University of Kansas from 1900 to 1902 and the Art Institute of Chicago. When her parents retired in Marion, Ohio she moved back to her home state. The San Antonio mansion she had built in 1926 after McNay's inheritance was designed by Atlee and Robert Ayres on an acreage called Sunset Hills, and was finished in 1929.

== Marriages ==
Marion married her first husband, railway manager and sergeant Don McNay, in 1917. He died ten months later from the Spanish influenza in 1918. She first visited Texas when Don McNay was stationed in Laredo during World War I. In 1926, she moved to San Antonio, Texas, where she married prominent ophthalmologist Donald T. Atkinson, who owned a piece of land north of San Antonio, Texas known as Sunset Hills. Marion and Donald were both wealthy, and her oil inheritance was not affected during the Great Depression. After her marriage with Donald ended in 1936, she went on to marry (and divorce) four more times, afterwards changing her surname back to McNay for the remainder of her life. She briefly married and financially supported artist Victor Higgins in 1937, but the two separated two years later and divorced in 1940.

== Teaching ==
In 1915, the superintendent of the city schools of Marion, Ohio wrote that she was "one of the best qualified art teachers I have ever known. She teaches art in a manner that arouses and develops the child's observation and enlarges his aesthetic nature." McNay was an avid supporter of the academic pursuit of the arts throughout her life. In 1942, she offered the use of an unused aviary on her property to the San Antonio Art Institute, so that the school did not have to close. Her friend and collaborator, sculptor Charles Umlauf, said that she "always had the sympathy of the artist at hand because she herself was an artist". In the later years of McNay's life she served as the director of the San Antonio Art Institute, which eventually closed in 1990, forty years after her death.

== Art collecting ==
In 1926, after the death of her father, Marion moved to San Antonio with her mother and married Dr. Donald Atkinson. On his property, she began to construct a Spanish Mediterranean style mansion, designing some of the tilework and ceiling stencils herself. The mansion was completed in 1927. She also began to accumulate a significant collection of artwork. The first oil painting she purchased was Diego Rivera's Delfina Flores. She collected a large number of French Impressionist and Post-Impressionist works of art as well as works created by early 20th-century modernists including Picasso, Matisse, and Chagall. She also bought a number of Southwestern santos and retablos. Alongside these paintings and photographs, Native American pottery, sculptures, prints and designs were accumulated through her own purchases and later posthumous donations and acquisitions.

== Pueblo Indian patronage ==
Marion was a significant patron of the arts of the Pueblo Indians of New Mexico, who she visited frequently. Although raised Presbyterian, McNay converted to Catholicism, influenced by Reverend Peter Baque, the founder of The Missionary Servants of St. Anthony. McNay donated to the organization frequently. In 1943, Congress proposed a bill providing for the exploration of Pueblo lands with the ultimate goal of building a dam on the Rio Grande. Marion, together with other conservationists, was instrumental in defeating this proposal. After the death of Reverend Baque in San Antonio in 1938, McNay requested that she be buried next to him.

== Death and legacy ==
Upon her death, Marion left her art collection of more than 700 works of art, her mansion, the surrounding 23 acres of land, and an endowment to establish the first modern art museum in Texas. This was the first museum of its kind in San Antonio and the southwest region of the United States. The museum was named to recognize and honor Marion and has been considered the centerpiece of San Antonio art community and culture. The museum has expanded to include galleries of medieval and Renaissance artwork and a larger collection of 20th-century European and American modernist work. A large theatre arts library and gallery were also added, as well as an art reference library and an auditorium. In 2008, the Stieren Center was added to the original building by internationally renowned architect Jean-Paul Viguier to create additional gallery space for large-scale and traveling exhibitions.
