= Bert Geer Phillips =

American painter

- Born: July 15, 1868; Hudson, New York
- Died: June 16, 1956; San Diego, California
- Education: Art Students League of New York; National Academy of Design; Académie Julian
- Known for: Painting
- Movement: Taos Society of Artists

Bert Geer Phillips (July 15, 1868 – June 16, 1956) was an American artist and a founding member of the Taos Society of Artists. He settled in what was then Taos, New Mexico Territory (1898) and was a founder of the Taos art colony. He is known for his paintings of Native Americans, New Mexico, and the American Southwest. He was also a benefactor of the Western artist Harold Dow Bugbee, who became curator of the Panhandle-Plains Historical Museum in Canyon, Texas in 1951.

== Early life and education ==
Phillips was born in Hudson, New York in 1868. During his childhood he was influenced by tales of the exploits of American frontiersman Kit Carson and other tales of Western adventure involving American Indians, such as those in James Fenimore Cooper's Leatherstocking Tales. In his recollections of childhood, he noted that he could always be found with paintbrush in hand. He was one of the first to enroll when George McKinstry opened an art studio in Hudson.

Phillips left home at age sixteen, moving to New York City where he attended the Art Students League of New York and the National Academy of Design. In 1894 he traveled to Europe, briefly staying in London before moving to Paris, where he studied at the Académie Julian. While at the Académie he became friends with Ernest Blumenschein and Joseph Henry Sharp.

== Artistic career ==
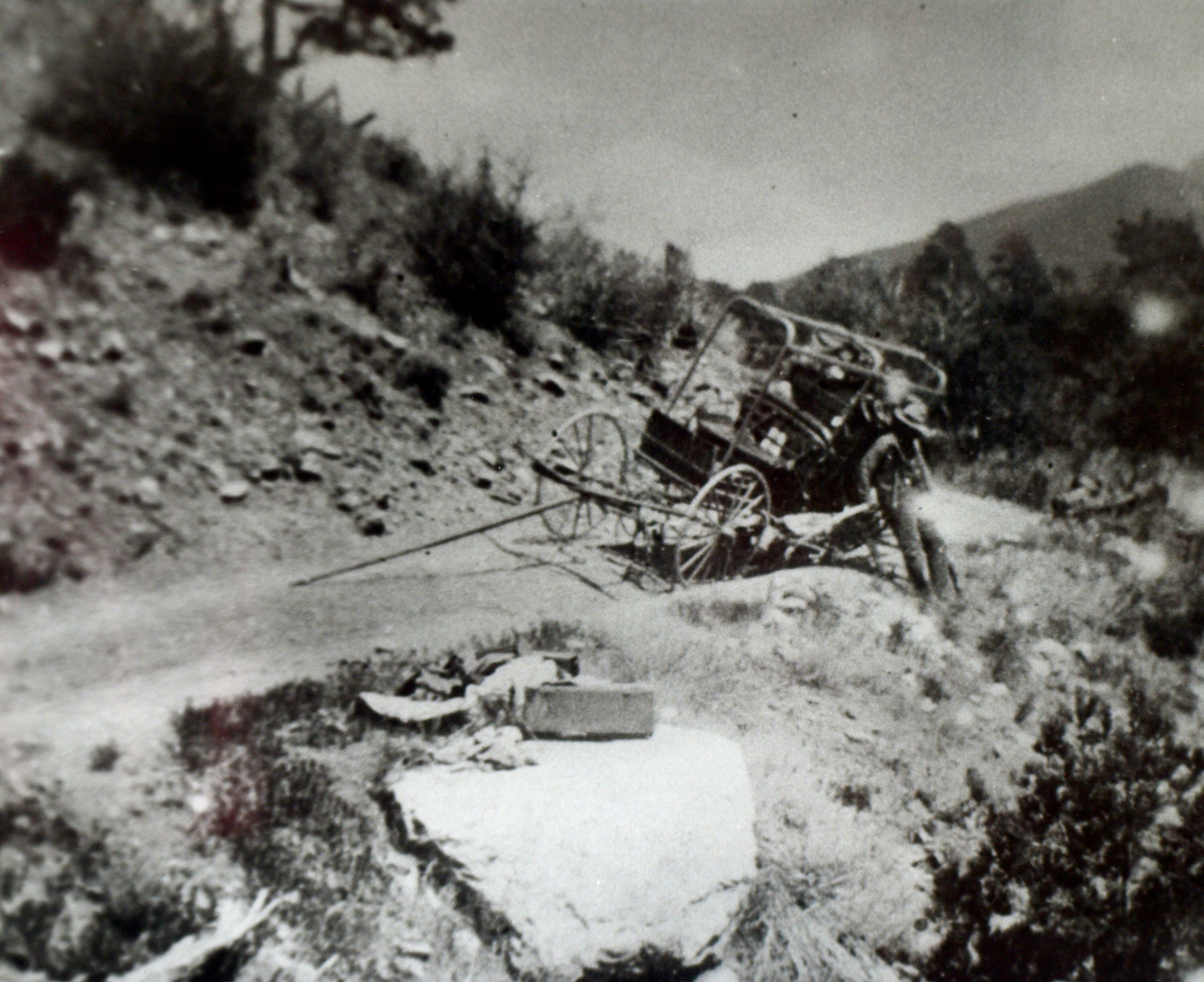
The accident that started the Taos art colony, 1898.

Phillips returned to New York in 1896, where together with Ernest Blumenschein he leased a studio. In the Spring of 1898, Phillips accompanied Blumenschein on a journey to the American West. Their first stop was Denver, Colorado, where they bought art and camping supplies, a wagon, horses, and a revolver. Thus equipped, they set out with the intention of reaching Mexico.

In northern New Mexico, one of their wagon wheels broke due to the roughness of the terrain. Blumenschein rode out on horseback to nearby Taos, New Mexico to have the wheel repaired, while Phillips waited with the wagon. After Blumenschein returned with the repaired wheel three days later, they continued on to Taos, where they sold their horse and equipage, set up a studio, and began to paint.

Phillips decided to stay in Taos when Blumenschein returned to New York a few months later. He and a friend caused a skirmish during a religious ceremony on Taos Plaza when they refused to remove their hats; during the skirmish the sheriff was killed. The incident increased tensions between the town's Hispanic and Anglo residents. Phillips wrote in a letter to Blumenschein, "I began to feel as if this was the real 'border life', and only wish old Kit Carson was here with us."

Phillips married Rose Martin, the sister of the famous local doctor Thomas "Doc" Martin, in 1899. He conceived the idea of starting an art colony in Taos, which he discussed in correspondence with Blumenschein. In 1915, his dream became reality with the formation of the Taos Society of Artists, of which Phillips was a founding member together with his friends Ernest Blumenschein, Joseph Henry Sharp, and three other artists. The Society was founded in the dining room of Phillips' in-laws, Doc and Helen Martin, who was herself a batik artist. In addition to being instrumental in the formation of the Society, Phillips also spent more years in Taos than any other member.

== Conservationism ==
Phillips was instrumental in the 1906 establishment of the Taos National Forest. He later became its first forest ranger when he needed to rest his eyesight.

== See also ==
- Oscar E. Berninghaus
- E. Irving Couse
- W. Herbert Dunton
