= Kenneth Miller Adams =

American artist (1897–1966)

- Born: August 6, 1897; Topeka, Kansas, US
- Died: June 28, 1966; Albuquerque, New Mexico, US
- Education: Art Institute of Chicago; Art Student's League
- Occupation: Artist
- Known for: Lithography, painting
- Style: Representational realism
- Movement: Taos Society of Artists
- Elected: Academician, National Academy of Design

Kenneth Miller Adams (August 6, 1897 – June 28, 1966) was an American artist.

== Life ==
Adams studied at the Art Institute of Chicago and the Art Students League. He served in the U.S. Army in World War I. In 1924, he moved to Taos, New Mexico. He was a member of the Taos Society of Artists. In 1933, he worked for the Treasury Relief Art Project and the Public Works of Art Project, federal arts programs of the United States Department of the Treasury. In 1937 he was commissioned by the Section of Painting and Sculpture to create murals for the U.S. post offices in Goodland, Kansas, and Deming, New Mexico.

In 1938, he moved to Albuquerque when he was awarded a Carnegie Corporation grant as the first artist-in-residence at the University of New Mexico. He later taught at the University of New Mexico until he retired in 1963. In 1961, he was elected to the National Academy of Design. He was commissioned by James F. Zimmerman, president of the university, to create a mural for the university library called The Three Peoples, to include the Hispanic, Native American and non-indigenous citizens. Some have considered the final panel of the four as racist because of placement of the Hispanic and Native American figures outside of the central figure in the final mural, but they are all included. The central figure has been vandalized twice, and then restored.

His work is in the Smithsonian American Art Museum, New Mexico Museum of Art, Colorado Springs Fine Art Center, Anschutz collection, the Fred Jones Museum of Art, University of Oklahoma. His papers are held at the Archives of American Art.
