= Walter Ufer =

American painter

Walter Ufer N.A
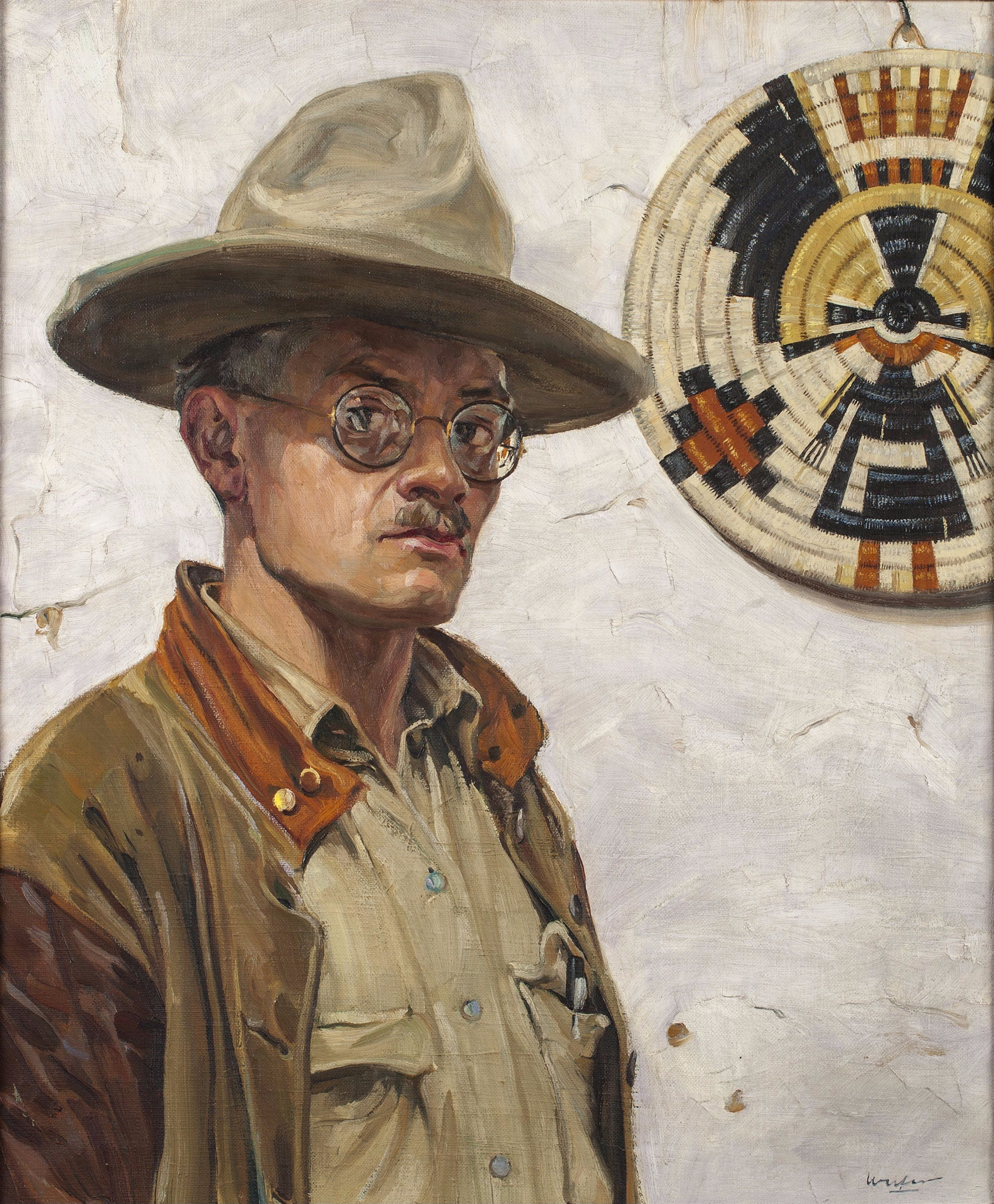
- Self-portrait, 1920
- Born: July 22, 1876; Huckeswagen, Germany
- Died: August 2, 1936 (aged 60); Santa Fe, New Mexico, US
- Education: Johan Jergens
- Alma mater: Art Institute of Chicago
- Known for: Painting, lithography
- Movement: Taos Society of Artists
- Spouse: Mary Monrad Frederiksen

Walter Ufer (July 22, 1876 – August 2, 1936) was an American artist based in Taos, New Mexico. His most notable work focuses on scenes of Native American life, particularly of the Pueblo Indians.

== Life and career ==
Ufer was born in Germany and moved with his family to Louisville, Kentucky in 1880, where Ufer grew up. After an apprenticeship as a lithographer, he went to Europe where he was a traveling journeyman. Like many of his fellow artists with ties to Indianapolis's German-American community, he went to Germany to study; he trained in Hamburg and Dresden. When he returned to America, he worked as a printer in Chicago and taught school, and later took classes in fine arts. After a brief time in Chicago, he returned to Munich in 1911 for further study as an artist. Upon his return to the US, he traveled to Taos in 1914. There he became one of the "Taos Ten", and associated with the Taos Society of Artists. In 1917 Ufer served as president of Chicago's Palette and Chisel, Academy of Fine Arts.

In addition to his art, Ufer is known for his social activism. He helped victims of the 1918 flu epidemic being treated in the local schoolhouse and collected money for miners on strike in Madrid, New Mexico. He was also a member of the Industrial Workers of the World and follower of Leon Trotsky.

Ufer died from appendicitis. At his request, he was cremated and his ashes were spread in an arroyo (creek) near Mabel Dodge Luhan's house in Taos.

== Artwork ==
In the 1920s, Ufer's work garnered critical and commercial success. He showed at the Carnegie International, and became an Academician of the National Academy of Design. Ufer's New Mexico paintings are characterized by genre scenes of Native American life and landscapes executed in a high-keyed palette. One of his favorite models was a Taos Indian named Jim Mirabal who was often referred to as "Ufer's Jim."

Museums with his work include the Art Institute of Chicago, the Museum of Fine Arts, Houston, New Mexico Museum of Art, Taos Art Museum (at Fechin House) and the Indianapolis Museum of Art.

== Gallery ==
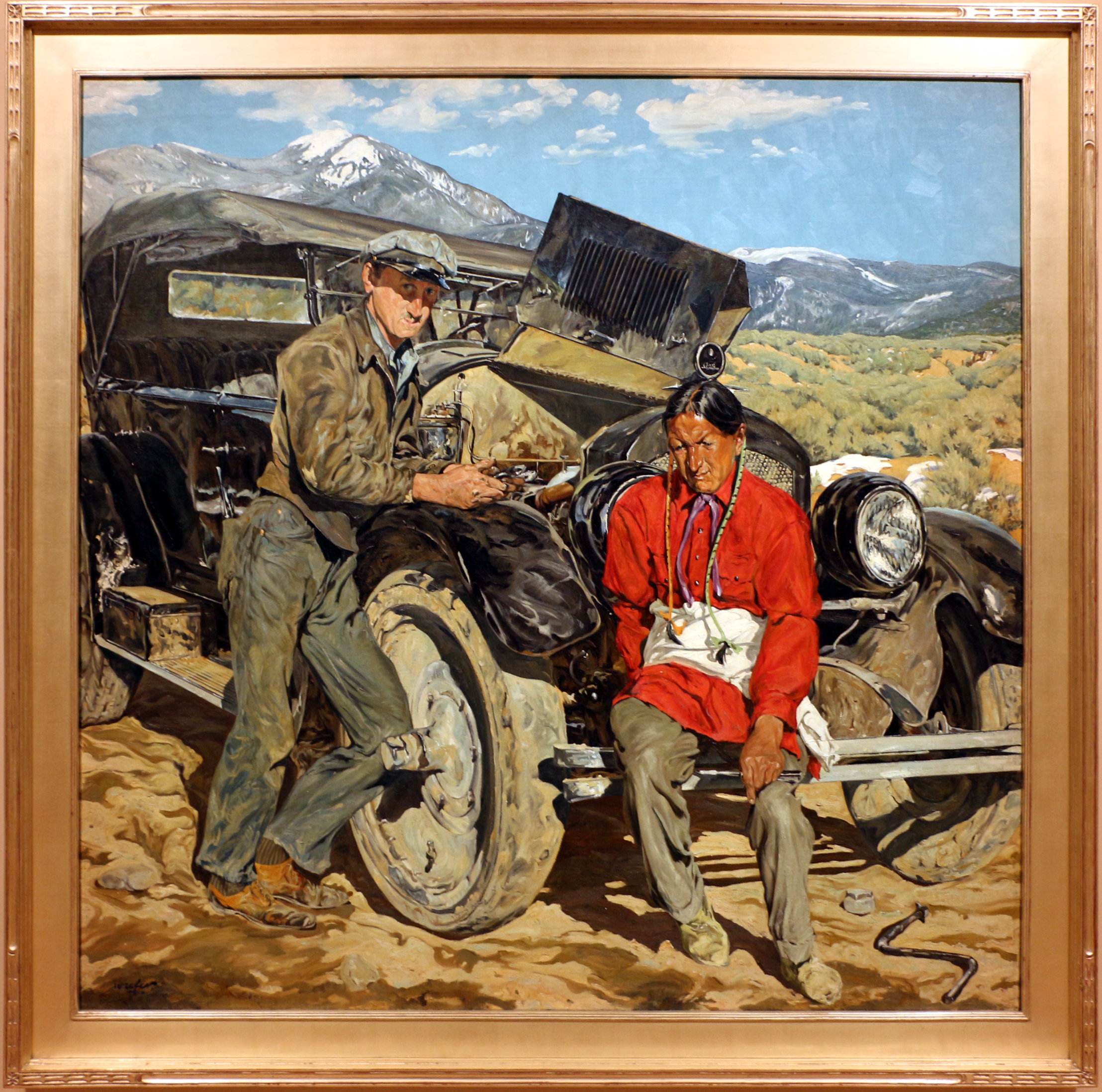
Bob Abbott and His Assistant, 1935, oil on canvas

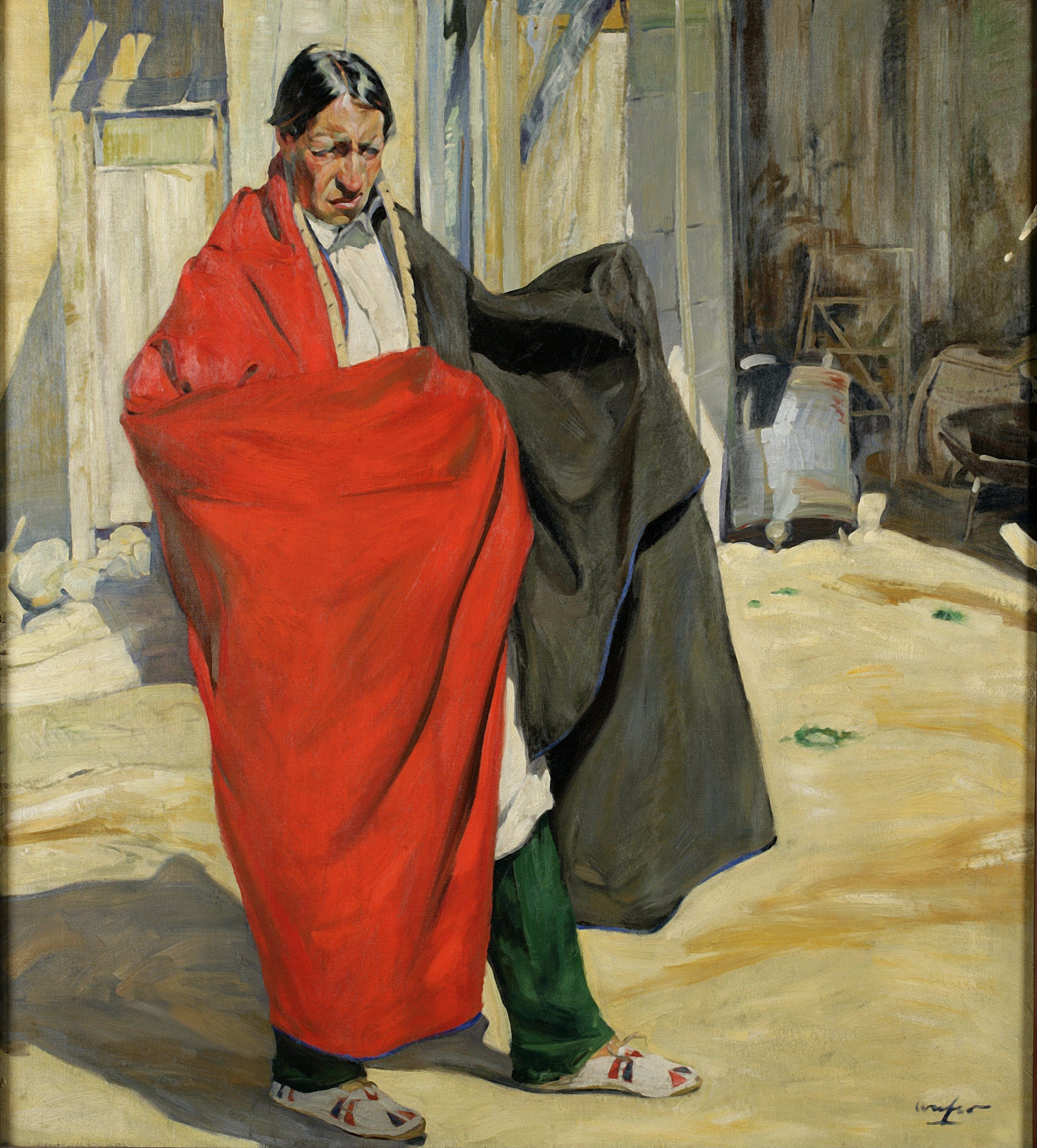
Jim, 1918, oil on canvas

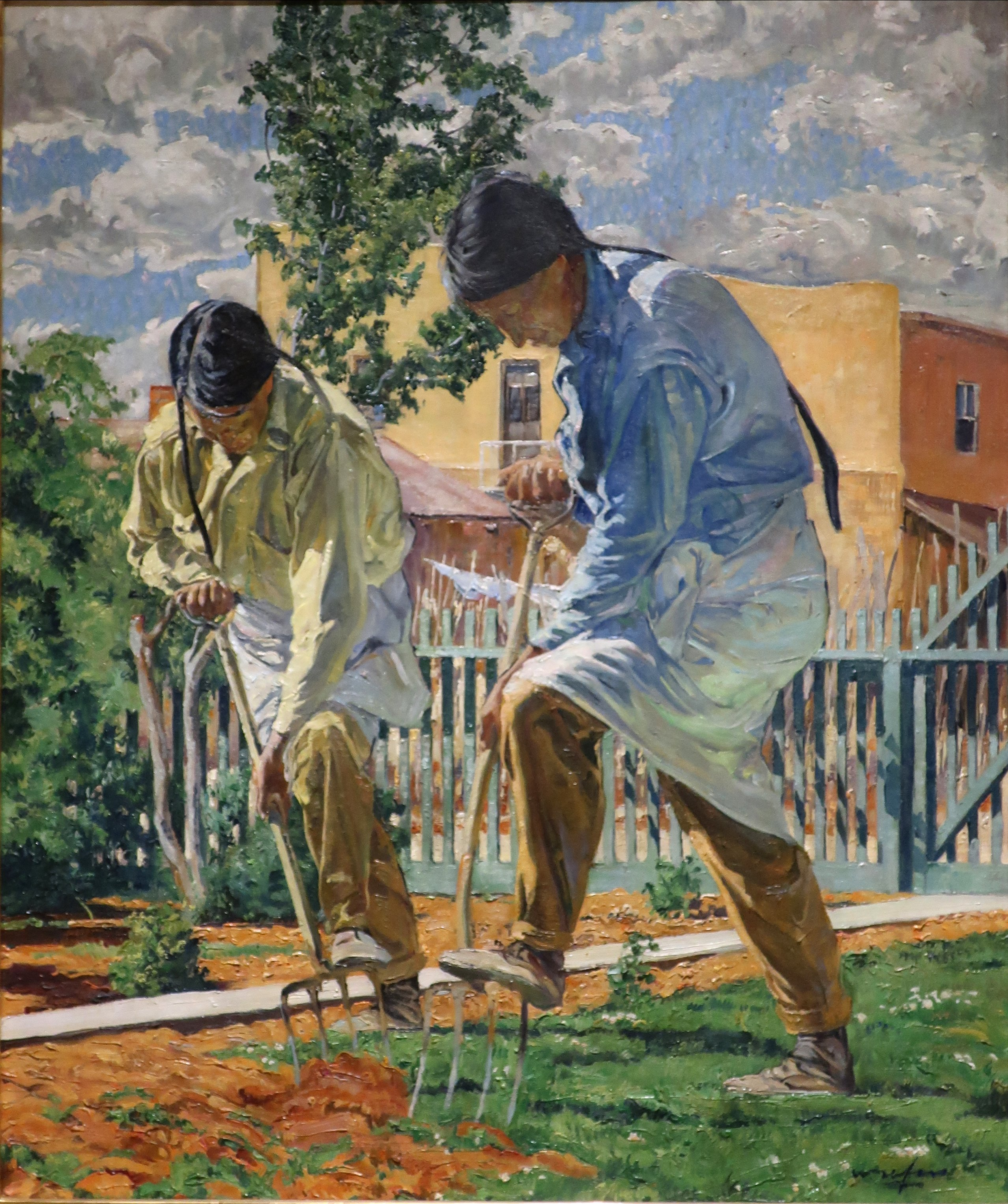
The Garden Makers, 1923, oil on canvas

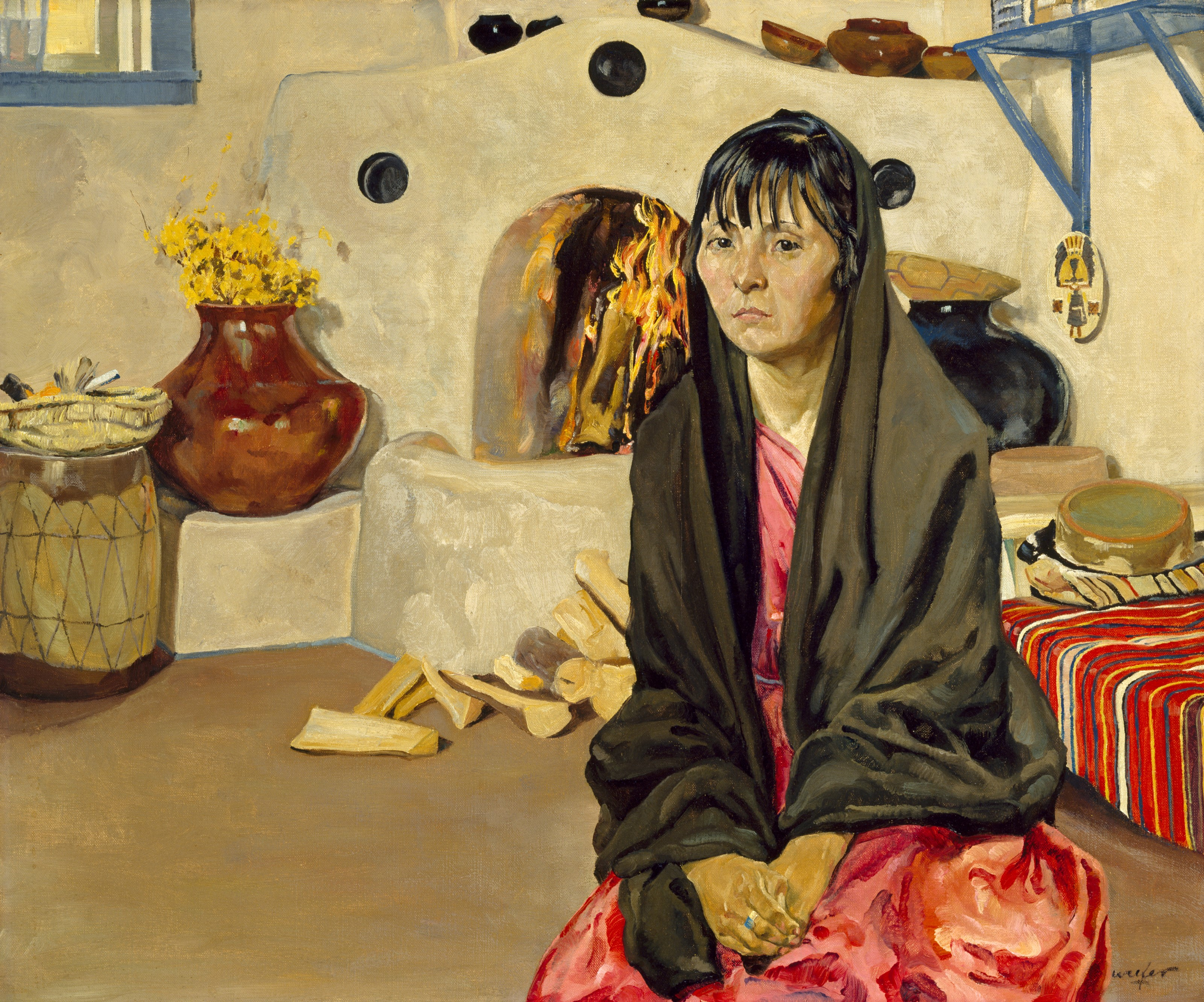
Anna, 1920s, oil on canvas

== See also ==
- Ernest L. Blumenschein
- E. Irving Couse
- W. Herbert Dunton
- E. Martin Hennings
- Oscar Berninghaus
