= Taos Society of Artists =

American artist group

The Taos Society of Artists was an organization of visual arts founded in Taos, New Mexico. Established in 1915, it was disbanded in 1927. The Society was essentially a commercial cooperative, as opposed to a stylistic collective, and its foundation contributed to the development of the tiny Taos art colony into an international art center.

== Beginning ==
Taos Society of Artists

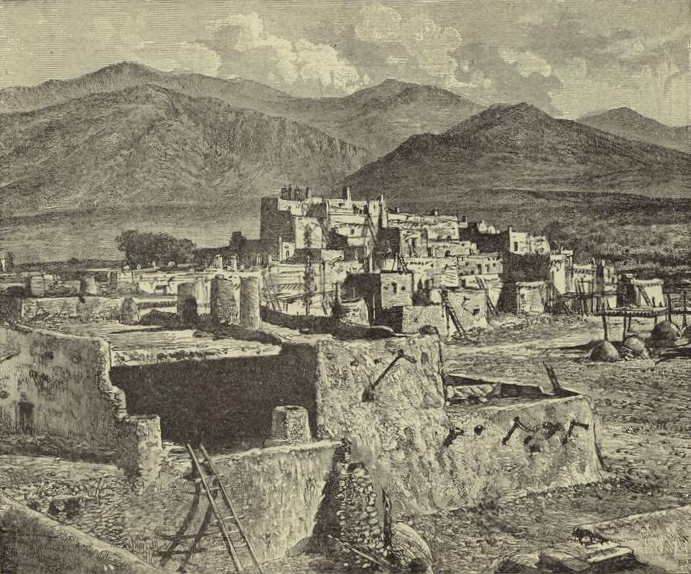
Taos Pueblo, Joseph Henry Sharp, 1893 illustration for Harper's Weekly

Joseph Henry Sharp, who made paintings of Native Americans throughout his life, visited Taos on a trip through New Mexico in 1893. While there he became interested in the people of the Taos Pueblo and the landscape, an interest he shared with Ernest Blumenschein when they were studying art in Paris. Having heard of the degree to which Sharp was interested in painting the western United States, and the Indian pueblo of Taos in particular, Blumenschein came to Taos with fellow artist Bert Phillips in 1898. Planning only to visit Taos, they became so enamored by the Taos Valley and its people that they decided to stay. This was the beginning of the Taos art colony.

Blumenschein described his first sights of Taos, "The month was September, and the fertile valley a beautiful sight, and inspiration for those who ply the brush for happiness. The primitive people of this out-of-the-way region were harvesting their crops by sunlight and by moonlight. Brown people they were, both Mexicans and Indians, happy people with happy children, in a garden spot protected by mountains." Native Americans had lived for centuries in the pueblo just outside the village of Taos. There a peace-loving, democratic society has maintained, and continues to maintain, its history, culture, dress and way of life over centuries.

Ernest Blumenschein returned to New York City for a time while Phillips stayed behind. Blumenschein kept up correspondence with Phillips and discussed setting up an artist colony in Taos. Blumenschein also wrote other artists in New York and Paris of Taos about the "beauty and artistic promise of northern New Mexico."

On July 19, 1915 Joseph Henry Sharp, E. Irving Couse, Oscar E. Berninghaus, W. Herbert Dunton, Ernest Blumenschein, and Bert Phillips formed the Taos Society of Artists. The six founding members were known as the "Taos Six". E. Irving Couse was the Society's first president.

Their work defined the first several decades of the Taos art colony, and was distinguished by depictions of Native Americans in traditional clothing, area Hispanics and Anglo-Americans and landscapes.

The group's first exhibition was held at the Palace of the Governors in Santa Fe soon after their formation. By 1917 they were sending travelling exhibits of their work across the United States. Initial critical reaction of the works was that they were unrealistic and overdone: vivid colors, too emotionally evocative and strong vibrational quality. The artists questioned the critics veracity, since they had never been to the southwestern desert, nor the Taos Pueblo.

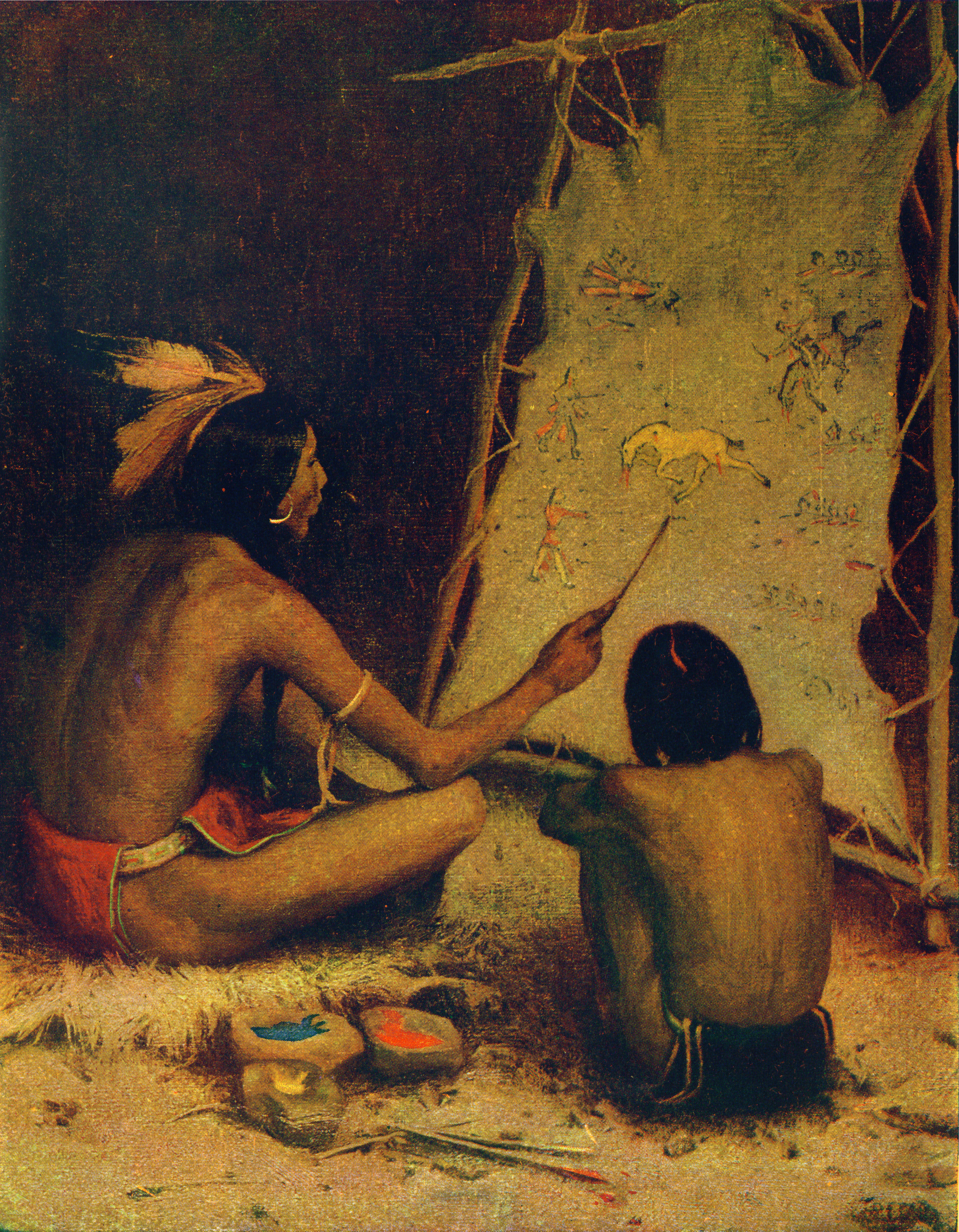
E. Irving Couse, The Historian, 1902

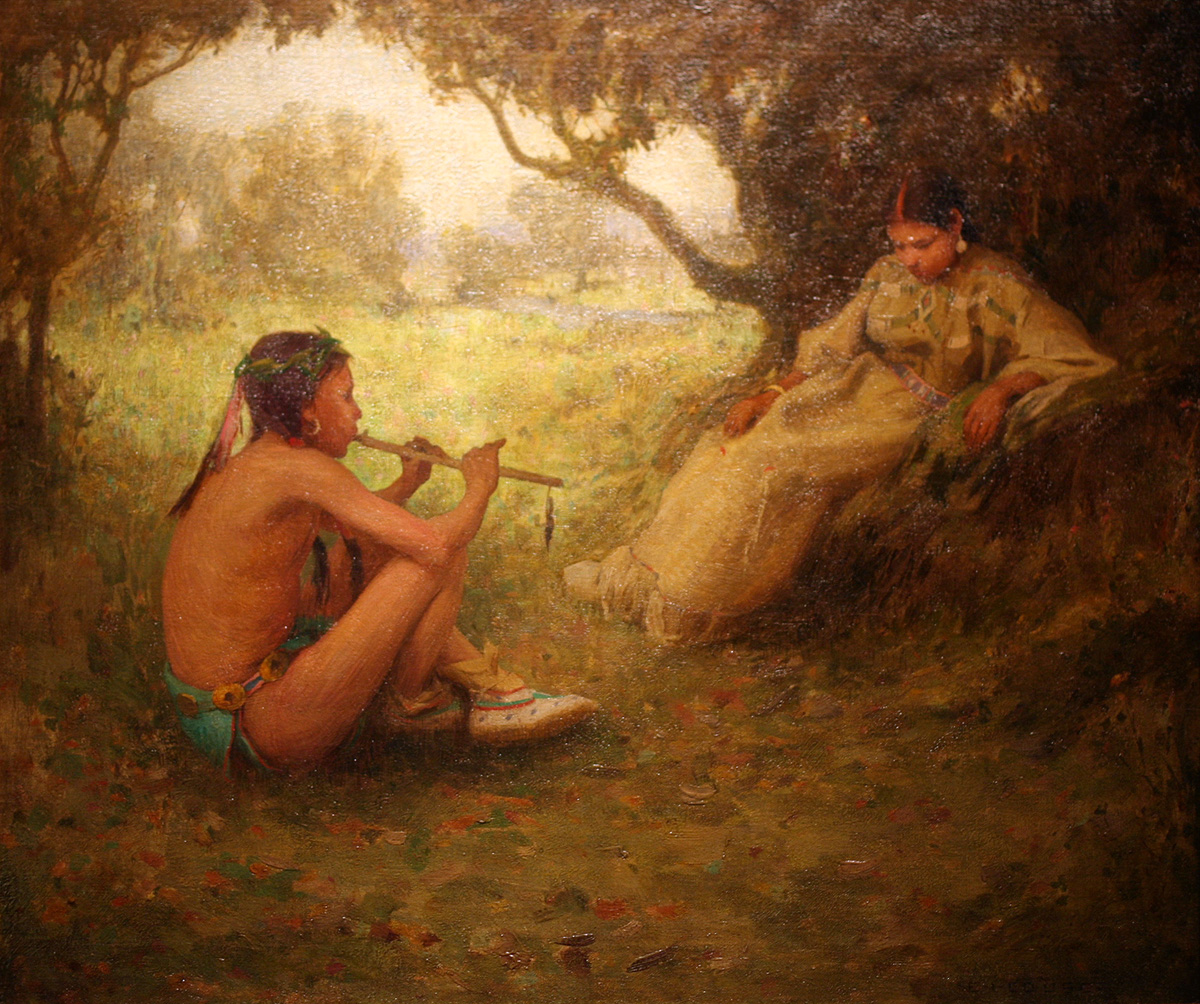
E. Irving Couse, Lovers (Indian Love Song), 1905

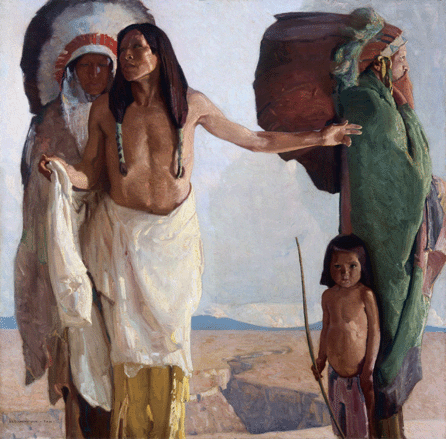
Ernest L. Blumenschein, The Peacemaker (The Orator), 1913, Courtesy of the Anschutz Collection

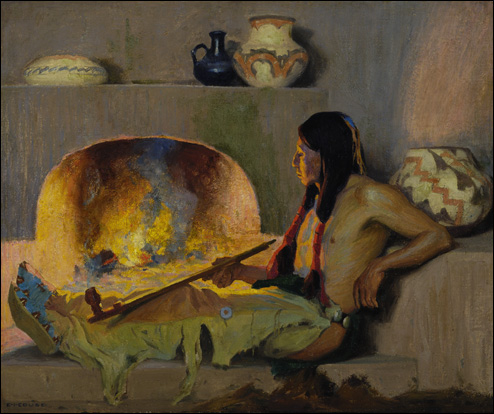
E. Irving Couse, Contentment, 1918

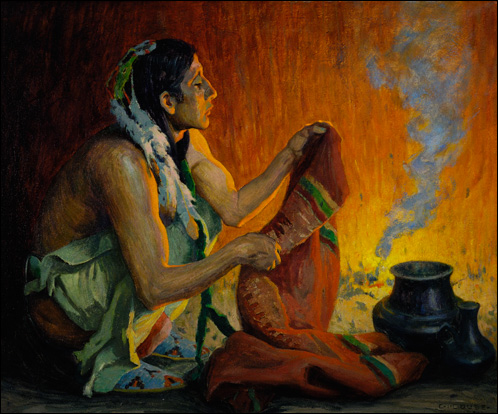
E. Irving Couse, Smoke Ceremony, 1919

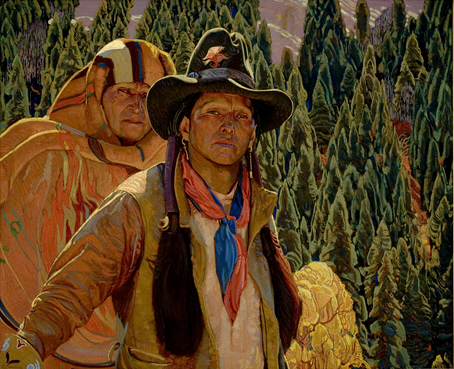
Ernest L. Blumenschein, Star Road and White Sun, 1920, Albuquerque Museum of Art and History, New Mexico

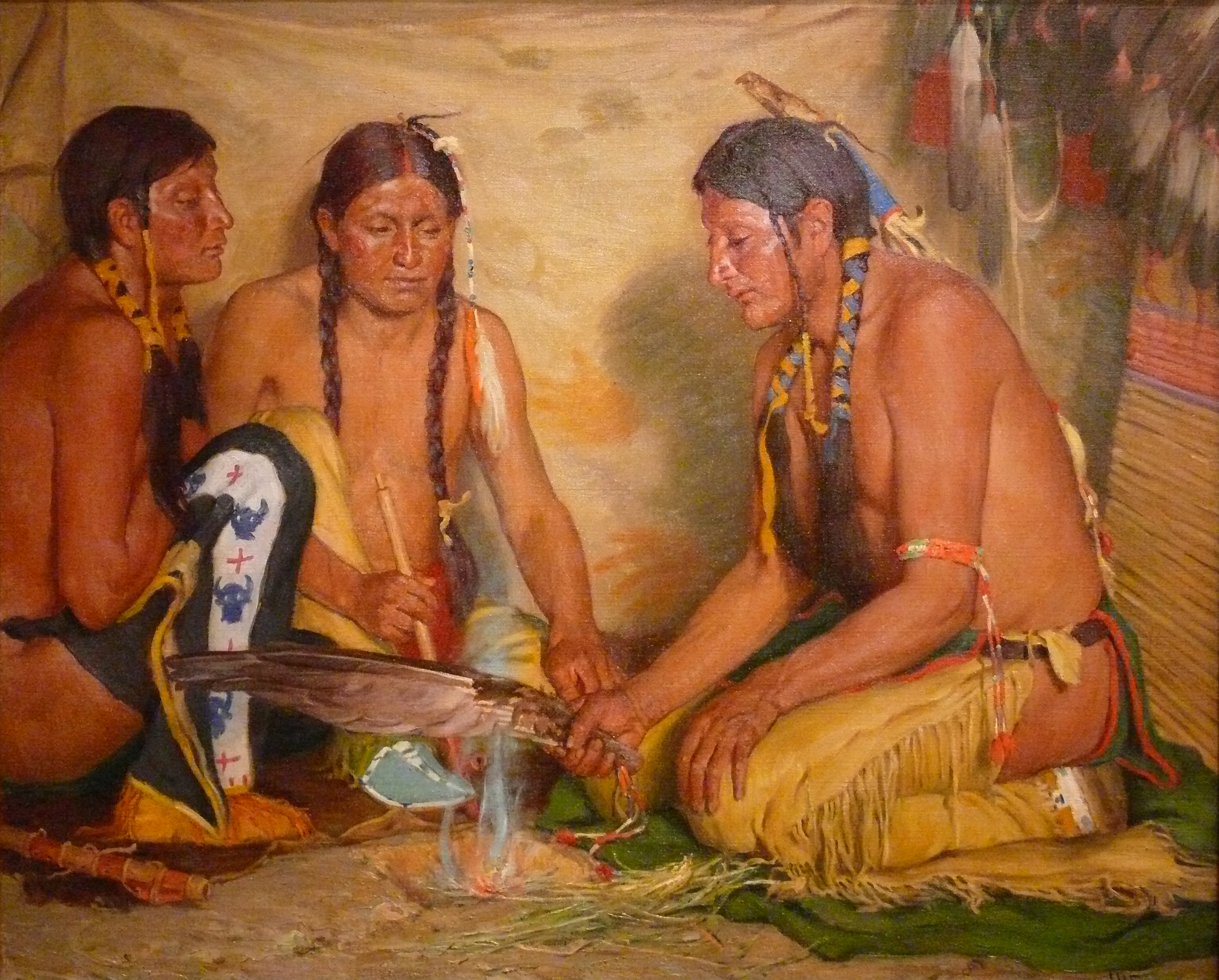
Joseph Henry Sharp, Making Sweet Grass Medicine, Blackfoot Ceremony, ca. 1920, Smithsonian American Art Museum, Washington, D.C.

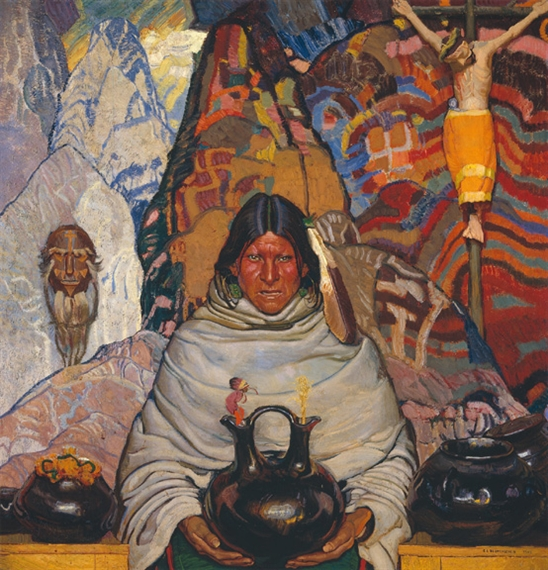
Ernest L. Blumenschein, Superstition, 1921

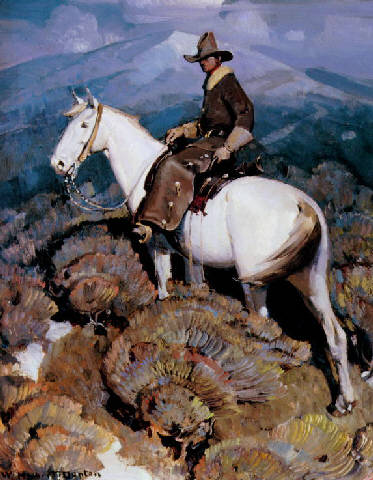
William Herbert Dunton, The Horse Rustler, ca. 1915

== Structure and membership ==
Member artists had to have worked in Taos for three consecutive years, shown an interest and aptitude for painting Native Americans and have shown in reputable galleries or New York salons (ongoing art exhibits). The primary reason for the requirements was to ensure that the artists were well-intentioned and capable of capturing the character and spirit of the people.

Later members included Julius Rolshoven, E. Martin Hennings, Catharine C. Critcher (the only female member), Kenneth Adams, Walter Ufer, and Victor Higgins.

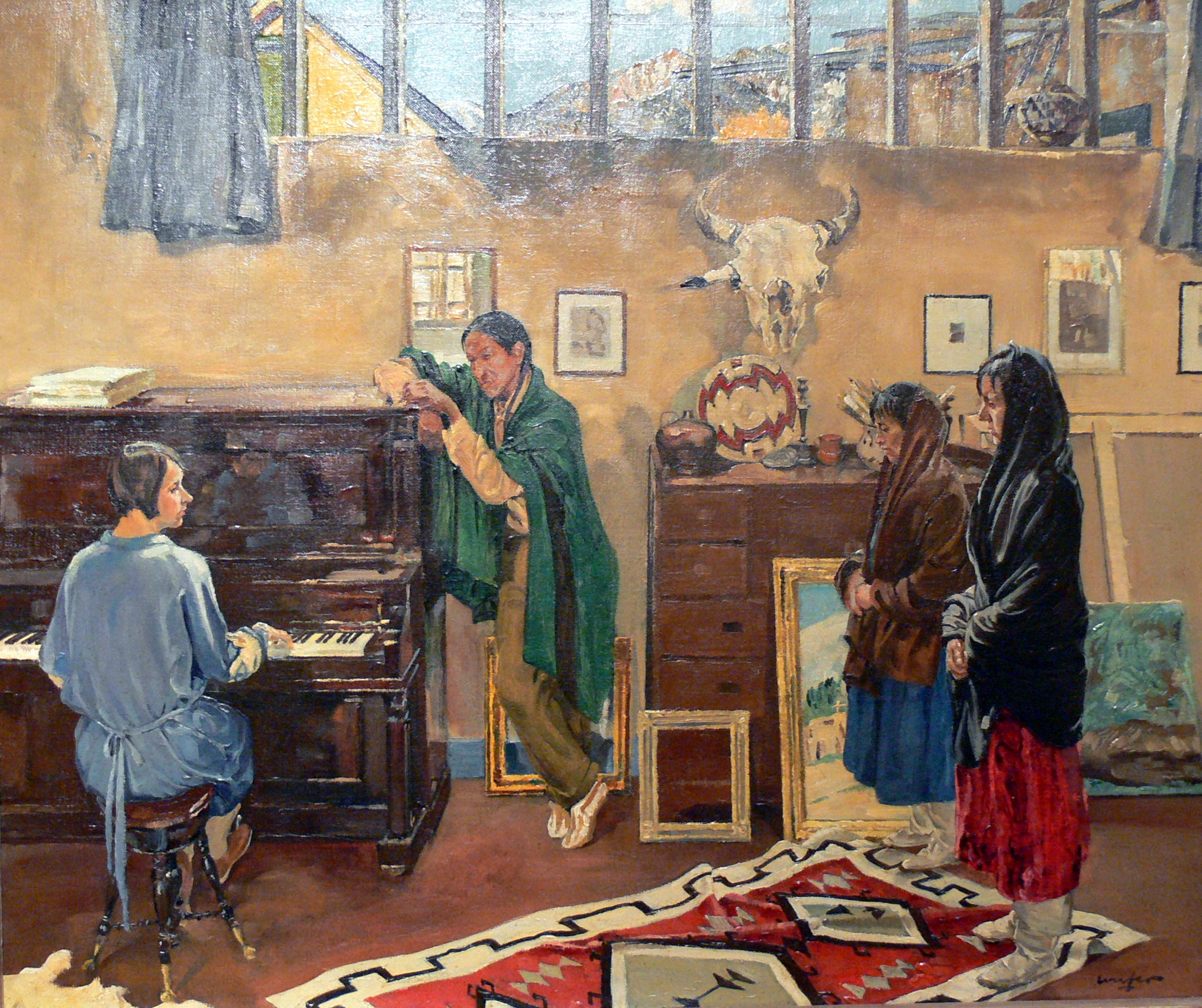
Walter Ufer, The Listeners, 1920, Philbrook Museum in Tulsa, Oklahoma

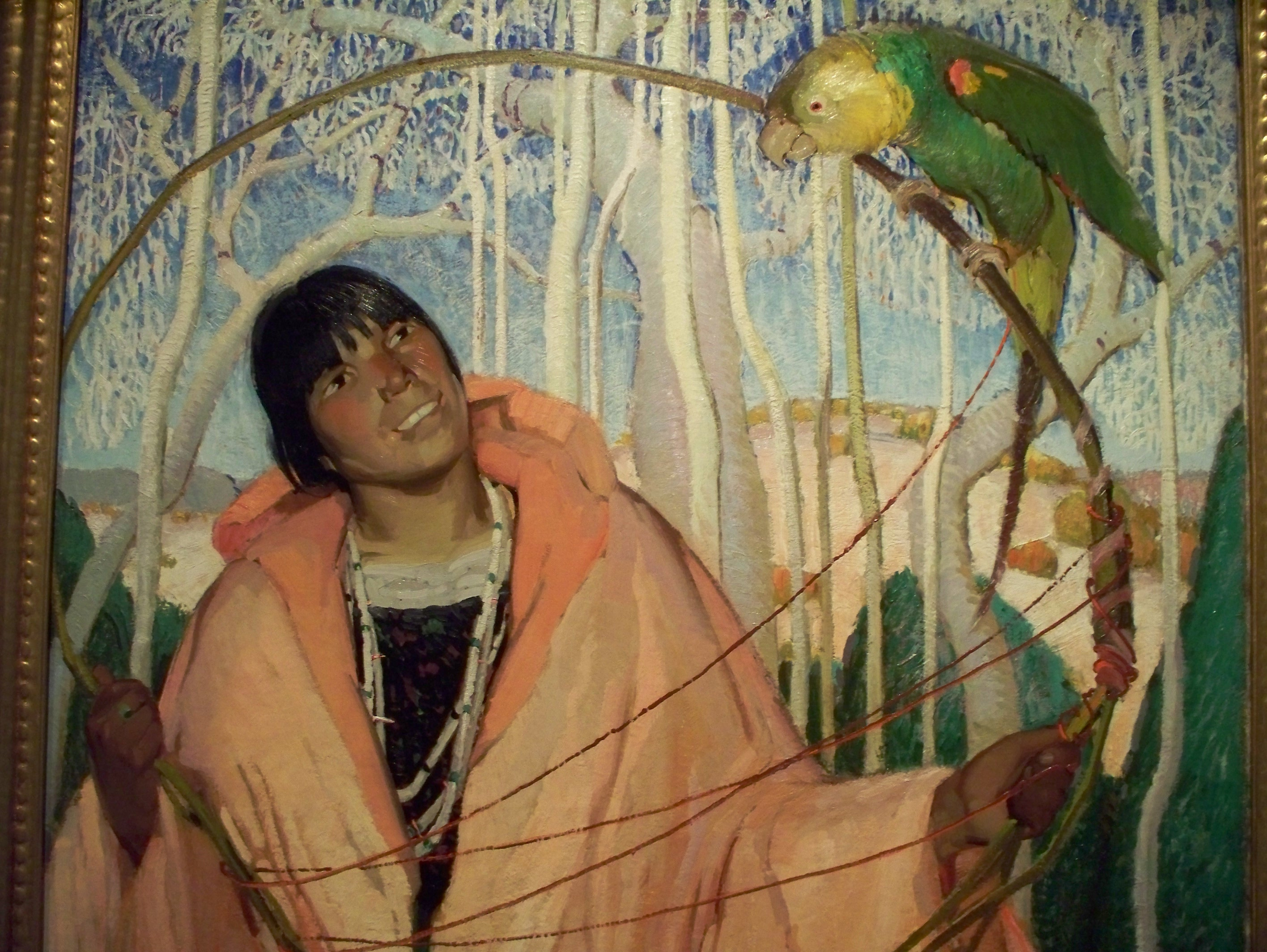
Victor Higgins, Indian Girl with Parrot and Hoop, ca. 1920, Indianapolis Museum of Art

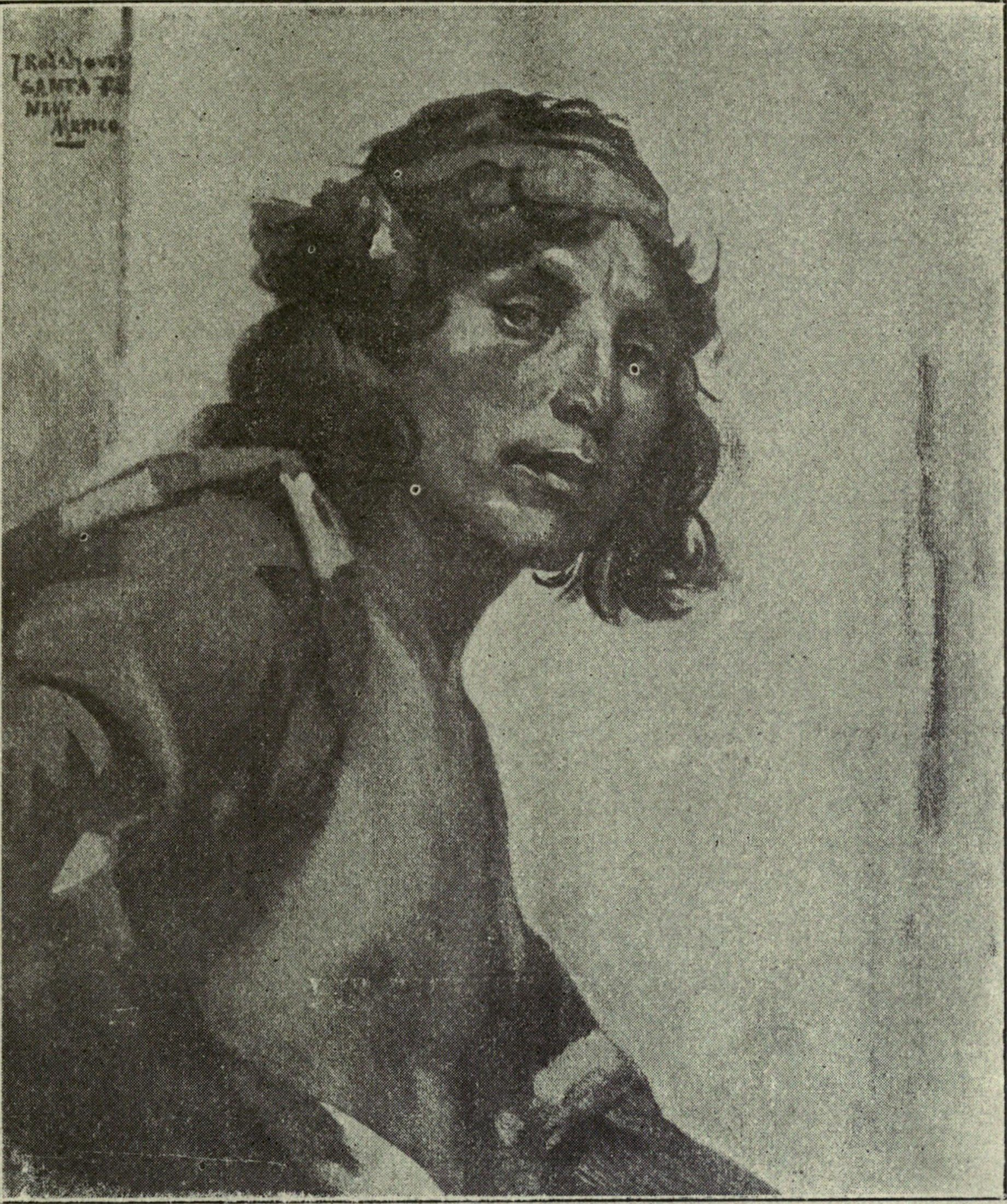
Julius Rolshoven, The Sun, Tesuque Pueblo Indian, 1921

== Associate and honorary members ==
Some artists from Santa Fe, another developing arts center, were included as Associate members: Robert Henri, Albert L. Groll, Randall Davey, B.J.O. Nordfeldt, Gustave Baumann, Birger Sandzén, and John Sloan.

Honorary memberships were extended to men who helped create a museum infrastructure in New Mexico: Edgar L. Hewett, the director of the Museum of New Mexico; and Frank Springer, whose donations helped to build the Museum of New Mexico’s Fine Arts Museum in Santa Fe.

== War work ==
During World War I, the Taos society artists served on United War Work Committees, designed posters, and exhibited canvases at Red Cross bazaars. Most notably they created "range-finder paintings", 50 by 100 foot landscapes of Belgium and France used as military teaching tools. Several of these paintings were exhibited in the 1918 Taos Society of Artists' annual exhibition held at the Museum of New Mexico

== Depression ==
The Great Depression was the precipitating factor for the dissolution of the Taos Society of Artists. Taos was devastated by the Depression and the artist's patrons were not spending money on art during that time. Victor Higgins the most financially devastated by the Depression made two of his most important paintings during that time, Winter Funeral heralded by the New York press, and Sleeping Nude similarly praised by the Chicago Herald Examiner writer Inez Cunningham Stark. Cunningham likened Higgins to a phoenix rising out of the ashes, "what heights of intellectual and emotional fire. He is one of those fortunate few who continued their career into maturity."

== Influence ==
The "Taos Six" applied academic techniques to Native themes to produce a uniquely American school of painting. Each artist's style was unique, though cross influence can be noted as can elements of their European Academic artistic training. Aside from the inspiration of their environment, one quality early Taos art colony paintings share is their vibrant palette of colors - not a common sight when paired with more traditional representational images and application of paint. Today, these artists are recognized for their contribution to artistic development and their scenes of Taos locales hang on the walls of many museums.

== See also ==
- Eanger Irving Couse House and Studio—Joseph Henry Sharp Studios
- Ernest L. Blumenschein House
- Los Cinco Pintores, contemporaneous artist collective in Santa Fe

== Bibliography ==
- James, G. (1920). New Mexico: The Land of the Delight Makers. Boston: The Page Company.
