= William Victor Higgins =

American painter (1884–1949)

Victor Higgins
- Born: William Victor Higgins; June 28, 1884; Shelbyville, Indiana, U.S.
- Died: August 23, 1949 (aged 65); Taos, New Mexico, U.S.
- Resting place: Sierra Vista Cemetery, Taos, New Mexico, U.S.
- Education: Art Institute of Chicago
- Known for: Painting
- Style: Realist, modernist
- Movement: Taos Society of Artists
- Spouse(s): Sara Parsons; Marion Koogler McNay
- Patrons: Carter Harrison IV

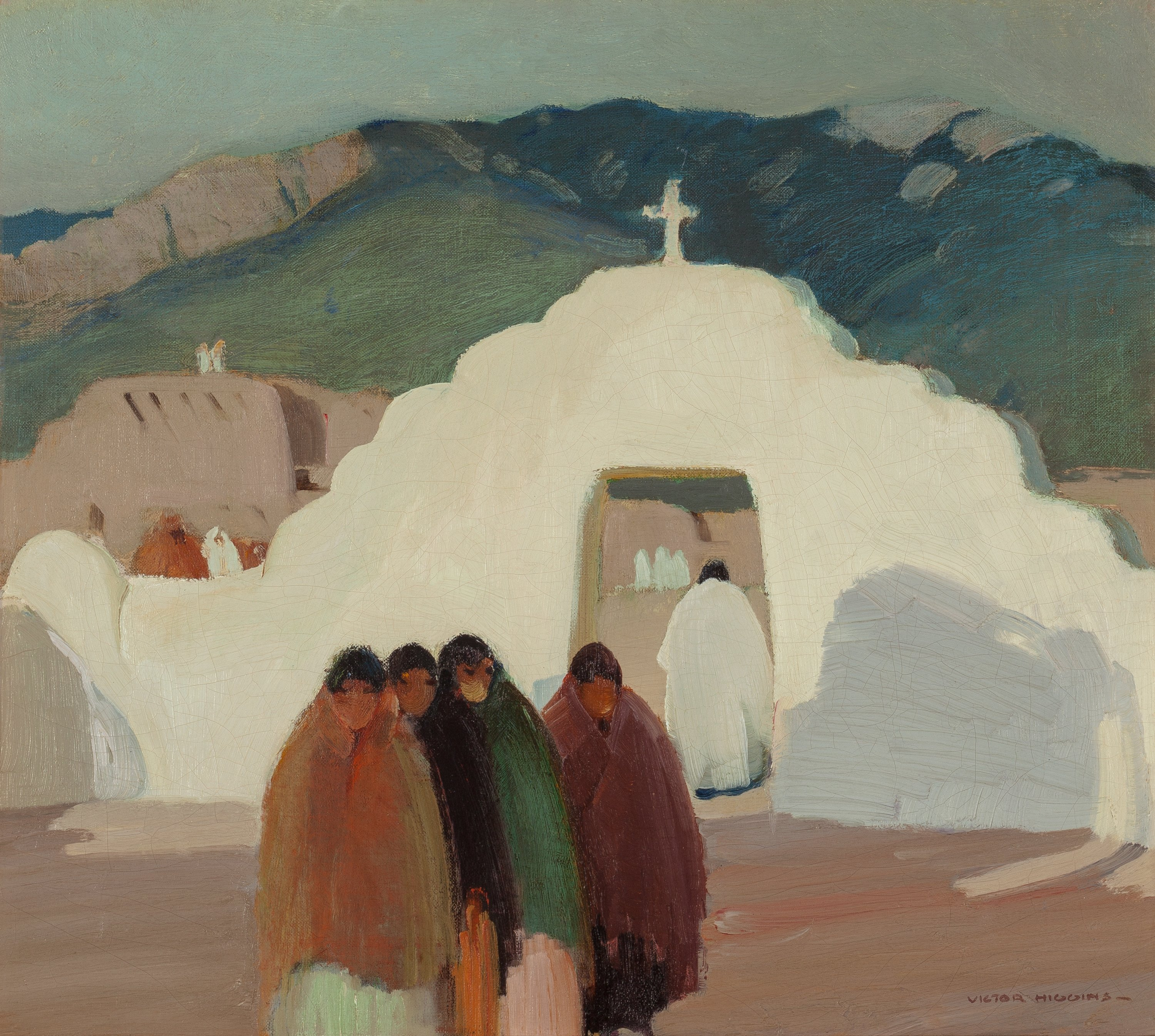
The White Gate (1919)

William Victor Higgins (June 28, 1884 – August 23, 1949) was an American painter and teacher, born in Shelbyville, Indiana. At the age of fifteen, he moved to Chicago, where he studied at the Art Institute in Chicago and at the Chicago Academy of Fine Arts. In Paris he was a pupil of Robert Henri, René Menard and Lucien Simon, and when he was in Munich he studied with Hans von Hayek. He was an associate of the National Academy of Design. Higgins moved to Taos, New Mexico in 1913 and joined the Taos Society of Artists (alongside E. Irving Couse, Joseph Henry Sharp, Oscar E. Berninghaus and others) in 1917. In 1923 he was on the founding board of the Harwood Foundation with Elizabeth (Lucy) Harwood and Bert Phillips.

== Personal ==
He married Sara Parsons, daughter of Santa Fe painter, Sheldon Parsons, and they had a daughter, Joan. He was later briefly married to Marion Koogler McNay of San Antonio, Texas.

== Artwork ==
While living in New Mexico, he often painted portraits of Native American women. During the Depression, he was commissioned to paint a mural inside the Taos County Courthouse financed by the PWAP, titled Moises, El Legislador.

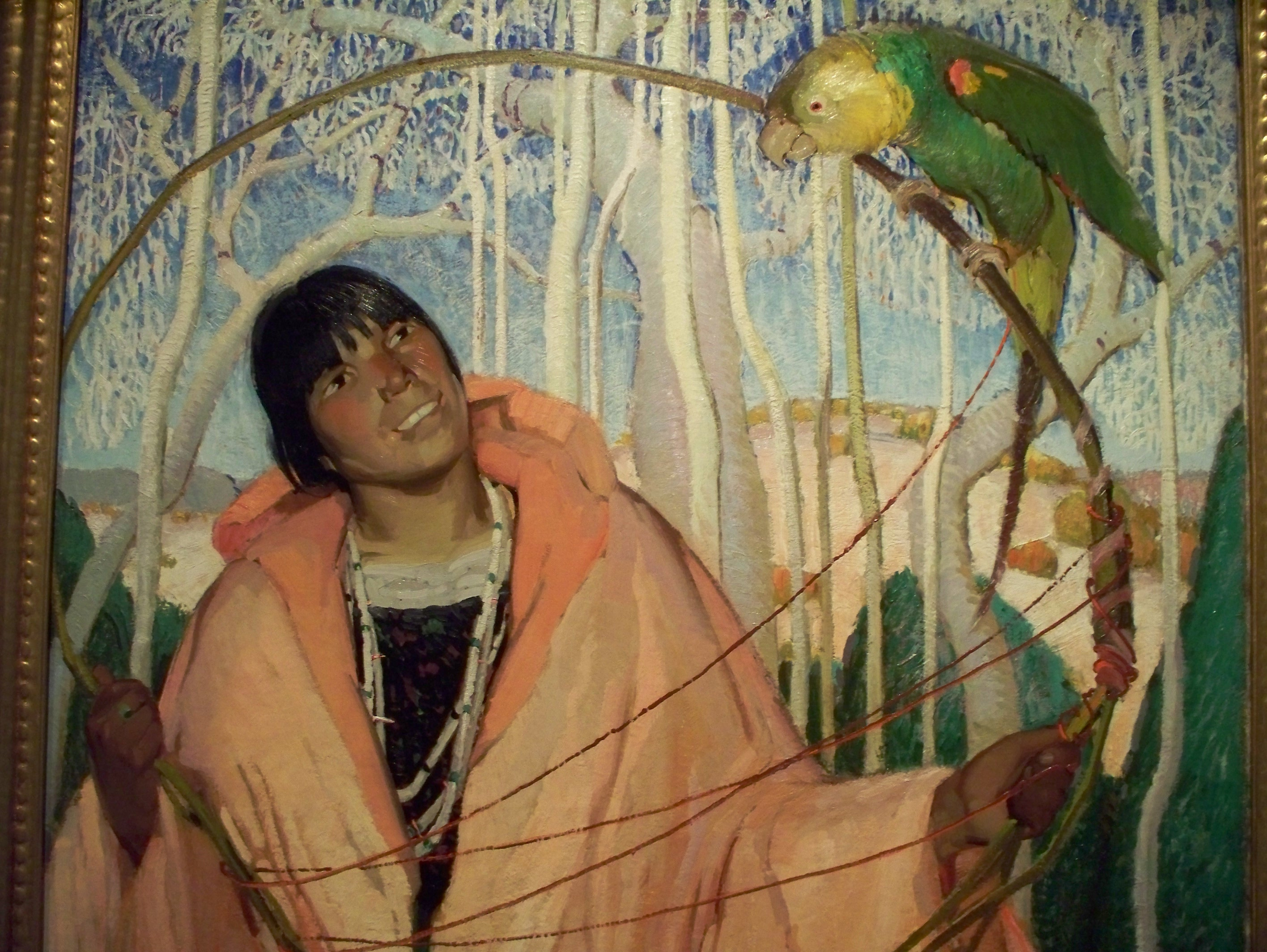
WLA ima Higgins Indian Girl with Parrot and Hoop

Among his paintings are:

- "Winter Funeral," in Harwood Museum of Art, Taos, New Mexico
- "Moorland Gorse and Bracken," in the Municipal Gallery, Chicago
- "Moorland Piper," Terre Haute Art Association
- "Juanito, the Suspicious Cat," In the Union League Club, Chicago
- "Women of Taos," Santa Fe Railroad
- "A Shrine to St. Anthony," Des Moines Association of Fine Arts
- "Fiesta Day," Butler Art Institute, Youngstown, Ohio
- "Pueblo of Taos," Los Angeles Museum
- "Indian at Stream," Los Angeles Museum
- "Taos from the Hillside," Richmond Art Museum
- "Baking Bread, Taos", Eiteljorg Museum, Indianapolis
- "The Blue Shawl", Eiteljorg Museum
- "Talpa Landscape", Eiteljorg Museum
- "Abiquiu Country", Eiteljorg Museum
- "New Mexico Skies", Snite Museum of Art
- "Taos Street in Winter", New Mexico Museum of Art
- "Floral Still Life", New Mexico Museum of Art
- "Pablita Passes", New Mexico Museum of Art
- "Indian Paint Brush," New Mexico Museum of Art
- "Oka and Walmacho," University of Michigan Museum of Art
- "Arroyo Landscape," Smithsonian American Art Museum
- "Mountain Forms #2," Smithsonian American Art Museum
- "Valley Spring," Smithsonian American Art Museum
- "A Market Place in France," Medicine Man Gallery

== Sources ==
- "William Victor Higgins (1884-1949)". tfaoi.com. Indianapolis, IN: Eiteljorg Museum. June 30, 2010.
