= W. Herbert Dunton =

American artist (1878–1936)

W. Herbert "Buck" Dunton
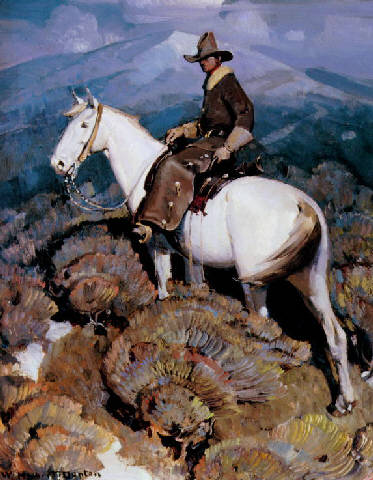
- The Horse Rustler, ca. 1915
- Born: August 28, 1878; Augusta, Maine
- Died: March 18, 1936; Taos, New Mexico
- Known for: Painting
- Movement: Taos Society of Artists

William Herbert "Buck" Dunton (August 28, 1878 – March 18, 1936) was an American artist and a founding member of the Taos Society of Artists. He is noted for paintings of cowboys, New Mexico, and the American Southwest.

== Early life and education ==
Dunton worked as a ranch hand as a youth and studied at the Cowles Art School in Boston, Massachusetts. He moved to New York City around 1903, where he worked as an illustrator for publishing companies. In 1912 he briefly studied at the Art Student's League, where Ernest Blumenschein told him about Taos, New Mexico.

== Artistic career ==
He first visited Taos in 1912 and became part of the Taos art colony. Dunton became one of the founding members of the Taos Society of Artists in 1915.

Among his proteges in Western art was Harold Dow Bugbee of Clarendon and Canyon in the Texas Panhandle.

In 1921, American oil executive W. H. McFadden commissioned Dunton to paint a full-length portrait of big-game hunter Ben Lilly. The portrait was exhibited by the National Academy of Design before being located in McFadden's home in New Orleans. His work was part of the painting event in the art competition at the 1932 Summer Olympics.
