= Ernest L. Blumenschein =

American painter (1874–1960)

- Haystack, Taos Valley, before 1927. Oil on canvas. Museum of Art, University of Oklahoma
- Born: May 26, 1874; Pittsburgh, Pennsylvania
- Died: June 6, 1960 (aged 86); Albuquerque, New Mexico
- Education: Art Students League of New York; Académie Julian
- Known for: Painting
- Movement: Taos Society of Artists
- Spouse: Mary Greene

Ernest Leonard Blumenschein (May 26, 1874 – June 6, 1960) was an American artist and founding member of the Taos Society of Artists. He is noted for paintings of Native Americans, New Mexico and the American Southwest.

== Early life and education ==
Ernest Blumenschein was born on May 26, 1874, in Pittsburgh, Pennsylvania, near fellow German immigrant families. In 1877, his father accepted a position as director of the Dayton Philharmonic in Ohio, where Blumenschein grew up. When he finished high school, Blumenschein received a scholarship to study violin at the College of Music of Cincinnati.

While in Cincinnati, he also attended an illustration course from Fernand Lungren at the Cincinnati Art Academy, causing him to change his studies from music to art. He moved to New York City in 1892, studying at the Art Students League of New York. Attracted by the idea of studying art in Europe, he enrolled at the Académie Julian in Paris in 1894. There he met and became friends with Bert Phillips and the older and more experienced artist Joseph Henry Sharp, who told the two younger artists about his 1893 visit to Taos, New Mexico.

== Career ==
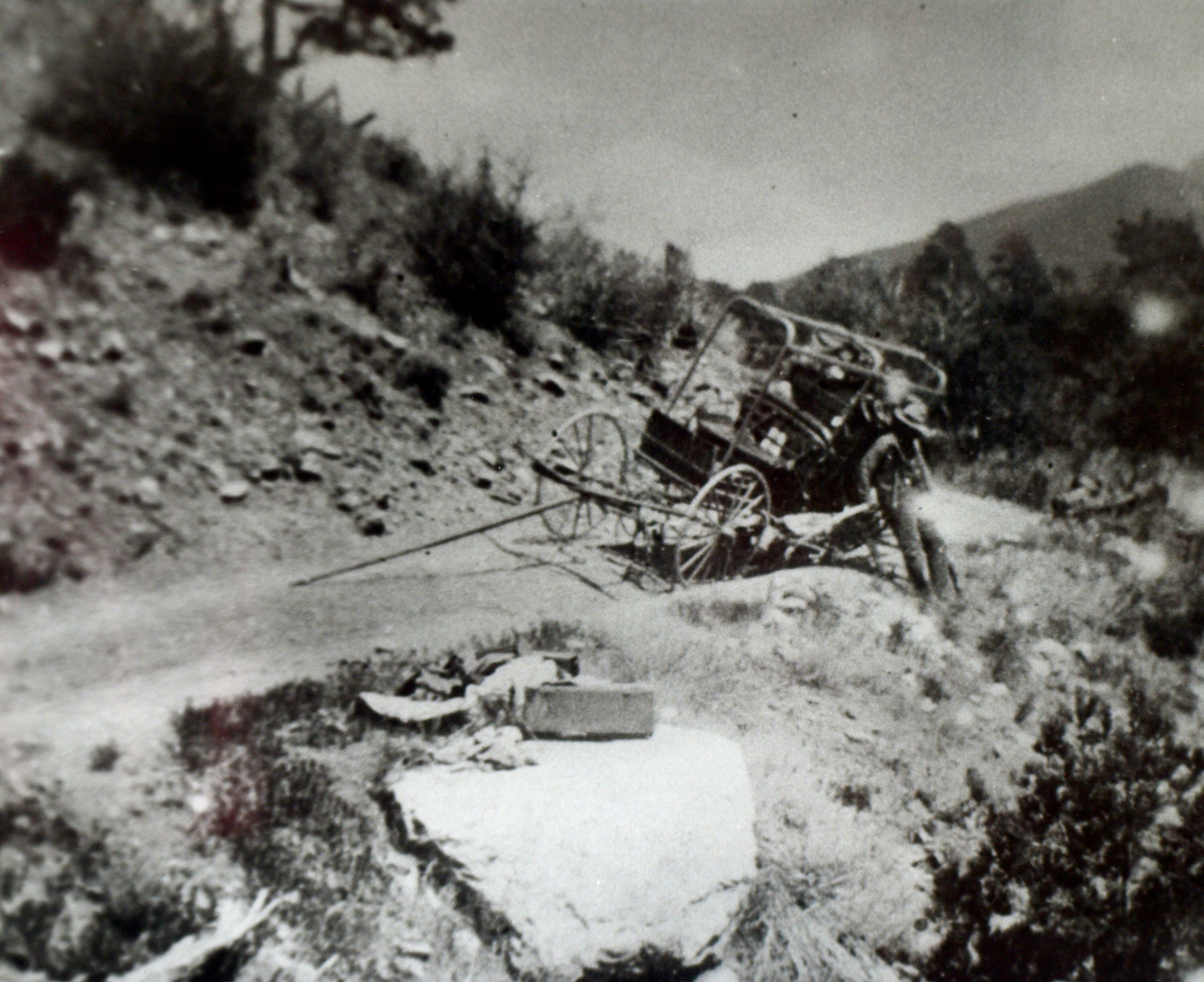
The accident that started the Taos art colony, 1898.

Blumenschein returned to New York in 1896, to work as an illustrator in a studio shared with Bert Phillips. In early 1898, he took an assignment that required him to travel to Arizona and New Mexico. That Spring, he convinced Phillips to join him on a second journey to the American West. Their first stop was Denver, Colorado, where they bought art and camping supplies, a wagon, horses and a revolver. Thus equipped, they set out with the intention of reaching Mexico.

In northern New Mexico, the rough road caused a wagon wheel to break. Blumenschein brought the wheel to be repaired in nearby Taos, leaving Phillips alone with the wagon. When Blumenschein returned three days later with the repaired wheel, they continued to Taos, where they sold their horse and equipage, set up a studio and began to paint.

Blumenschein stayed in Taos for three months, returning to New York to resume his career as an illustrator of popular magazines and books (including two short stories by Jack London), while Phillips remained in Taos. Blumenschein returned twice to Paris to pursue further studies at Académie Julian: once in 1899 and again from 1902 to 1909. During the latter stay, he met and married artist Mary Shepard Greene.

The couple returned to New York in 1909, where they worked as an illustration team. Blumenschein also took a teaching position at his alma mater, the Art Students League of New York.

From 1910, he spent his summers in Taos. In 1915, he became a co-founder of the Taos Society of Artists, together with his friends Bert Phillips, Joseph Henry Sharp, and three other artists. He finally settled permanently in Taos in 1919. From 1920 to 1921 he served as president of the Society. In 1923, he refused to accept the position of secretary of the Society, giving his commitment to an office of The New Mexico Painters, another group he had helped form, as his reason for the refusal. The other members of the Society refused to accept his excuse, and after a heated argument, Blumenschein resigned from the Society.

The style of painting of the Taos painters was to decisively influence the perceptions that the wider world came to have of the American Southwest, specifically of the Pueblo and Navajo Indian peoples.

During World War I, Blumenschein led a national effort to produce range-finder paintings used to help train military gunners.

== Honors and awards ==
In 1910, Blumenschein was elected into the National Academy of Design as an Associate member, and became a full member in 1927. In 1947 he was awarded an Honorary Master of Arts from University of New Mexico and the following year he was named Honorary Fellow in Fine Arts by the School of American Research.

== Collections ==
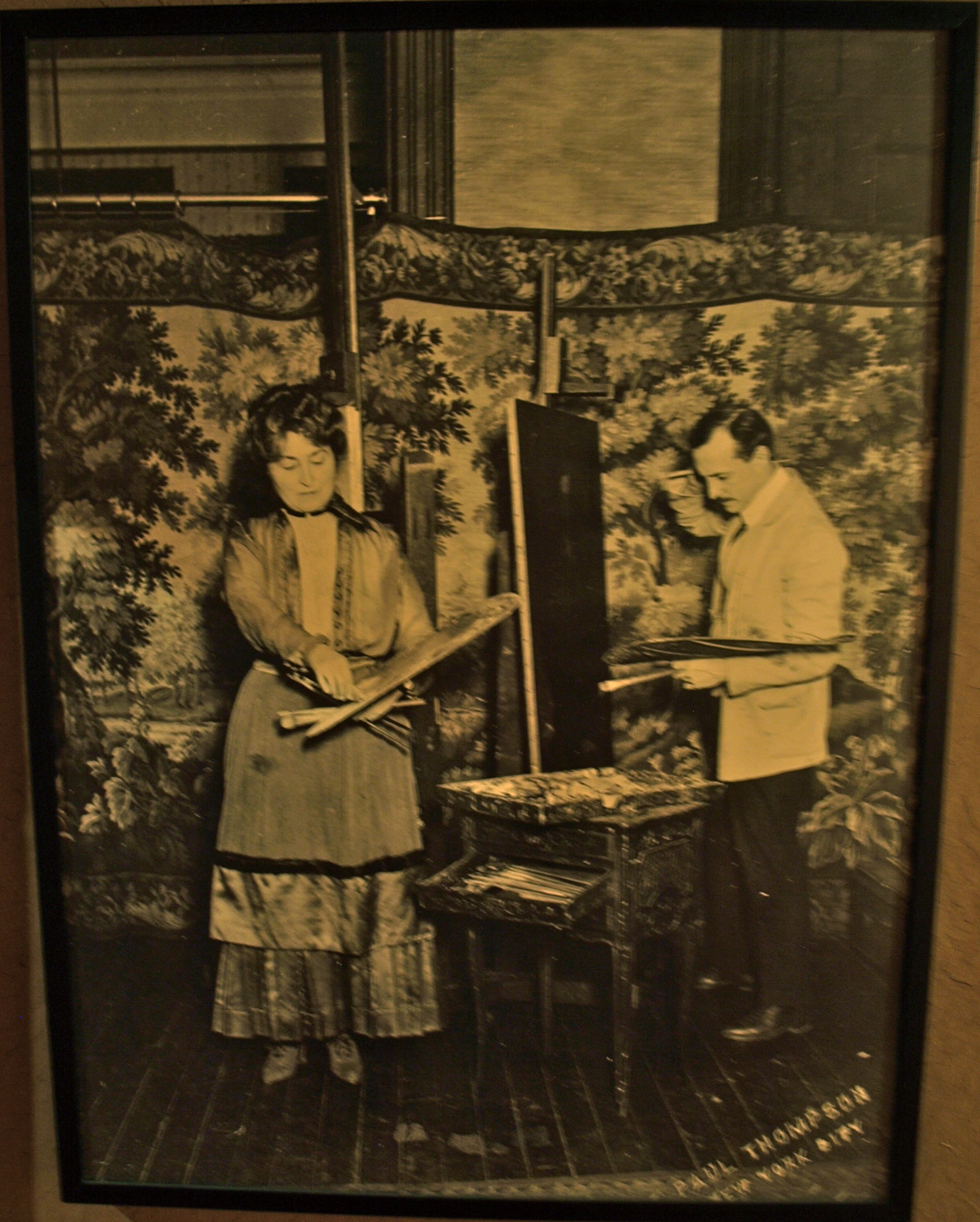
Ernest and Mary Blumenschein, New York, 1910.

Paintings by Blumenschein are held in the Eiteljorg Museum of American Indians and Western Art in Indianapolis, Indiana, the Harwood Museum of Art in Taos, the Taos Art Museum and Fechin House, the New Mexico Museum of Art in Santa Fe, and the El Paso Art Museum in El Paso, Texas.

== See also ==
- Ernest L. Blumenschein House, his home in Taos, New Mexico
- Oscar E. Berninghaus
- E. Irving Couse
- W. Herbert Dunton
- E. Martin Hennings
