= Portrait of Jack Hunter =

1923 painting by Nicolai Fechin

Portrait of Jack R. Hunter
- Artist: Nicolai Fechin
- Year: 1923
- Medium: Oil on canvas
- Dimensions: 50 cm × 40 cm (20 in × 16 in)
- Location: Russian Museum; Saint Petersburg

Portrait of Jack Hunter (Russian: Портрет Джека Хантера) is a painting by the Russian-American artist Nicolai Fechin (1881–1955) from the collection of the State Russian Museum in Saint Petersburg. The author portrayed an employee of the American insurance company and collector Jack R. Hunter. The portrait has a special value for the Russian Museum collection, as it represents the American period of the artist's work.

== Background ==
Artist Nicolai Fechin, a student of Ilya Repin, arrived in New York on August 1, 1923 with his wife Alexandra Nikolaevna and daughter Iya. Portrait of Jack R. Hunter, dating from 1923, is one of the first works painted by the artist after moving to the United States.

Jack R. Hunter worked as an employee of a major insurance company in Pittsburgh and was fond of collecting art. In 1923 Jack Hunter was in absentia familiar with Fechin for more than ten years. From 1910 until the outbreak of World War I, Fechin was a regular participant in international art exhibitions in Pittsburgh, which the Carnegie Institution organized annually. There were several excellent paintings by N. Fechin, including Nude (1911, private collection, USA), Portrait of P. Abramychev (1912, private collection, USA), Portrait of A.N. Belkovich (1913, Museum of the University of Oklahoma, USA) in the collection of J. Hunter by 1923.

Since 1921 Jack R. Hunter and another well-known American collector of Fechin's works, William S. Stimmel, had been working to prepare Fechin's move to America. It was Hunter who played the main role in obtaining the necessary documents for the Fechin family's entry into the United States. Thanks to efforts of Jack Hunter Stephen G. Porter, chairman of the Committee on Foreign Affairs helped them in this matter.

The emigration quota for Russians was then 5000 peoples in a year. In addition, the United States did not recognize Soviet Russia and an American visa could not be placed on the Fechin's Soviet passport. With the assistance of Hunter, an exit was organized through Riga. Fechin had the necessary letters of recommendation addressed to various American consuls.

By the request of William Stimmel and Jack Hunter Fechin's family was met at the port of New York by the Russian emigrant artist Aaron Harry Gorson, who also placed the Fechins in a hotel, and then rented an apartment for them. Soon J. Hunter came to New York and their first personal meeting with Feshin took place.

Fechin expressed a wish to paint a portrait of Jack R. Hunter in gratitude for his help with moving artist's family to America and it was done. Since 1923 until recently The Portrait of Jack R. Hunter was kept in the family of a collector.

In 1958 soon after Fechin's death Jack Hunter wrote his memories of Fechin at the request of Iya Nikolaevna Feshin-Branham, Fechin's daughter.

== Russian acquisition ==
In the middle of 2010 Portrait of Jack R. Hunter appeared in the art market and was put up for sale by one of the galleries in New Mexico (US). In 2016 the portrait was purchased by Mrs. Elena Buhtina, the owner of the "Blue Hall Gallery" from St. Petersburg, Russia, located in the building of the Saint Petersburg Union of Artists at Bolshaya Morskaya Street, 38. It was officially imported to Russia on August 31, 2016. In course of the next two days experts of the Russian Museum carried out an examination of the painting, which confirmed the authorship of N. Fechin. On September 3, 2016 Elena Bukhtina was detained by customs officers at Pulkovo Airport while trying to illegally export Portrait of Jack R. Hunter to China. The undeclared picture had been hidden by Bukhtina in a suitcase. She did not have the permits for the export of paintings as well as documents on the payment of export duties.

According to V. Kraevsky, senior investigator for especially important cases of the FSB Directorate for St. Petersburg and the Leningrad Region, "the very scheme of the crime was simple and banal. The lawbreaker put the picture in her suitcase and went along the "green" corridor, without having issued any documents".

At first, Elena Bukhtina (also known as Elena Lysak) tried to deny her guilt and involvement in the incident. Later she admitted her guilt in full, repented and petitioned for a special trial of the case.

At the end of April 2017 the Moscow District Court of St. Petersburg sentenced Bukhtina to three years' imprisonment with a probation period of three years on the basis of the investigation of the criminal case against E. Bukhtina (Part 1 art.226.1 of the Criminal Code of the Russian Federation (illegal transfer of cultural property across the customs border of the Russian Federation, in relation to which special rules of displacement are established). On the basis of the same Court decision, Portrait of Jack R. Hunter by Nikolai Feshin was declared state property.

On October 24, 2017 the transfer ceremony of Portrait of Jack R. Hunter to the collections of the Russian Museum was held in the Mikhailovsky Palace in Saint Petersburg.

Currently, the Russian Museum's collection contains about ten works by N. Fechin, all the Russian period, painted before moving to the United States. Portrait of Jack R. Hunter is the first example of Fechin's American period in the museum's collection. According to E. Petrova, deputy director for scientific work, the painting has undoubted value for the Russian Museum.

== See also ==
- Nicolai Fechin

== Sources ==
- Nicolai Fechin Biography and examples of artwork
- Фешин Н. И. Документы, письма, воспоминания о художнике / Составитель и автор комментариев Г. Могильникова. М., Художник РСФСР, 1975. (in Russian)
- Тулузакова Г. П. Николай Фешин. Альбом. СПб, Золотой век, 2007. (in Russian)
- Тулузакова Г. П. Роль У. С. Стиммела и казанского представительства A.R.A. в организации эмиграции Н. И. Фешина (по материалам архива наследников художника) // Изобразительное искусство, архитектура и искусствоведение Русского зарубежья / Отв. реж. О. Л. Лейкинд. СПб, 2008. С.159-166. (in Russian)
- Давтян Л. Долгое возвращение Николая Фешина. Иные берега, № 4 (28), 2012. (in Russian)
