= Pouring (Fechin) =

1914 painting by Russian artist Nicolai Fechin

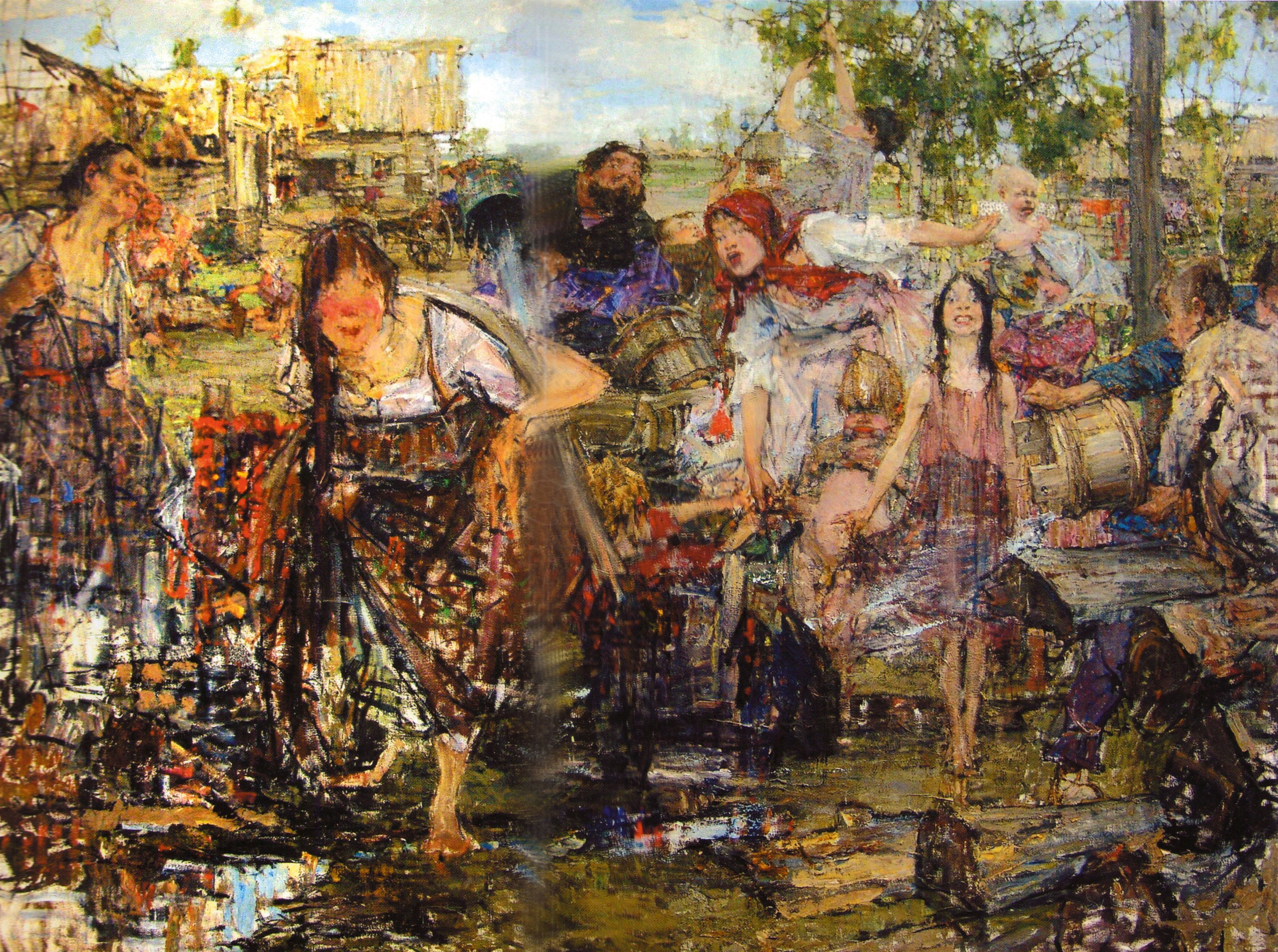
- Artist: Nicolai Fechin
- Year: 1914 (?)
- Medium: Oil on canvas
- Location: State Museum of Fine Arts of the Republic of Tatarstan; Kazan

Pouring (Russian: Облива́ние) is a painting by the Russian, Soviet, and American artist Nicolai Fechin created in 1914 in Kazan. (Note: Art historian S. M. Chervonnaya dates the painting to 1911. Art historian G. P. Tuluzakova in her 2012 catalog gives 1914–1916, although in her 1998 dissertation she asserts 1911. An earlier 1992 catalog also gives 1911, as preparatory studies and sketches for this work in the same catalog are dated 1911–1914.) The canvas is held in the collection of the State Museum of Fine Arts of the Republic of Tatarstan, and is currently on display in the Fechin Hall of the National Art Gallery "Khazine" (a museum's branch).

Fechin's painting depicts a village custom of pouring water on those who pass by a well during summer heat. Peasants considered that it was a magical way of preventing drought. The Christian notion of "washing away sins" merged in this custom with memories of pagan rituals for "calling rain". Art historian Dmitry Seryakov considered Pouring a continuation in Fechin's work of the ethnographic theme, which by the time of the painting's creation had already been reflected in such genre paintings of his as Bearing Away the Bride and Kapustnitsa. Seryakov called these three paintings of the artist "ritualistic". In his opinion, the artist sought in them not so much to demonstrate scenes of folk life as to show a way of life captured in specific rituals.

== Subject ==
The action happens near a well against the backdrop of a village landscape with izbas with straw roofs, along paths trodden in the grass. The center of the canvas features a scene at a shadoof. A boy, standing on the well's log frame, strains to pull up a bucket tied to a rope from the well. Next to him, a peasant with a full beard, in a dark vest and purple shirt, vigorously douses nearby village women with water from another bucket. In the left part of the canvas, there is a young peasant woman. Bent over, picking up her soaked dress (implying she has just been doused by pranksters), she walks straight toward the viewer. Her bare feet step through puddles reflecting the blue sky. The left edge of the painting cuts off the barely sketched figure of an old woman with a carrying pole (art historian Voronov believed she looks on with laughter at the spectacle unfolding before her eyes). In the center of the right half of the canvas, the artist depicted a shivering girl with wet hair and clothes. She stands facing the viewer, holding her wet pink dress so it does not cling to her body, while another stream of water pours onto her legs.

Behind the girl, the artist placed in "free dynamic poses" another girl holding a crying infant in her arms, and a young woman in a red headscarf and bright lilac sarafan, whose child is taking a bucket of water from her. On the right, the edges faintly suggest, in Seryakov's words, "either a stack of firewood or simply logs piled on each other and the figures of two boys, cut off by the edge of the canvas" (Voronov believed they were busy drawing water).

== Creation history ==
The idea for the painting Pouring came to Fechin when he visited the village of Nadezhdino in Laishevsky Uyezd of Kazan Governorate, where he came for en plein air studies. The first director of the Kazan Art School, N. N. Belkovich, had a small estate in Nadezhdino. Both artists and school students visited him. Nicolai Fechin was a frequent guest of Belkovich. Art historian Ekaterina Klyuchevskaya asserts that linking a genre painting to a specific geographical point is characteristic of Fechin's work. As examples, she cites the canvas Bearing Away the Bride, whose action takes place in the villages of Kushnya andorki in Tsaryovokokshaysky Uyezd of Kazan Governorate, and other works by the master.

=== The custom of pouring in the Russian village ===
Fechin chose as the subject for his painting the custom that existed in Russian villages of pouring water on everyone who passed by a well during summer heat. Peasants perceived this custom not only as a joke or game: it was considered a magical way of preventing drought. Voronov writes that most often such a rite was performed closer to Trinity Sunday (honoring the descent of the Holy Spirit upon the apostles and celebrated in the Orthodox Church on the 50th day after Easter). Voronov claims that this time falls in the driest month. Art researcher S. M. Chervonnaya attributes the action of the painting and the corresponding rite to Ivan Kupala Night (celebrated on 7 July / 24 June). Art historian G. P. Tuluzakova also notes that the event depicted in the painting relates to all-Russian village customs. She writes that among the Russian people the rite was part of many holidays. Among them: Bright Week of Easter (seven days including Easter Sunday and the six following days), Peter's Day (12 July / 29 June), and especially Ivan Kupala Night. On such days village boys poured water on everyone who passed by, and even dragged girls out of houses if they hid. After that, the girls joined the boys and participated in pouring themselves. It all ended with joint bathing. In this village custom, Christian "washing away sins" merged with memories of sacrifices by pouring to pagan idols and with calling rain to avoid drought.

Dmitry Seryakov considers Pouring as Fechin's continuation of the ethnographic theme already reflected in such paintings as Bearing Away the Bride and Kapustnitsa. He believes these three paintings could be called "ritualistic". In his opinion, Fechin sought in them not simply to demonstrate scenes of folk life.

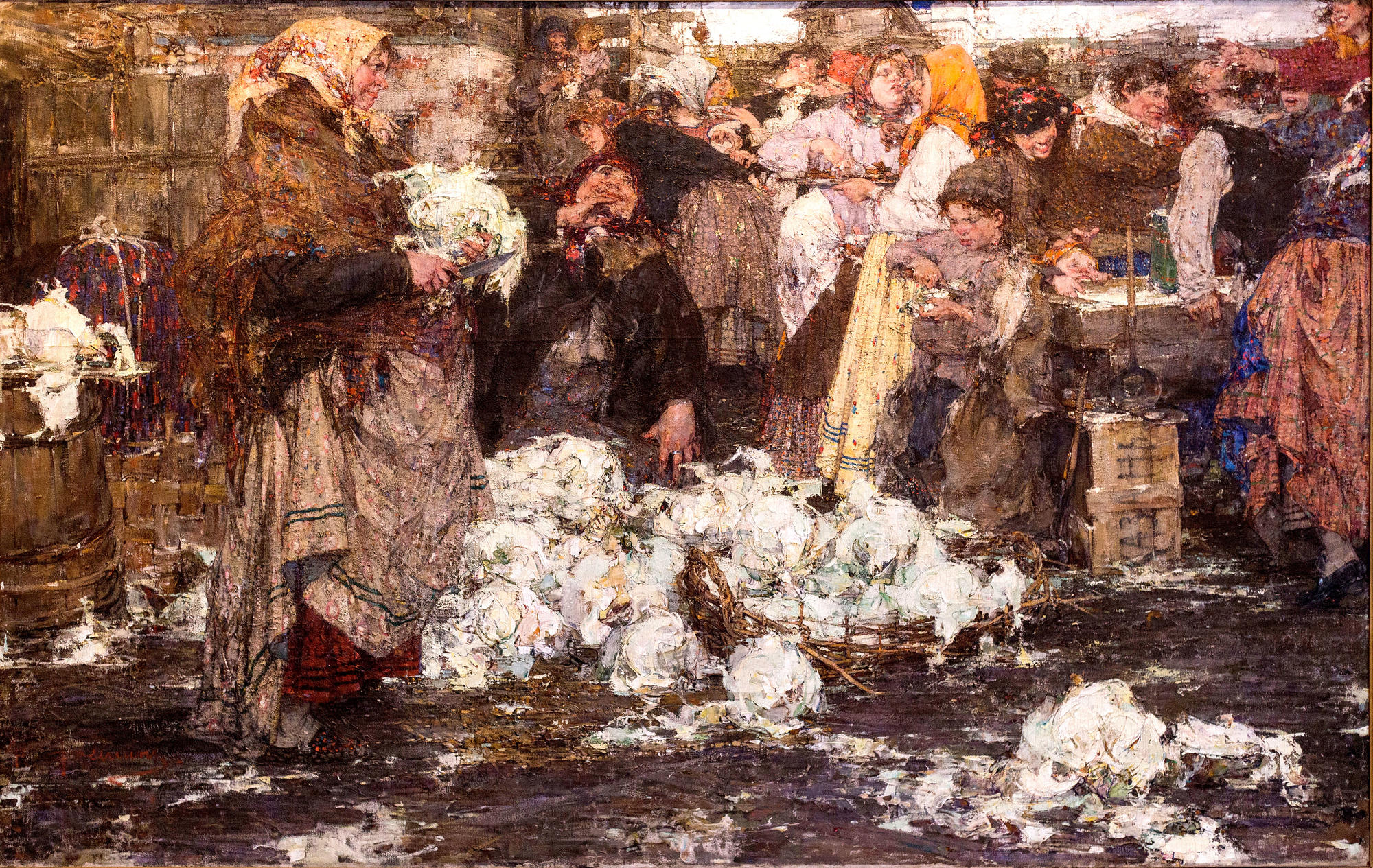
Nicolai Fechin. Kapustnitsa,1909 — a competition (diploma) work by N. I. Fechin. St. Petersburg, Museum of the Academy of Arts

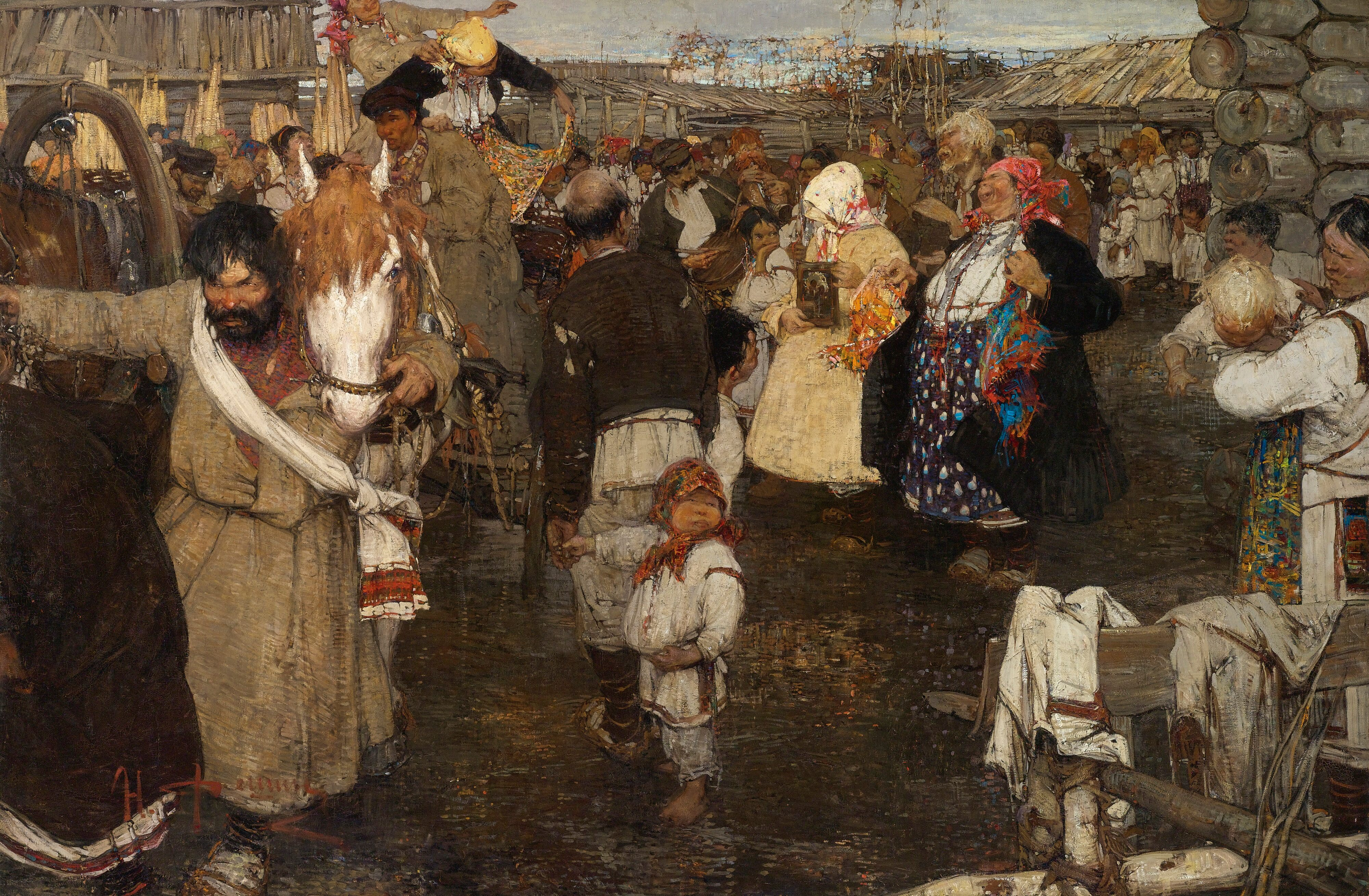
Nicolai Fechin. Bearing Away the Bride, 1908. USA, private collection

=== Working process ===
In Nadezhdino, Fechin painted several studies that later served as the basis for the painting Pouring. According to Dmitry Seryakov, by this time Fechin had already decided on the composition of the canvas and was thus searching for vivid character types, expressive poses for his future heroes, and their gestures. These studies are currently held, like the painting itself, in the collection of the State Museum of Fine Arts of the Republic of Tatarstan. Three of the studies depict characters from the future canvas: a woman in a red headscarf, a shivering girl, and a woman with a carrying pole. All three characters entered the final composition of the painting with minimal changes. In Seryakov's opinion, the main pictorial tasks of the future painting can already be seen in the studies. They are dominated by a common color scheme: ochre and warm green tones prevail in the conventional background, barely sketched with broad brushstrokes. Against this background, the red and lilac sarafans and white shirts of the heroes stand out.

Dmitry Seryakov notes that finding models from life for his canvases was extremely important to Fechin. In his view, the use of life studies is a key feature of the artist's painting, giving his canvases a "special vital plausibility". While working on the painting Pouring, Fechin painted from life not only the figures, character types, and costumes. He also searched for and sketched objects of everyday peasant life, which he later placed in the composition of the canvas.

Fechin did not finish the painting. Seryakov considers the question of the reasons for the artist's abandonment of completing the canvas to remain open. Among his hypotheses:

- Fechin may have become disappointed with the artistic features of the work nearing completion, as they seemed insufficiently expressive to him;
- he may have lost interest in the chosen theme.

At the same time, from the point of view of the Russian art historian, the canvas — even in its unfinished state — has great significance: it demonstrates the peculiarities of Fechin's work "at an intermediate stage of the process" of creating the painting.

== The painting and preparatory works in the museum collection ==
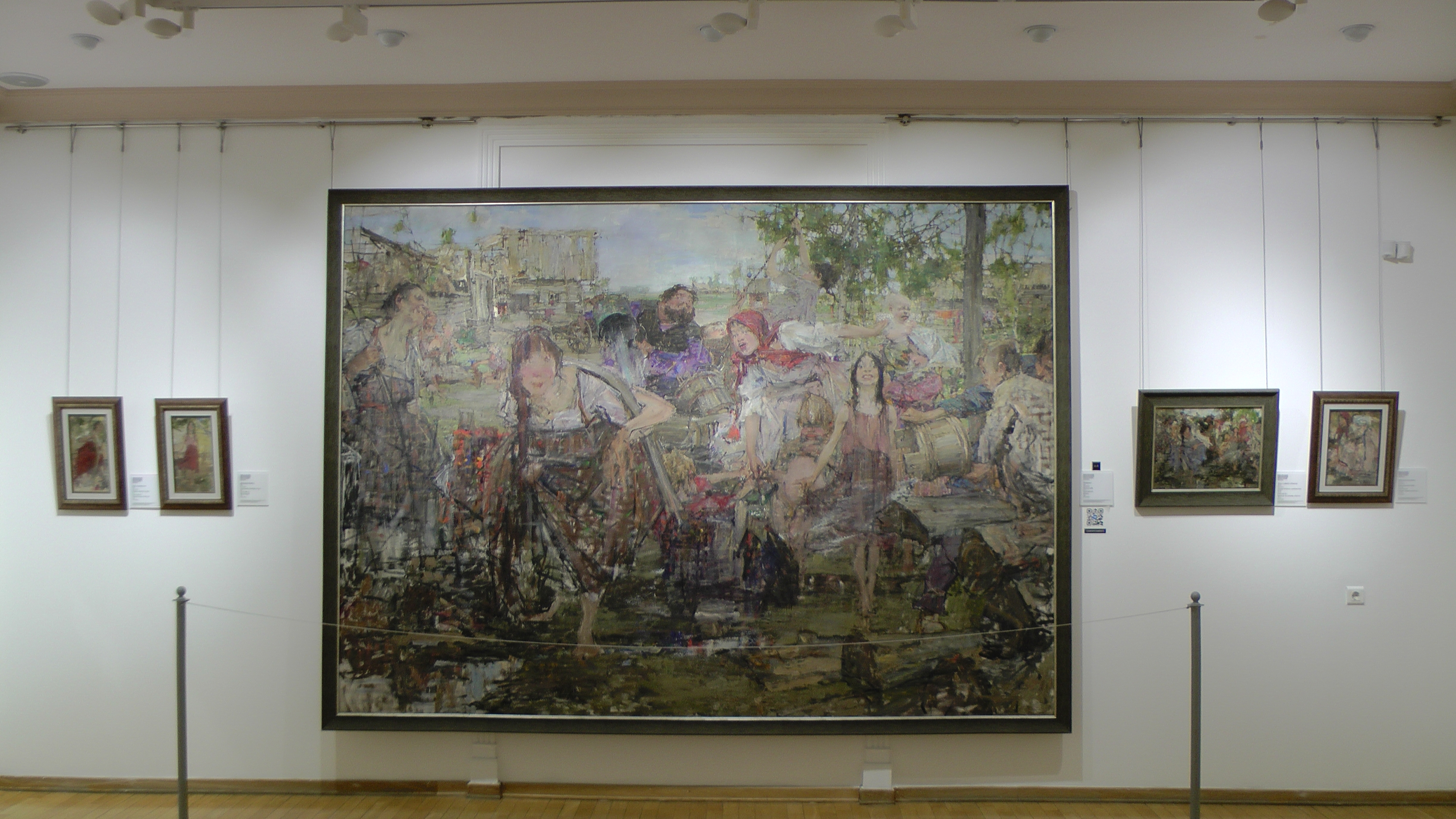
The painting Pouring on permanent display in the National Art Gallery "Khazine" hall, surrounded by studies. 2020 photo.

External images
- Studies and sketch for the painting
- Study "Boy from behind", between 1911 and 1914 (?).
- Study "Woman in red headscarf", between 1911 and 1914 (?).
- Study "Shivering girl", 1914.
- Study "Woman with yoke", 1914.

The painting Pouring became a part of the State Museum of Fine Arts of the Tatar ASSR in 1962. Previously, it was in the State Museum of the Tatar ASSR (from 1944). Before that, in the Central Museum of the Tatar ASSR from 1923 (the painting was deposited by the artist for storage upon his departure from the USSR abroad; Fechin never returned from his trip to his homeland). The technique is oil on canvas, dimensions 236 cm × 329 cm (93 in × 130 in), inventory number in the museum collection — Zh-630. Pouring is currently exhibited in the Nicolai Fechin Hall at the National Art Gallery "Khazine", a branch of the museum.

The painting has appeared multiple times in exhibitions in Kazan: in 1963, 1976, 1981–1982, and 1991.

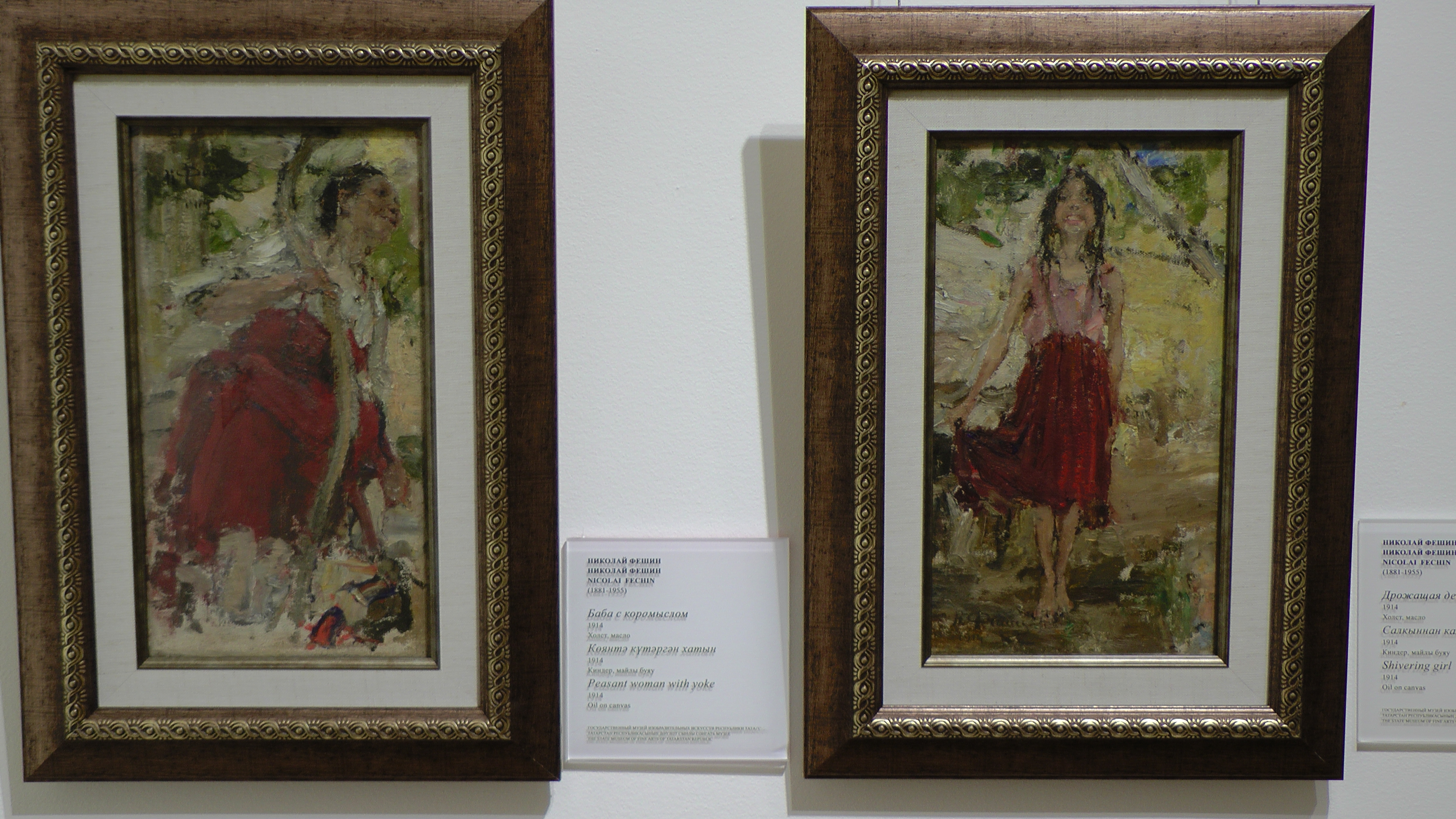
Studies for the painting Pouring in the "Khazine" gallery exhibition. 2020 photo.

Seryakov mentions that the same museum holds three studies for the painting and a sketch. The study Woman in red headscarf was painted between 1911 and 1914 (?). Technique: oil on canvas, size 33.5 cm × 25 cm (13.2 in × 9.8 in). It entered the collection in 1962 from the State Museum of the Tatar ASSR, previously belonging to the Ministry of Culture of the RSFSR (from 1961). Before that, it was in the private collection of A. A. Zaitsev, in the settlement of Valentinovka, Shchyolkovsky District, Moscow Oblast. Inventory number — Zh-1502. This study was exhibited in Kazan in 1963, 1981, and 1991. The study A woman with a carrying pole (1914) is also oil on canvas, size 35.5 cm × 19 cm (14.0 in × 7.5 in). At the upper left is the artist's signature and date — N. Fechin 1914; entered in 1962 from the State Museum of the Tatar ASSR, previously held by the Ministry of Culture of the RSFSR (from 1961), and before that in A. A. Zaitsev's collection. Inventory number — Zh-1504. Exhibited in Kazan in 1963, 1981, and 1991. The study Shivering girl was created in 1914, same technique, size 35 cm × 20 cm (13.8 in × 7.9 in). Lower left has the signature and date N. Fechin 1914. Entered 1962 from the State Museum of the Tatar ASSR, previously Ministry of Culture of the RSFSR from 1961, also from A. A. Zaitsev. Inventory number — Zh-1501. Also exhibited in Kazan in 1963, 1981, and 1991.

Galina Tuluzakova attributes the following preparatory works to this painting, also held in the State Museum of Fine Arts of the Republic of Tatarstan:

- Study Boy with bucket (between 1911 and 1914 (?), canvas, oil, 16.5 cm × 23 cm (6.5 in × 9.1 in), entered 1962 from the State Museum of the Tatar ASSR, previously in Ministry of Culture of the RSFSR from 1961, acquired from A. A. Zaitsev, Zh-1263). Exhibited in Kazan in 1963, 1981, and 1991.
- Study Boy with bare stomach (between 1911 and 1914 (?), same technique, 23 cm × 16 cm (9.1 in × 6.3 in), entered 1962 from the State Museum of the Tatar ASSR, previously Ministry of Culture of the RSFSR from 1961, from A. A. Zaitsev, Zh-1503). Exhibited in Kazan in 1963, 1981, and 1991.
- Study Boy from behind (between 1911 and 1914 (?), canvas on cardboard, oil, 25.5 cm × 19.7 cm (10.0 in × 7.8 in), entered 1972 (Note: The earlier 1992 catalog gives 1962, possibly erroneously by analogy with the previous two studies. Other parts of the book also contain typos.) from A. S. Timofeeva, previously in the private collection of V. K. Timofeev, Kazan, Zh-14-81). Exhibited in Kazan in 1963, 1981, and 1991.

The Fechin exhibition catalog also mentions as studies for Pouring:

- Study Boy's head (between 1911 and 1914 (?), canvas, oil, 20 cm × 13.5 cm (7.9 in × 5.3 in), entered 1962 from the State Museum of the Tatar ASSR, previously Ministry of Culture of the RSFSR from 1961, from A. A. Zaitsev, Zh-1263). Exhibited in Kazan in 1963, 1981, and 1991.
- Study Boy squatting by a wooden tub (between 1911 and 1914, same technique, 25.5 cm × 19.6 cm (10.0 in × 7.7 in), entered 1962 from the State Museum of the Tatar ASSR, previously Ministry of Culture of the RSFSR from 1961, from A. A. Zaitsev, Zh-1263).

The 1992 catalog mentions:

- Study for the painting Pouring (between 1911 and 1914, canvas on cardboard, oil, 25.5 cm × 19.6 cm (10.0 in × 7.7 in), inventory number "Zh-1144". Entered 1972 from A. S. Timofeeva. Exhibited in Kazan in 1981 and 1991.

The sketch for the painting Pouring was made between 1911 and 1914. Technique: oil on canvas, size 38 cm × 50.5 cm (15.0 in × 19.9 in). Entered 1962 from the State Museum of the Tatar ASSR. Inventory number — Zh-1209. The sketch was shown at Fechin exhibitions in Kazan in 1963 and 1981, at exhibitions in Russian cities in 1992, and at the "Art-Divage" gallery (Moscow) in 2004. It was restored at the I. E. Grabar All-Russian Art Scientific Restoration Center.

Galina Tuluzakova also mentions in her dissertation a Sketch for 'Pouring' (1911, charcoal on paper), noting that its whereabouts were unknown as of 1998. She names another study for the canvas Pouring, Girl's head, in her 2009 book Nicolai Fechin. Life Drawing. It is made with pencil on paper, size 31 cm × 43 cm (12 in × 17 in). Tuluzakova attributes this study to the State Museum of Fine Arts of the Republic of Tatarstan collection, but it is not mentioned in the museum catalogs of 1992 and 2006.

== Critics ==
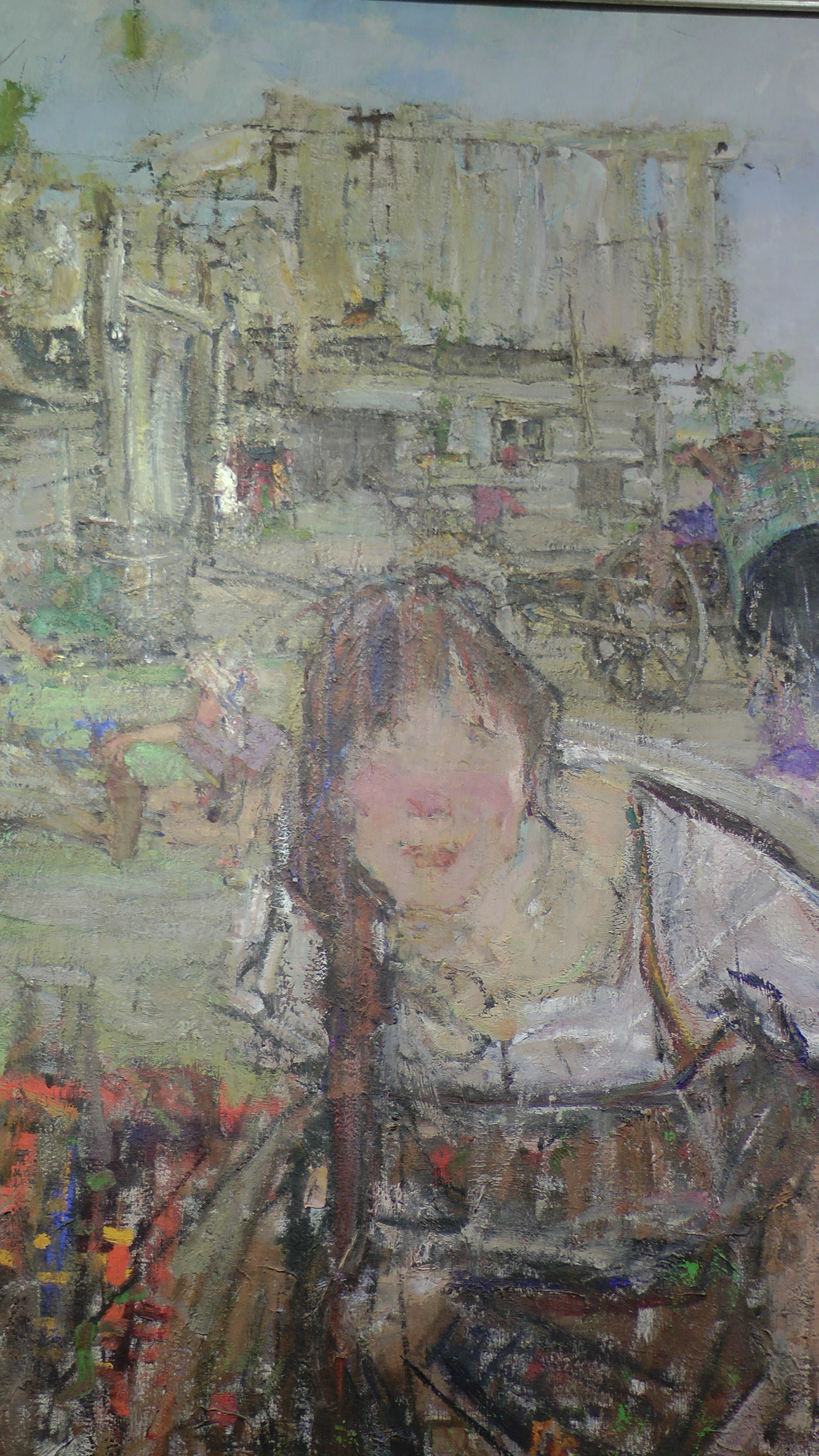
Pouring. Fragment

=== Contemporaries on the painting ===
D. I. Ryazanskaya, who studied in 1918–1920 in the studio of N. M. Sapozhnikova, where Nicolai Fechin gave classes, saw the painting Pouring and shared her impressions of it:

In the third year he assigned us a composition on the theme of 'Odysseus's return to Penelope'. In general, at that time there were somehow no composition assignments, and this was a major gap in the artistic education of young people. In the studio where we used to study, two of his works stood facing the wall: Slaughterhouse and Pouring. In the Nicolai Ivanovich's absence, we would often turn the paintings away from the wall and examine them, marvelling at and studying the technique of his work.

=== Soviet art critics ===
According to Soviet art critic V. Voronov, the painting Pouring acquaints the viewer with the world, rituals, joys, and difficult life of a pre-revolutionary Russian village. The painting impresses with its natural composition; it is full of movement, shouting, laughter, squealing, and the sound of water. At the same time, Voronov notes that the viewer is left with a strange feeling: the painting depicts a cheerful scene from village life, yet it carries a sense of the wretchedness of that life. Voronov emphasises that critics contemporary with Fechin also saw in the artist's early canvases "the truth about the Russian village of the time". Art critic A. B. Fainberg, in his book Artists of Tataria, wrote that the painting Pouring is a picture of popular life.

Researcher S. G. Kaplanova notes the contradiction between Fechin's use of grotesque and documentary quality in the painting — a quality which, in her opinion, is associated with an excessive straightforwardness of impressions from life. From her point of view, Pouring and other paintings by the artist created at the same time lack the generalisation that results from the synthesis of observations from life. She considers this trait to be most characteristic of Nicolai Fechin's unfinished paintings.

=== Russian art critics ===
A. I. Novitsky, in his article The Varenka's Return, writes that Pouring is not a Peredvizhniki-style painting in spirit — it is written from the perspective of "painterly ethnographism". He admires the artist's mastery but noted the beast-like faces of the peasants and the dullness of the women's physiognomies, the "hideously bloated figures" depicted on the canvas. In his opinion, Fechin was indifferent to his characters. (Tuluzakova, however, considers this to be evidence not of the artist's indifference but of a concept in which the "sharpening of the characteristic" was necessary to express the idea that possessed the artist's consciousness.) Art historian Aida Almazova notes the infectious gaiety reigning in the painting, the emotionality, resonance, and dynamism of the canvas. She writes of the impression made on viewers by the flying droplets of water and the wet linen clinging to the bodies of the painting's heroines. On the one hand, Fechin acts as a successor to the traditions of the Peredvizhniki, and on the other as one of the first representatives of the Art Nouveau style in Russia. At the same time, the painting contains "a certain wild primordialism characteristic of the provincial heartland".

=== Dmitry Seryakov on the painting ===
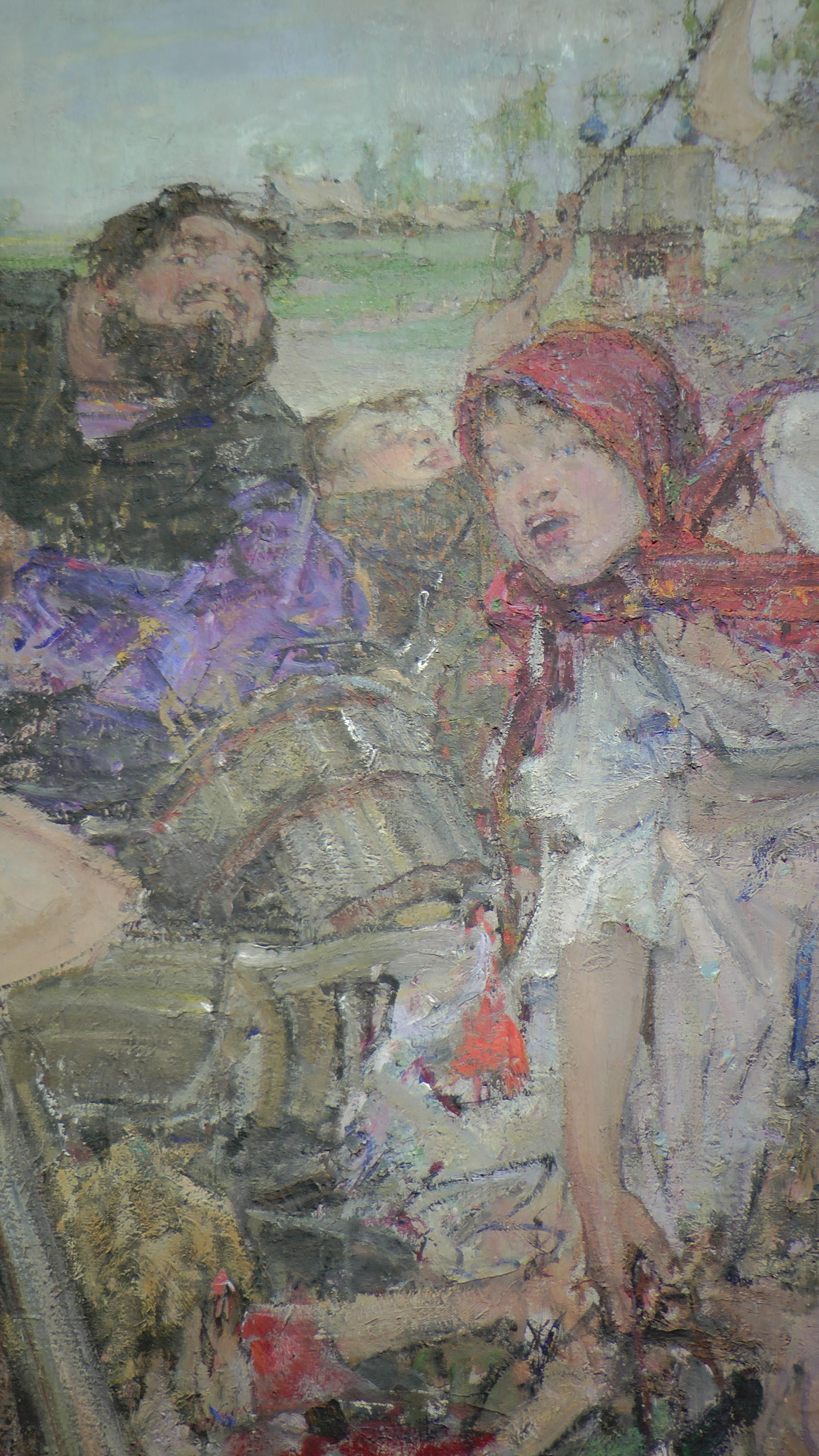
Pouring. Fragment

In Dmitry Seryakov's opinion, the painting derives particular expressiveness from its unconventional characters, each of whom is depicted by the artist as a vivid individual. These are people of different ages, shown in contrasting emotional states. A central character, from Seryakov's point of view, is absent. The compositional and painterly centres of the painting are weakly defined. The figures are independent and self-sufficient; in Seryakov's words, they "seem to pose separately for the viewer".

According to Seryakov, Fechin did not complete the painting Pouring; but despite this, it reflects the artistic principles characteristic of its author. The compositional features of this canvas are the same as in his other genre works: figures crowd the canvas, some of them even cut off by the edges of the painting. This causes the viewer to perceive the painting as a scene "cut from life". The landscape plays a secondary role on the canvas — it merely frames the everyday scene and lends it compositional integrity. The artist employed such a perspective that the action unfolds for the viewer predominantly against the background of the ground. It is the ground itself that occupies the greater part of the canvas. The horizon is positioned fairly high, so that the narrow strip of sky in the background — along with the buildings and vegetation silhouetted against it — almost abuts the upper edge of the painting. Some fragments of the painting (for example, faces) are rendered in meticulous detail by the artist, while other elements are generalised or left so unfinished that, in Seryakov's words, "at first it is even difficult to understand what the artist intended to depict here".

For Seryakov, Fechin employed the non-finito method in working on the painting. The expressiveness of the artistic image was created not through "mutually complementary harmonisation of all components" but through the maximal revelation of a significant fragment. In working on genre pieces, Fechin would temper this aspect at the final stage. Pouring, which remained unfinished, never reached that stage. Seryakov insists that this canvas allows one to see the distinction that existed in Fechin's conception "between a genuinely unfinished work — underdeveloped, not yet ripe — and a work executed in the non-finito manner". In addition to its fragmentary quality, the painting is distinguished by the spontaneity of its execution. The dynamics of the brushstrokes are preserved; graphic flourishes merely sketch the silhouettes of forms. In the sketch-like looseness, Seryakov believed, the creative process manifests itself. Fechin ceased work on the painting when the local colour masses had already been established and the more careful modelling of the figures had begun. In places, brushstrokes sketching out forms are visible, and in some areas the canvas is left unpainted. Fechin employed the Impressionist technique of optical mixing when he emphasised the drawing with ultramarine, lending vibrancy to the adjacent colours. The seemingly chaotic brushstrokes coalesce into specific images when viewed from a considerable distance.

After establishing the large background areas and colour relationships, Fechin proceeded to work up the faces and figures. This occurred when a significant portion of the canvas was still unpainted: the compositional construction lines are visible, and "in places there is no colour specificity". Finished fragments exist on the canvas alongside elements still at an early stage of graphic construction. In Seryakov's opinion, Fechin did not proceed from a general image to particular details but assembled the composition around semantic focal points. These focal points he first laid down, and then "drew in" all the remaining elements. At the same time, he worked across the entire canvas simultaneously: working up one fragment prompted corresponding shifts in the treatment of others.

=== Galina Tuluzakova on the painting ===
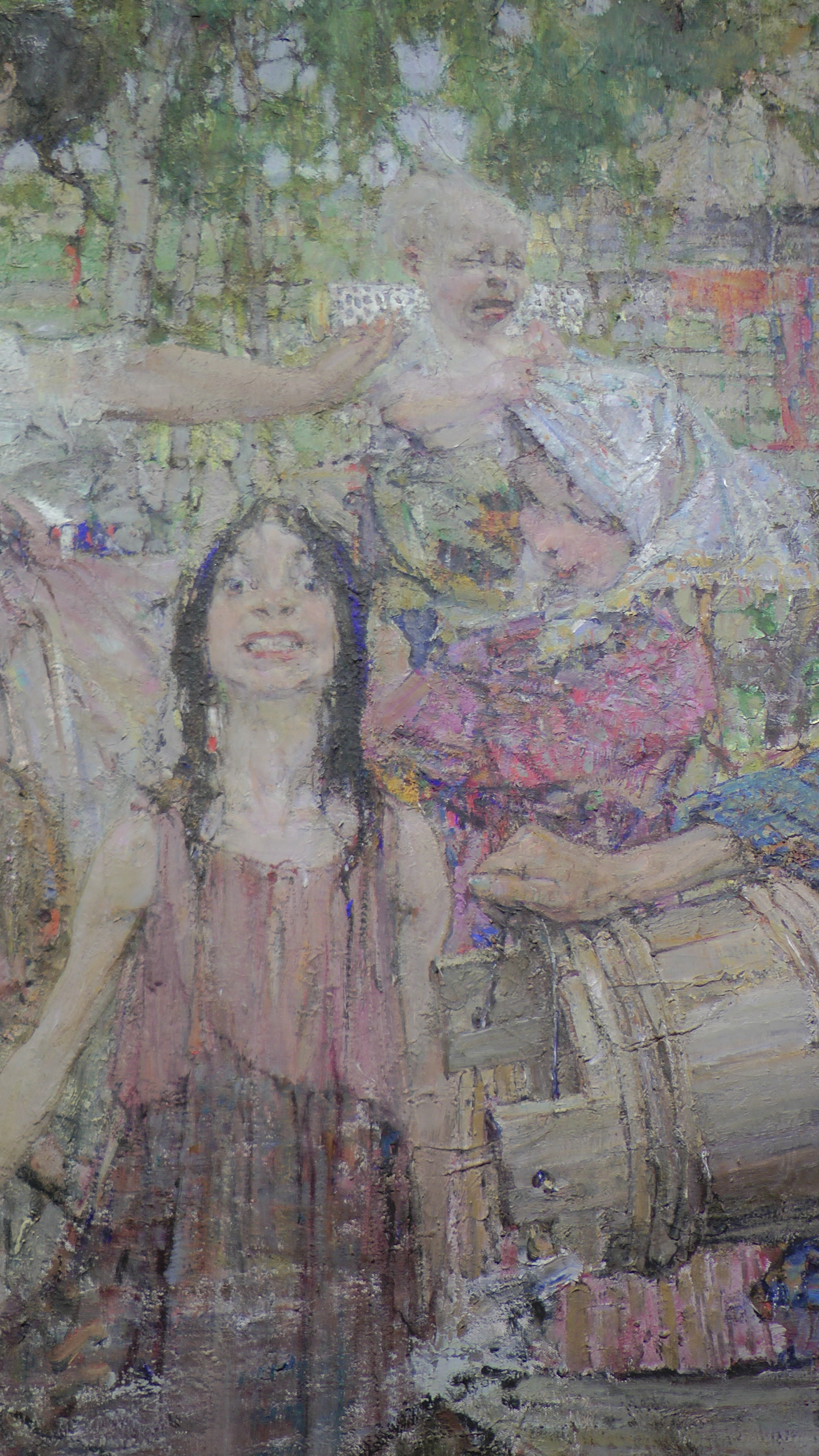
Pouring. Fragment

According to art historian G. P. Tuluzakova, the painting is "full of emotional expression and painterly mastery". She notes the dynamism of the subject, the vividly expressed grotesque in the treatment of the characters, their spontaneity and "sharpness of reactions" — the wide-eyed girl screams and shudders simultaneously. The emotionality of the painting is on the verge of a breaking point. Laughter, tears, and fright are present on the canvas simultaneously. The capturing of an unstable facial expression might lead to the impression of a "frozen mask", but the artist avoided such a danger by filling the canvas with inner movement. This gave rise to the effect of capturing an open emotion.

Tuluzakova attempts to reconstruct Fechin's process of working on the canvas. Initially, Fechin would find the point of intersection of the main vertical and horizontal lines. He would then mark the compositional nodes in charcoal. Having established the relationship between the darkest node and the lightest, he would begin work with colour. In G. P. Tuluzakova's opinion, at the painting's compositional foundation, lies an almost classical triangle, whose apex is the head of the peasant in a lilac shirt who is tipping over a bucket of water. It is positioned above the crowd and intersects with the light strip of sky, thereby attracting the viewer's attention. This technique was used by Fechin in many of his compositions. The heads of most of the figures are depicted close to a single line running parallel to the horizon, by which means the canvas is divided into two unequal parts. In his earlier painting Cabbage Harvest, Fechin employed a chiaroscuro contrast in which colour "intensified at the narrative nodes". In Pouring, he constructed the colour palette through a variety of "warm-cool oscillations across the spectrum from blue to red at roughly the same tonal level". Tuluzakova notes that warm and cool tones exist on the painting sometimes in nuanced and sometimes in contrasting relations. This creates in the viewer a sensation of freshness. The palette, however, is in her view rather sparse and is built on closely related tones. At the centre is a contrast of dark and light, as well as a triad of colours — blue, yellow, and red. These are combined with one another repeatedly; the combination grows more complex as the colours dissolve into one another, producing a vibration of colour.

The painting's "blurredness" and "distortion" through brushwork cannot be reduced solely to the unfinished state of the painting. From Tuluzakova's perspective, Fechin was searching for ways to convey the heightened emotional state of his characters. This was demanded by the very subject matter — on a warm summer day, girls are drenched from head to foot with icy well water. The impression of incompleteness is associated with the figure of the woman in the foreground, who falls out of focus, while the faces of the characters in the distant planes are depicted with extreme clarity. Fechin worked in the technique of alla prima, creating the illusion of an attempt to complete the image before the paint had fully dried. Detailed rendering of the woman's face might have drawn too much attention to her, and the "legibility" and "completeness" of the painting would have destroyed its painterly fabric. For this reason Fechin rendered details only to the extent necessary for the realisation of his primary intention. The tub from which the girl in the red dress is being doused is carefully worked up by the artist. To distinguish the relationship between the deliberately unfinished and the accidental as applied to Pouring is, in Tuluzakova's opinion, difficult, but in any case the incompleteness lends particular qualities to this work.

=== Sergei Voronkov on the painting ===
Unlike Tuluzakova, the artist and art critic S. N. Voronkov considers that all the figures, except for the elderly woman standing to the left, are united by a curved line. The brushwork imparts sharpness and tension to the painting. The figures exist in a complex interweaving of colour areas and long brushstrokes, which Fechin, in Voronkov's view, may have applied with a semi-dry brush. The outlines of the figures sometimes break off, dissolving into the space of the canvas.

Voronkov considers that for Fechin, "finish" — as prized by the Peredvizhniki — was in general "not a criterion of creativity". Pouring, according to him, reveals the "inner workings" of the painter's approach to his canvases. He consciously omits many details. For instance, Fechin did not finish the figure of the woman with a yoke on the left in order to redirect the viewer's attention to the girl in the pink dress. This childhood image "lives in the painting like a living being". The girl's face expresses simultaneously fright and bliss at the situation in which she finds herself. The child's gaze is directed at the viewer, and the slender little figure is set off by the background. The objects surrounding her — the white dress and headscarf of the peasant women, the wooden tub in the boy's hands with the stream of water splashing from it — create, in Voronkov's view, a bright aureole around the village girl. She herself becomes the compositional centre, and everything else in the painting is regarded by the artist, from the art critic's standpoint, as accessories that complement it. Voronkov maintained that the artist deliberately left the painting at this stage of completion in order to sustain and reinforce the significance of this narrative centre.

Voronkov also considers that the figure of the black-bearded peasant at the centre of the group plays a significant role. Fechin underscored its importance with the light background of the sky. This figure "holds the entire composition together, like the keystone in an arch, and at the same time tonally balances the entire composition". The tree trunk on the right closes off the painting.

== Bibliography ==
=== Sources ===
- Ryazanskaya, D. I. (1975). "Воспоминания о Н. И. Фешине" [Memories of N. I. Fechin]. In Compiled and annotated by G. Mogilnikova (ed.). Николай Иванович Фешин. Документы, письма, воспоминания о художнике [Nikolai Ivanovich Feshin: Documents, Letters, Memoirs about the Artist] (collected volume) (in Russian). Leningrad: Khudozhnik RSFSR. pp. 134–140.

=== Scholarly and popular literature ===
- Almazova, A. A. (2013). "Изобразительное искусство в двадцатом столетии" [Fine Art in the Twentieth Century]. Художественная культура Татарстана в контексте социальных процессов и духовных традиций: очерки [Artistic Culture of Tatarstan in the Context of Social Processes and Spiritual Traditions: Essays] (in Russian). Kazan: Kazan University. pp. 209–233.
- Voronkov, S. N. (1999). К вопросу о творчестве Николая Фешина. Дипломная работа, перераб. и исправл [On the Question of Nikolai Feshin's Work: Diploma Thesis, Revised and Corrected] (PDF) (in Russian). Saint Petersburg: Saint Petersburg Academic Institute of Painting, Sculpture and Architecture named after I. E. Repin. p. 125. Archived from the original (PDF) on 2019-01-21.
- Voronov, Vl. (1964). "Судьба Николая Фешина" [The Destiny of Nikolai Feshin]. Ogonyok (magazine) (in Russian) (29 (1925)): 16–17.
- Klyuchevskaya, E. P. (1992). "[Николай Иванович Фешин]" [[Nicolai Ivanovich Fechin]]. Каталог произведений Н. И. Фешина до 1923 г. [Catalogue of Works by N. I. Fechin before 1923] (in Russian). Kazan: State Museum of Fine Arts of the Republic of Tatarstan; Tatar Newspaper and Magazine Publishing House. pp. 7–16.
- Kaplanova, S. G. (1975). "Творческий путь Н. И. Фешина" [The Creative Path of N. I. Fechin]. In Compiled and annotated by G. Mogilnikova (ed.). Николай Иванович Фешин. Документы, письма, воспоминания о художнике: сб [Nikolai Ivanovich Feshin: Documents, Letters, Memoirs about the Artist] (collected volume) (in Russian). Leningrad: Khudozhnik RSFSR. pp. 7–20.
- Klyuchevskaya, E. P.; Tsoy, V. A. (1992). "[Николай Иванович Фешин]" [[Nicolai Ivanovich Fechin]]. Каталог произведений Н. И. Фешина до 1923 г. [Catalogue of Works by N. I. Fechin before 1923] (in Russian). Kazan: State Museum of Fine Arts of the Republic of Tatarstan; Tatar Newspaper and Magazine Publishing House. pp. 33–51.
- Verbina, O. G.; Ulyomnova, O. L. (2004). "Catalogue of the Exhibition of Painting and Drawing". Каталог выставки живописи и рисунка // Николай Фешин. 1881 / 1955. Живопись. Рисунок. Из собрания Государственного музея изобразительных искусств Республики Татарстан и частных коллекций. Москва, галерея «Арт-Диваж» [Nicolai Fechin. 1881/1955. Painting. Drawing. From the Collection of the State Museum of Fine Arts of the Republic of Tatarstan and Private Collections. Moscow, Art-Divazh Gallery] (catalogue) (in Russian). Introductory articles by I. I. Galeev, G. P. Tuluzakova, A. E. Kuznetsov. Moscow: Skorpion. p. 24.
- Klyuchevskaya, E. P.; Tsoy, V. A. (2006). Николай Фешин. Каталог выставки произведений Н. И. Фешина в Государственном музее изобразительных искусств Республики Татарстан 22 ноября 2006 — 20 января 2007. Живопись. Графика. Скульптура. Декоративно-прикладное искусство [Nicolai Fechin: Catalogue of the Exhibition of Works by N. I. Fechin at the State Museum of Fine Arts of the Republic of Tatarstan, 22 November 2006 – 20 January 2007. Painting. Graphic Art. Sculpture. Decorative and Applied Art] (in Russian). Kazan: Zaman. p. 112. ISBN 5-89052-036-9.
- Novitsky, A. I. (1994). "Возвращение Вареньки" [The Return of Varenka]. Kazan (magazine) (in Russian) (9–10): 156–160.
- Seryakov, D. G. (2009). "III. 2. «Нон-финито» в портрете" [III.2. "Non Finito" in the Portrait]. Проблемы «нон-финито» в творчестве Николая Ивановича Фешина : диссертация на соискание учёной степени кандидата искусствоведения [Problems of "Non Finito" in the Work of Nikolai Ivanovich Feshin] (dissertation for the degree of Candidate of Art History) (in Russian). Moscow: Research Institute of Theory and History of Fine Arts of the Russian Academy of Arts.
- Tuluzakova, G. P. (2015). "Николай Фешин: Казань – Таос. К 1000-летию Казани" [Nicolai Fechin: Kazan – Taos. For the 1000th Anniversary of Kazan]. Tretyakov Gallery (magazine) (in Russian) (Special Issue 1: Russia – America: At the Crossroads of Cultures): 13–18.
- Tuluzakova, G. P. (2007). Николай Фешин: Альбом [Nikolai Feshin: Album]. Russian Artists. 20th Century (in Russian). Saint Petersburg: Zolotoi Vek. p. 480. ISBN 978-5-342-00105-2.
- Tuluzakova, G. P. (2005). "Николай Фешин: Казань – Санта-Фе. К 1000-летию Казани" [Nicolai Fechin: Kazan – Santa Fe. For the 1000th Anniversary of Kazan] (PDF). Tretyakov Gallery (magazine) (in Russian) (2): 14–21.
- Tuluzakova, G. P. (2012). "Альманах Государственного Русского музея" [Nicolai Fechin in Russia]. Almanac of the State Russian Museum (in Russian) (343: Nicolai Fechin): 9–18. ISBN 978-5-93332-406-5.
- Tuluzakova, G. P. (1998). Эволюция творчества Н. И. Фешина, 1881—1955 гг.: Основные проблемы : диссертация на соискание учёной степени кандидата искусствоведения [The Evolution of N. I. Fechin’s Artistic Work, 1881–1955: Key Issues: Dissertation for the Degree of Candidate of Art History] (dissertation for the degree of Candidate of Art History) (in Russian). Saint Petersburg: Saint Petersburg State Academic Institute of Painting, Sculpture and Architecture named after I. E. Repin at the Russian Academy of Arts. 221 pp.
- Tuluzakova, G. P. (2009). Николай Фешин. Натурный рисунок [Nicolai Fechin: Life Drawing] (in Russian). Informa. 162 pp. ISBN 5-903176-06-2.
- Fainberg, A. B. (1983). Художники Татарии [Artists of Tataria] (in Russian). Leningrad: Khudozhnik RSFSR. p. 232.
- Chervonnaya, S. M. (1987). Искусство Татарии: история изобразительного искусства и архитектуры с древнейших времен до 1917 года [Art of Tataria: A History of Fine Art and Architecture from Ancient Times to 1917] (in Russian). Moscow: Iskusstvo. p. 351.
