= Nicolai Fechin =

Russian and American painter (1881–1955)

- Self-portrait
- Born: Nikolai Ivanovich Feshin; December 8, 1881; Kazan, Russian Empire
- Died: October 5, 1955 (aged 73); Santa Monica, California, U.S.
- Resting place: Arskoe Cemetery, Kazan
- Education: Imperial Academy of Arts; Kazan Art School
- Known for: Painting
- Spouse: Alexandra Belkovitch (m. 1911; div. 1933)
- Children: Eya Fechin
- Patrons: William S. Stimmel

Nikolai Ivanovich Feshin, (Note: Russian: Никола́й Ива́нович Фе́шин.) better known in English as Nicolai Fechin (8 December [O.S. 26 November] 1881 – 5 October 1955), was a Russian and American painter known for his portraits and works featuring Native Americans. After graduating with the highest marks from the Imperial Academy of Arts and traveling in Europe under a Prix de Rome, he returned to his native Kazan, where he taught and painted. He exhibited his first work in the United States in 1910 in an international exhibition in Pittsburgh, Pennsylvania. After immigrating with his family to New York in 1923 and working there for a few years, Fechin developed tuberculosis and moved West for a drier climate. He and his family settled in Taos, New Mexico, where he became fascinated by Native Americans and the landscape. The adobe house which he renovated in Taos is listed on the National Register of Historic Places and houses the Taos Art Museum. After leaving Taos in 1933, Fechin eventually settled in southern California.

== Birth and early life ==
Nicolai Fechin was born in 1881 in Kazan, Russia. As a child, he almost died from meningitis. His father was a woodcarver and gilder, and he learned carving from him. By age eleven, Fechin was drawing designs for his father to use in the construction of altars. At the age of 13, he enrolled in the newly established Kazan Art School, a branch of the Imperial Academy of Arts in the capital of St. Petersburg.

Based on his work, Fechin was admitted for further study to the Imperial Academy of Arts in Saint-Petersburg, where he studied with Ilya Repin and Filipp Malyavin. During the summer of 1904 he had an influential trip to Siberia, where he was fascinated by the landscape and native peoples. When he returned to Kazan, he often traveled outside the city to capture the rural people and places.

In 1909 Fechin graduated with the highest grade possible, and his final competitive canvas won him the Prix de Rome. The traveling scholarship allowed him to visit and study in the artistic capitals of Europe in 1909. The following year he won a gold medal at the annual International Exhibition in Munich. Fechin was invited to show his work at an international exhibition at the Carnegie Institute in Pittsburgh, Pennsylvania in 1910. He began to sell his work in the United States that year through W.S. Stimmel, a patron in New York.

== Pedagogy and career in Russia ==
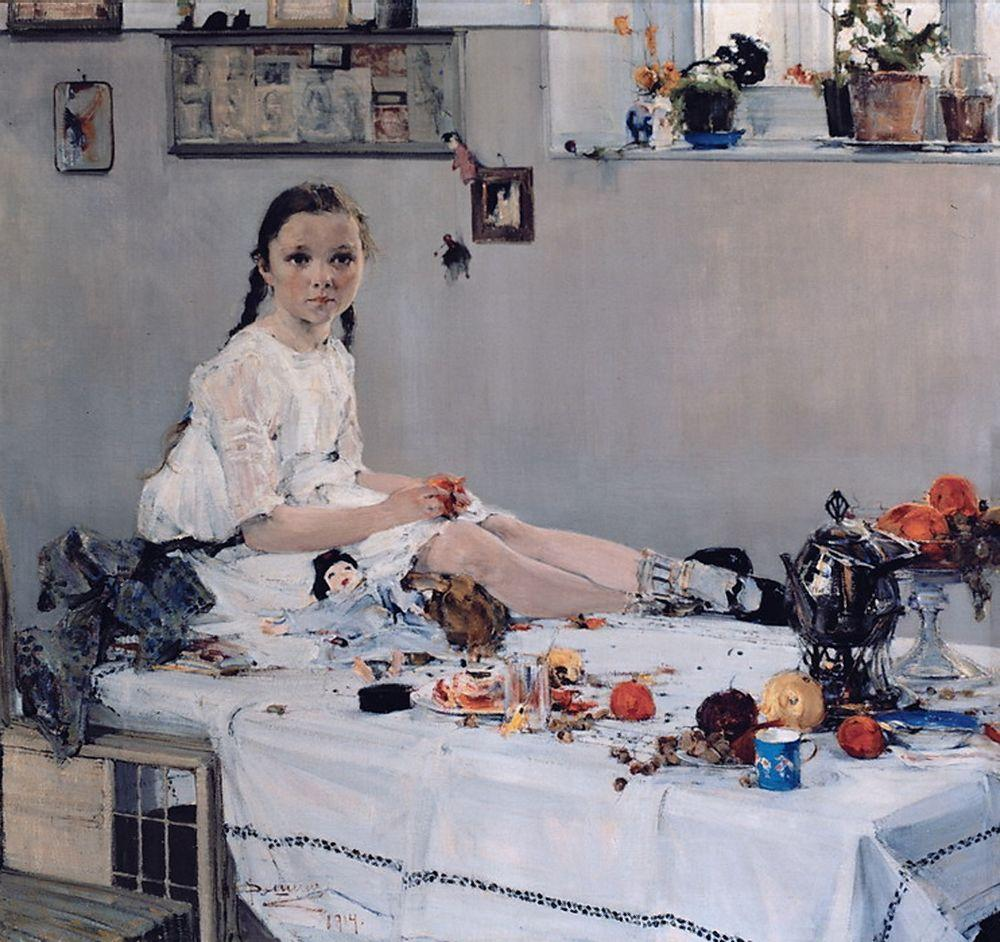
Portrait of Varya Adoratskaya (1914), State Art Museum of Tatarstan, Kazan

When Fechin returned from traveling, he resumed teaching at Kazan, where he taught for ten years. He was a popular instructor. He had a less demanding style of lessons than the gruelling exercises he had been forced to complete at the Imperial Academy. Among his students was Konstantin Chebotaryov.

In 1910 Fechin was among the founders of the Commune of Artists. He exhibited with the Itinerants from 1912 to 1922 and with the Association of Artists of Revolutionary Russia (AKhRR) from 1922 to 1926. In addition, he designed sets and other scenic elements for the theatre from 1920 to 1922.

== Marriage and family ==
In 1913, with his position at the school secure, Fechin married Alexandra Belkovitch (c. 1893–1983), the daughter of the director of the Kazan School of Art. They had a daughter, Eya (1914–2002). In 1933 they divorced and Eya lived with her father most of the time.

== United States ==
The social disruption and widespread deprivation after the Russian Revolution made life difficult, and Fechin's parents died of typhoid fever. During the Russian famine of 1921 he was rescued by the American Relief Administration. In 1923 Fechin and his family emigrated to the United States, where they settled in New York. He was already well known in the States from canvases at American and European exhibitions, as well as sales. His patrons Stimmel and Jack Hunter, also John Burnham, the notable architect and a major collector of his work, helped Fechin and his family leave Russia. He soon was commissioned for new portraits and started teaching at the New York Academy of Art. He exhibited at the National Academy of Design, where in 1924 he won the first prize; in 1926 he won a medal at the 1926 International Exposition in Philadelphia.

He became well known for his powerful portraits, which observers said seemed to radiate from the eyes of the subject. Some of his more renowned subjects are Frieda Lawrence, Douglas MacArthur, Anna May Wong, Ella Young, Willa Cather, Mabel Dodge Luhan, Rebecca Salsbury James, Ariadna Mikeshina, David Burliuk, Nikolai Evreinov, and Lillian Gish.

At an early age, Fechin had learned carving from his father. As an adult, he produced impressionistic sculpture, primarily from wood. At the Academy he had worked with other materials as well, but he was impatient about the processes of constructing armatures and going through seemingly endless casting cycles. He enjoyed the more direct creative process of working in wood.

=== Southwestern United States ===
While in New York, Fechin developed tuberculosis. Lacking effective antibiotics then, doctors recommended a drier climate for him. Fechin traveled west and in 1927 eventually settled with his family in Taos, New Mexico, which was developing as an arts center. The Taos mountains reminded him of the beauty he had seen in Siberia and he soon painted with fervor. He felt particularly close to the Native Americans, and many of his most acclaimed works done in the United States were of the Native Americans. Fechin had great affection for Taos and became a naturalized American citizen while living there.

The Fechins purchased a two-story adobe house, and spent several years enlarging and modifying it according to designs by Fechin. Changes included adding and enlarging windows, enlarging the porch and making the rooms more open. He also carved 51 intricate doors according to Russian style, created triptych windows, and carved furniture for use in the house, which reflects a combination of modernist, Russian and Native American sensibility.

A variety of Fechin's works in a range of genres can be seen at his former home, as part of the collection of the Taos Art Museum. Some of the personal spaces have also been preserved. In 1979 the building was listed on the National Register of Historic Places.

== Later life ==
Fechin stopped working on the house when he and his wife Alexandra divorced in 1933. She lived at the house until her death in 1983.

Fechin returned to New York with their daughter Eya for the winter, and she lived mostly with him until her own marriage. After New York, he traveled to Southern California, Mexico, Japan, and the Pacific Islands of Java and Bali. Soon he bought a spacious house in Hollywood, but in 1948 sold it and moved into a studio in Rustic Canyon in Santa Monica. There he taught small groups of students, painted, and entertained.

In 1955 he died in Santa Monica. In 1976 his daughter Eya took his remains back to Russia for reinterment at Arskoe Cemetery in Kazan. The Russian artist Sergei Bongart bought the Rustic Canyon studio where Fechin had lived and painted there until his own death later in 1985.

== Legacy and honors ==
Significant collections of Fechin's paintings and drawings are housed at the Stark Museum of Art and Frye Art Museum. Several items are held in the Smithsonian American Art Museum, the National Gallery of Art, the Art Institute of Chicago, the National Portrait Gallery, the De Young Museum, the Los Angeles County Museum of Art, the Eiteljorg Museum, the Gilcrease Museum, the Wichita Art Museum, the Harwood Museum of Art, the San Diego Museum of Art, the New Mexico Museum of Art, the American Museum of Western Art, as well as in the collections of Harvard University, the University of New Mexico, the University of Oklahoma, University of Nebraska and Baylor University. A number of artworks, along with his working table and easel, are on display at the National Cowboy & Western Heritage Museum. Other pieces are displayed in different countries, with the largest collection at the Fechin Center in Kazan, Russia. The Russian Museum and State Tretyakov Gallery also contain several works. Many of his paintings also remain in private hands.

In 1975 the artist/author Mary Balcomb wrote the book, Nicolai Fechin, now in its third printing. Other texts on the subject include Nicolai Fechin: The Art and the Life by Galina P. Tuluzakova, Fechin: The Builder by Eya Fechin, and The Genius of Nicolai Fechin: Recollections by Forrest Fenn. Fechin was also profiled in Of Time and Change by Frank Waters.

His former home in Taos has been adapted as the Taos Art Museum and a house museum, and in 1979 was listed on the National Register of Historic Places. His daughter Eya Fechin founded the Fechin Institute in Taos in his honor in 1981.

== See also ==
- Portrait of Jack Hunter (Nicolai Fechin)
- Bearing Away the Bride
- Pouring
