= Mary Shepard Greene =

American jewelry designer (1869–1958)

- Born: September 26, 1869; New York City, New York, United States
- Died: May 24, 1958 (aged 88); Santa Fe, New Mexico
- Education: Raphaël Collin
- Movement: Taos Society of Artists
- Spouse: Ernest L. Blumenschein

Mary Shepard Greene Blumenschein (1869–1958) was an American artist, illustrator and jewelry designer.

== Biography ==
Mary Shepard Greene was born in New York City, the second child of Rufus, a wealthy businessman from Providence, and Mary Isabel Shepard Greene. She studied at the Adelphi Academy in Brooklyn and then at the Pratt Institute.

== Career ==
When she was only 17 years of age, she left for Paris in 1886 where she worked with Raphaël Collin, an artist best known for establishing links with well-known artists working in Japan.

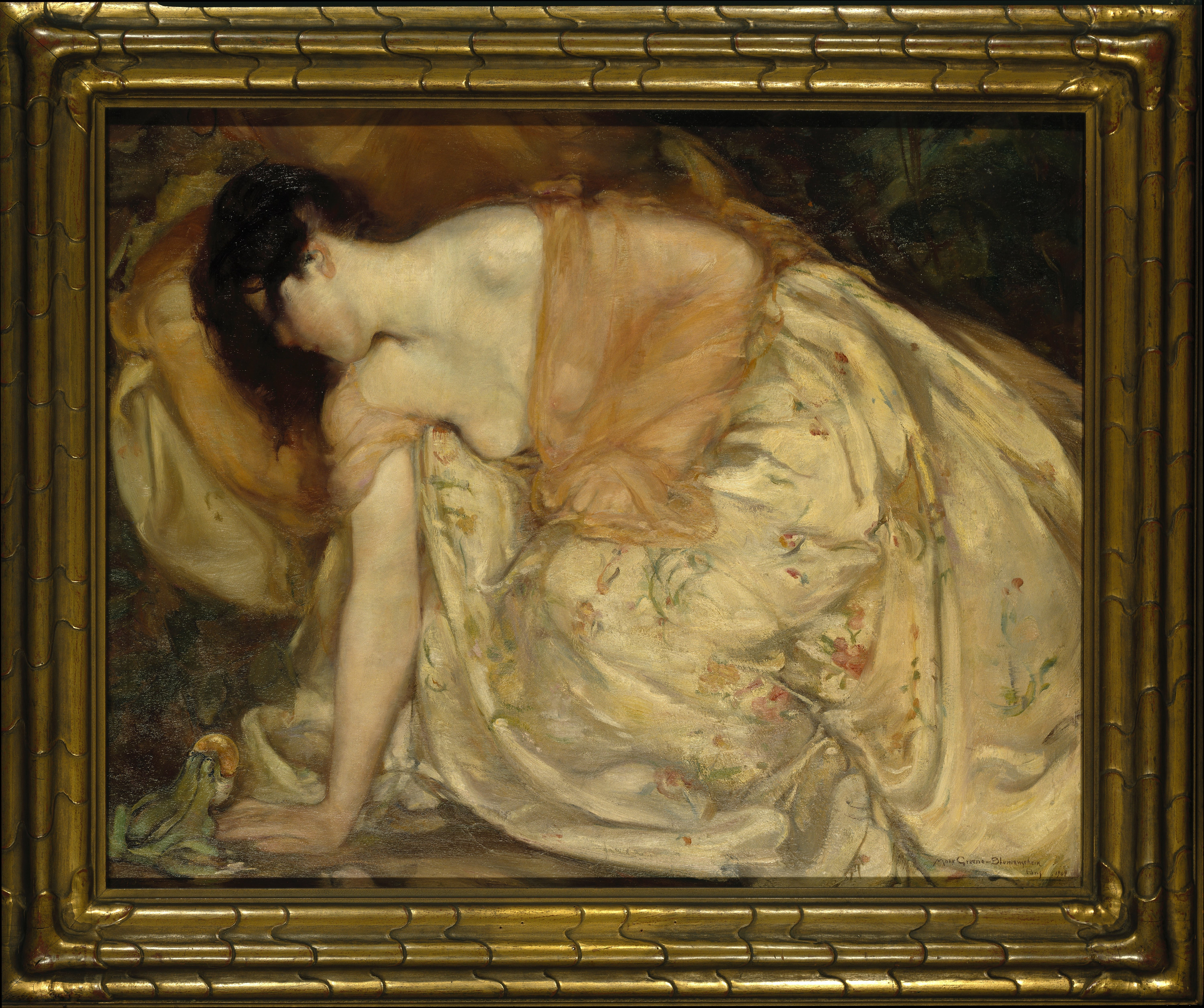
Mary Shepard Greene Bluemenschein - The Princess and the Frog - Google Art Project

From 1906 to 1946 she exhibited her paintings at the National Academy of Design.

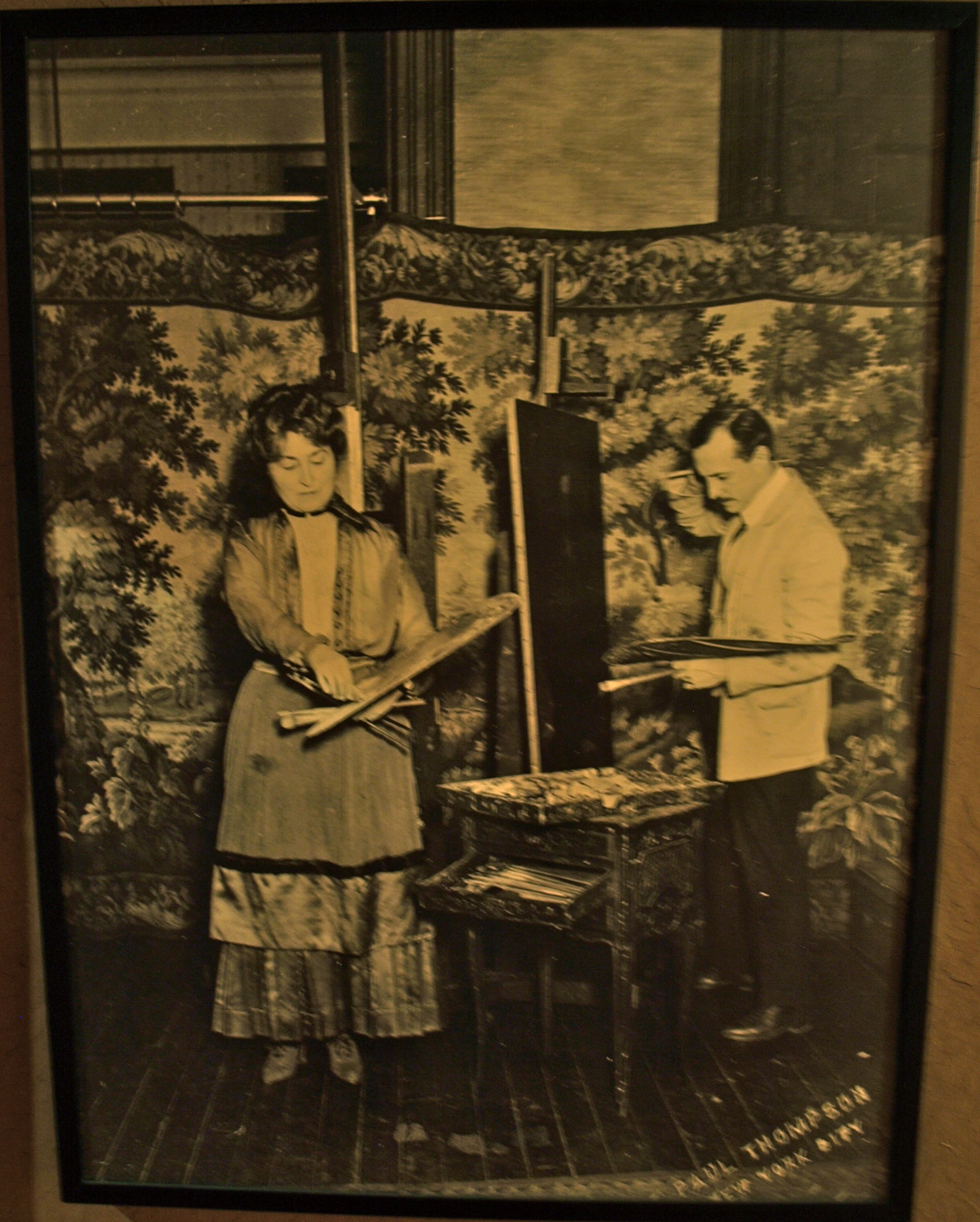
Ernest and Mary Blumenschein, New York, 1910.

In Paris in 1905, she met and married Ernest L. Blumenschein, also an artist. They moved back to New York in 1909 for the birth of their daughter, Helen. While there, they taught at Pratt and did work for various magazines such as McClure's, American and Century.

Her husband had discovered Taos, New Mexico after an accident stranded him there in 1898. While he made annual summer trips there Mary stayed in New York. She made her first trip to Taos in 1913. After the sale of a house she had inherited made them financially independent, the Blumenscheins moved to Taos in 1919, eventually becoming part of the Taos Society of Artists. Mary's painting Acoma Legend was included in the "American Art Today" exhibition at the 1939 New York World's Fair.

In the 1920s Mary returned to the Pratt Institute to study jewelry making. Her jewelry was exhibited in 1956 at the Museum of International Folk Art. Her paintings are part of the collection of the Brooklyn Museum. Shepard Greene was included in the 2018 exhibit Women in Paris 1850-1900.

== Honors ==
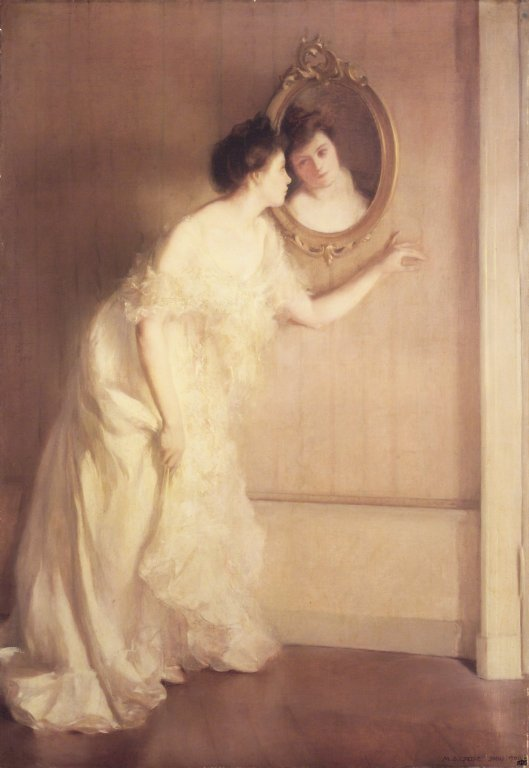
Un Regard Fugitif

In 1900 she won third place at the Salon in Paris. At the 1902 Salon she received a gold medal, becoming the second American woman to do so. In 1904 she received a silver medal in St. Louis at the Louisiana Purchase Exposition. In 1915 she received the Julia A. Shaw Memorial Award from the National Academy of Design.
