= Taos Art Museum =

Coordinates: 36°24′37.6″N 105°34′10.2″W

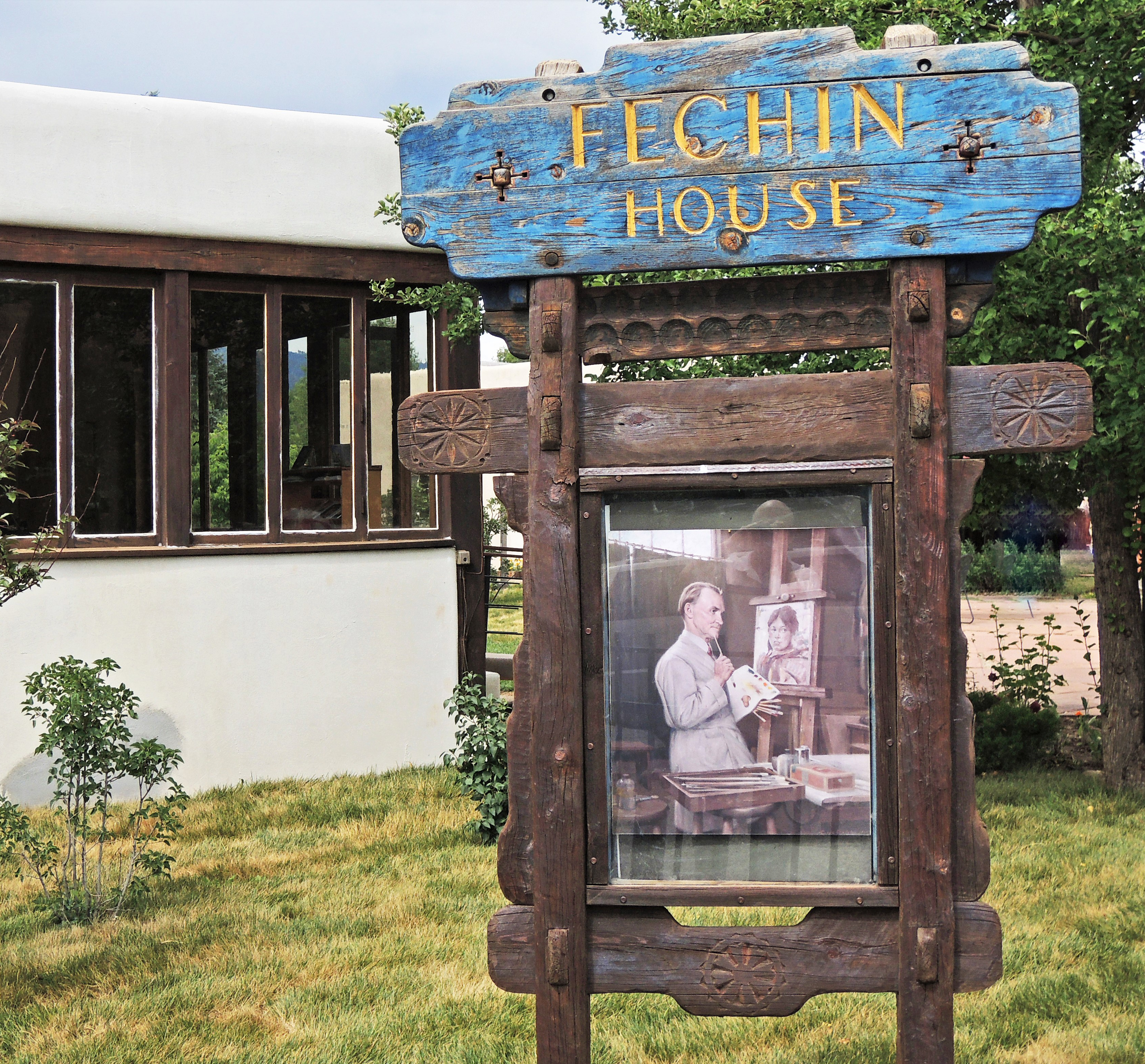
Fechin House entry sign

The Taos Art Museum is an art museum located in Taos, New Mexico in the Nicolai Fechin House. This was the home of Russian artist Nicolai Fechin, his wife Alexandra, and daughter Eya. The museum's primary aims are to improve awareness of the works and patronage of Taos artists and to nurture local artistic development. Many of the works of the Taos Society of Artists are held by museums outside of New Mexico, leading them to work to "Bring Taos art back to Taos."

== Collection ==
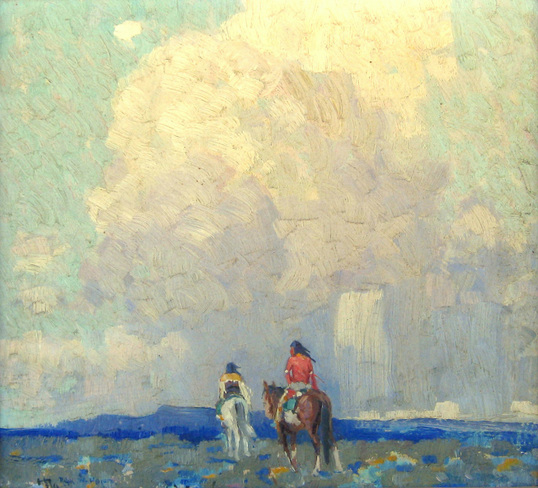
'The Rains Across' by Ralph Waldo Emerson Meyers, c. 1919.

The Museum's permanent collection features Nicolai Fechin's House and Studio. These architectural masterpieces united Fechin’s artistic sensibilities and architectural skills combining Russian, Native American, Spanish, and Art Deco styles.

The permanent collection includes works by Fechin and members of the Taos Society of Artists. Nearly all members are represented, including Joseph Henry Sharp, Bert Geer Phillips, Oscar E. Berninghaus, Ernest L. Blumenschein, Walter Ufer, E. Irving Couse, W. Herbert Dunton, Joseph Fleck, Ernest Martin Hennings, William Victor Higgins, Catherine Critcher, Gustave Baumann, Bror Julius Olsson Nordfeldt, and Julius Rolshoven.

The vitality of the Taos art colony, catalyzed by TSA members and other artists represented in the collection such as Leon Gaspard, Joseph Imhoff, Gene Kloss, Ila Mae McAfee, and Dorothy Brett, was sustained in the 1940s by the Taos Moderns. Deeply influenced by the Great Depression and the turbulent currents of Modernism, these artists included Andrew Dasburg, Louis Leon Ribak, Beatrice Mandelman, Emil Bisttram, Howard Cook, Cliff Harmon, and Ward Lockwood, who are represented.

Following World War II, Taos became a crossroads in contemporary American art, combining the influences of American and European Modernism and the bright light, exceptional landscapes, and cultural diversity of the region that inspired generations of artists such as Rod Goebel, Walt Gonske, Jackson Hensley, Charles Stewart, Julian Robles, and R.C. Gorman.

== History ==
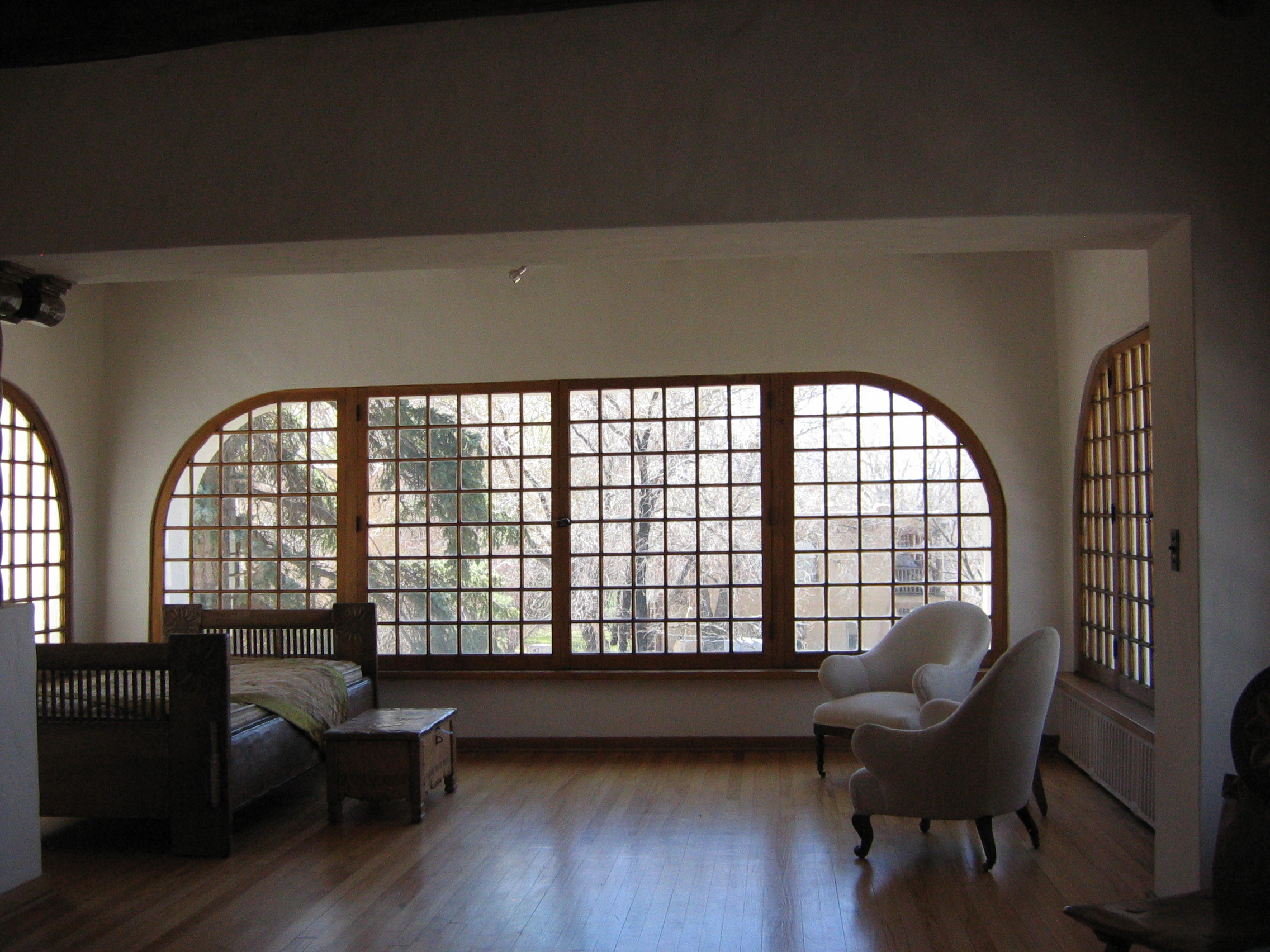
Fechin House - Daughter's bed on view in the sunroom on second floor

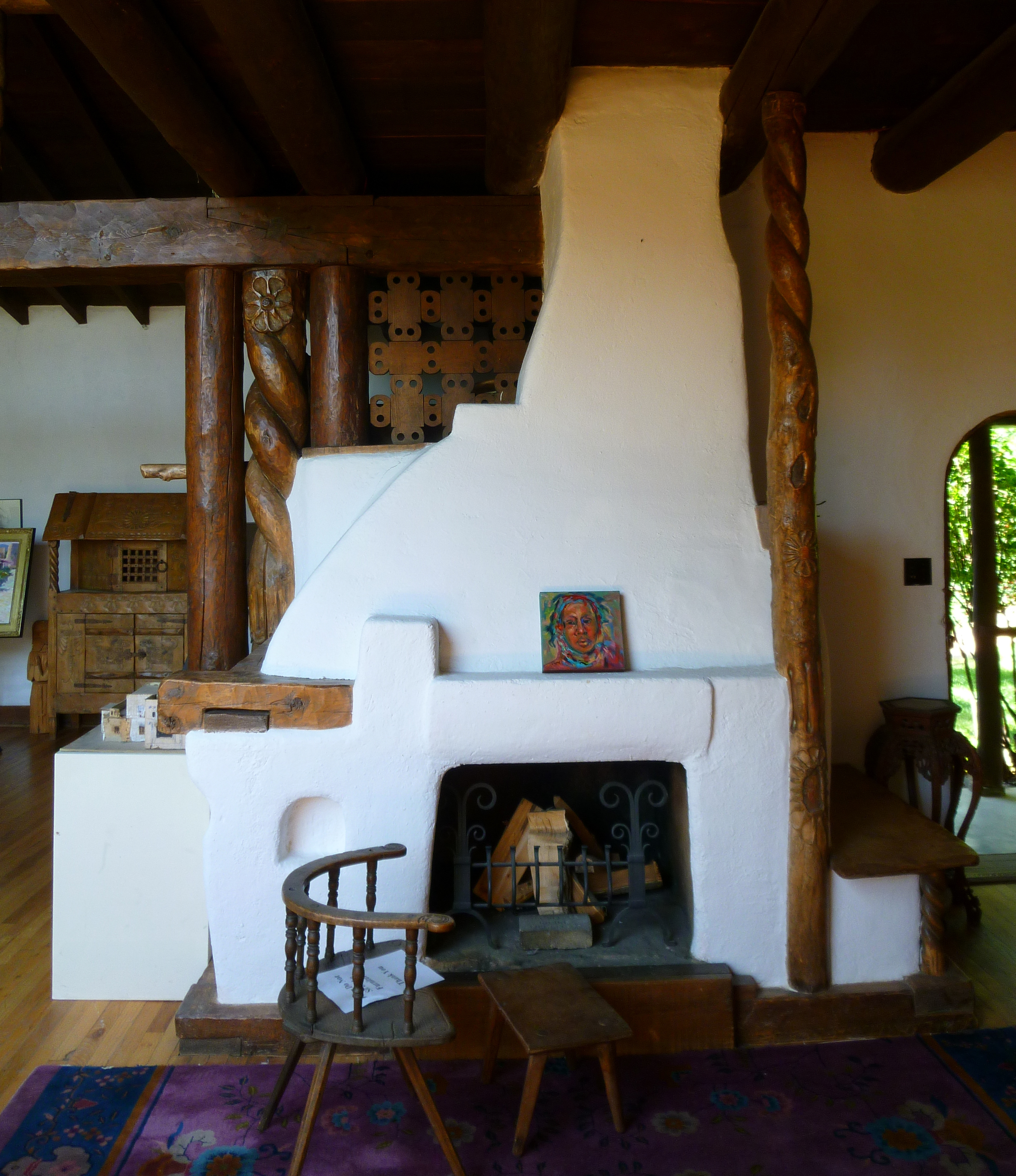
Fechin Studio interior fireplace detail. Furniture and woodwork were all hand-carved by Nicolai Fechin.

The Taos Art Museum opened in 1994 to exhibit the collection of Edwin and Novella Lineberry in memory of Lineberry's first wife, artist Duane Van Vechten. 2003 marked the official opening of the Museum in its current location, built between 1927 and 1933, and with its new name, Taos Art Museum at Fechin House.

== Fechin House ==
The house of Russian-American artist Nicolai Fechin was added to the U.S. National Register of Historic Places on December 31, 1979, and is also a New Mexico Registered Cultural Property. Eya Fechin opened the house to the public as a museum in 1979. She continued living there until her death in November 2002.

The Board of the Taos Art Museum acquired the Fechin property and installed security and lighting systems, treated the windows to filter ultraviolet rays, and refinished the interior walls and floors.

== See also ==
- National Register of Historic Places listings in Taos County, New Mexico
- Millicent Rogers Museum
- Harwood Museum of Art
- Taos art colony
