= Fernand Lungren =

American painter (1857–1932)

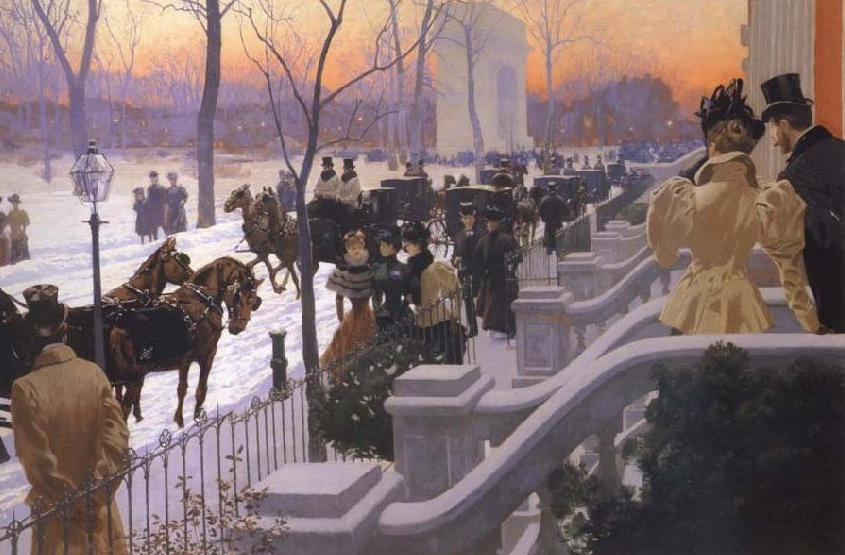
- Washington Square, New York, 1897; painting by Fernand Lungren
- Born: Fernand Harvey Lungren; 13 November 1857, Hagerstown, Maryland, US
- Died: 9 November 1932; Santa Barbara, California, US
- Education: University of Michigan, Pennsylvania Academy of the Fine Arts, Académie Julian
- Known for: Painter and illustrator, especially of California desert and American tribal scenes
- Movement: Barbizon school; Californian Plein-air school
- Spouse: Henrietta Whipple

Fernand Lungren (1857–1932) was an American painter and illustrator. He is mostly known for his paintings of American Southwestern landscapes and scenes (in California, New Mexico, Arizona) as well as for his earlier New York and European city street scenes.

He is famous for his vibrantly colored paintings of the Southern California desert, especially in the Death Valley and Mojave Desert area, which expresses the immensity, colors and solitude of these landscapes.

== Early years ==
Born in Hagerstown, Maryland, of Swedish descent, on November 13, 1857, Fernand Lungren was raised in Toledo, Ohio. He showed an early talent for drawing but his father induced him to pursue a professional career and in 1874 entered the University of Michigan, Ann Arbor, to study mining engineering. However, after meeting the painter Kenyon Cox (1856-1919), he was determined to follow a career as a visual artist.

At the age of 19, and following a dispute with his father, Lungren was finally permitted to enrol at the Pennsylvania Academy of the Fine Arts in Philadelphia, where he studied under Thomas Eakins (1844-1916) and Robert Frederick Blum (1857–1903). He also studied briefly in Cincinnati and in 1882, he furthered his studies in Paris at the Académie Julian, but only remained there for brief period, abandoning formal study for direct observation of Parisian street life. It was during this period that he painted In The Cafe.

== Illustrator in New York City ==
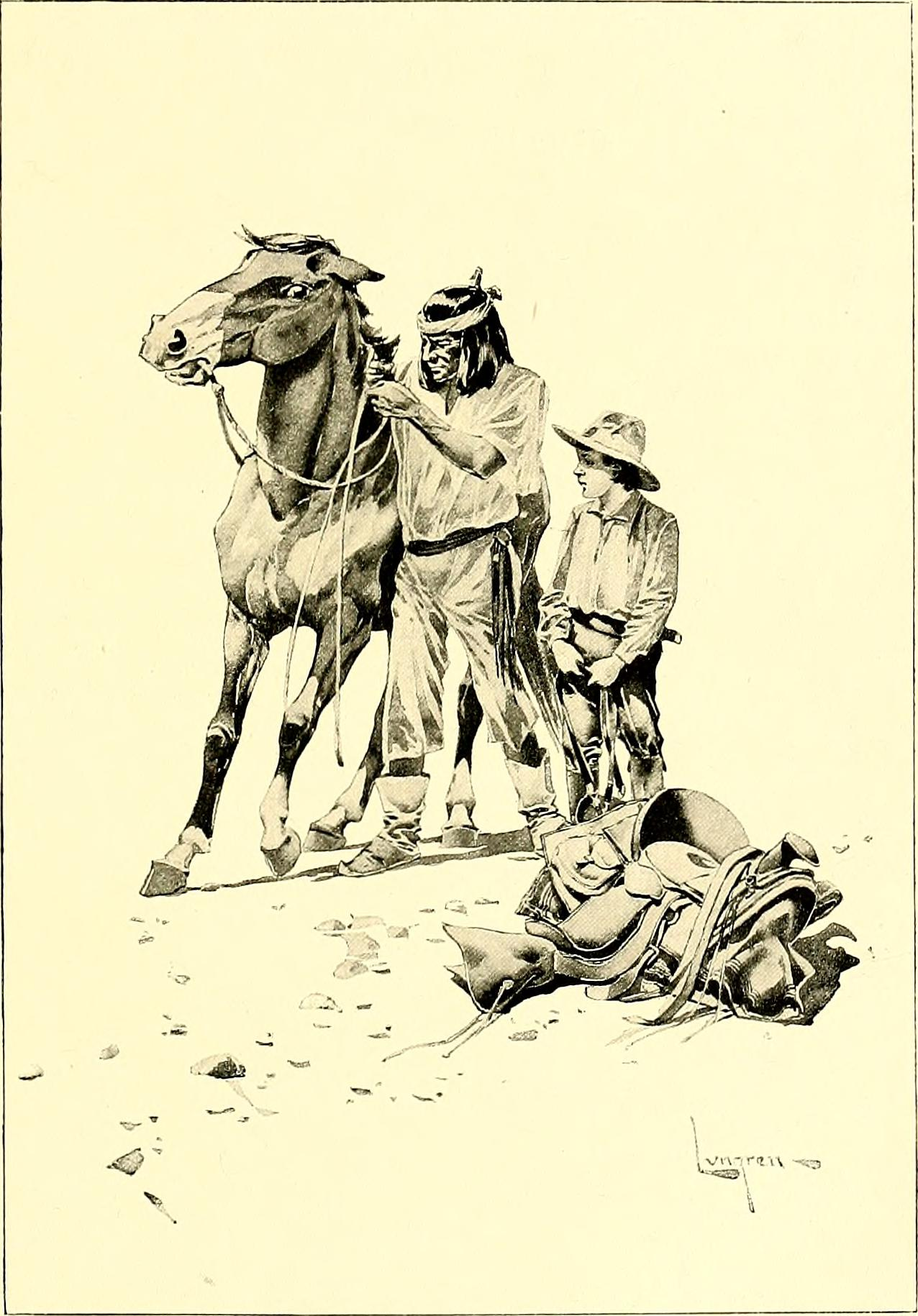
Illustration from St. Nicholas, (serial) (1873)

In 1877, now twenty years old, and upon completion of his studies, Fernand Lungren moved to New York City. There he rented a studio with the prominent painter and pastellist Robert Frederick Blum. In New York City, he found work as an illustrator for Scribner’s Monthly (renamed Century in 1881) during the period known as "the Golden Age of American illustration". His first illustration appeared in 1879 and he continued to contribute to Scribner’s Monthly until 1903. He was also an illustrator for the children's magazine, Saint Nicholas from 1879 to 1904 and later for Harper’s, McClure’s and The Outlook. His illustration work in these periodicals focussed on portraits, landscapes and social scenes, which gave him some notoriety as the illustrator of New York street scenes.

In 1878, he helped found The Tile Club, an association of young artists who gathered for the purpose of painting on decorative tiles. Among the members of the club were William Merritt Chase, J. Carroll Beckwith, John Twachtman, Winslow Homer, J. Alden Weir, and Robert Frederick Blum.

== Visit to Europe, return to New York, Cincinnati ==
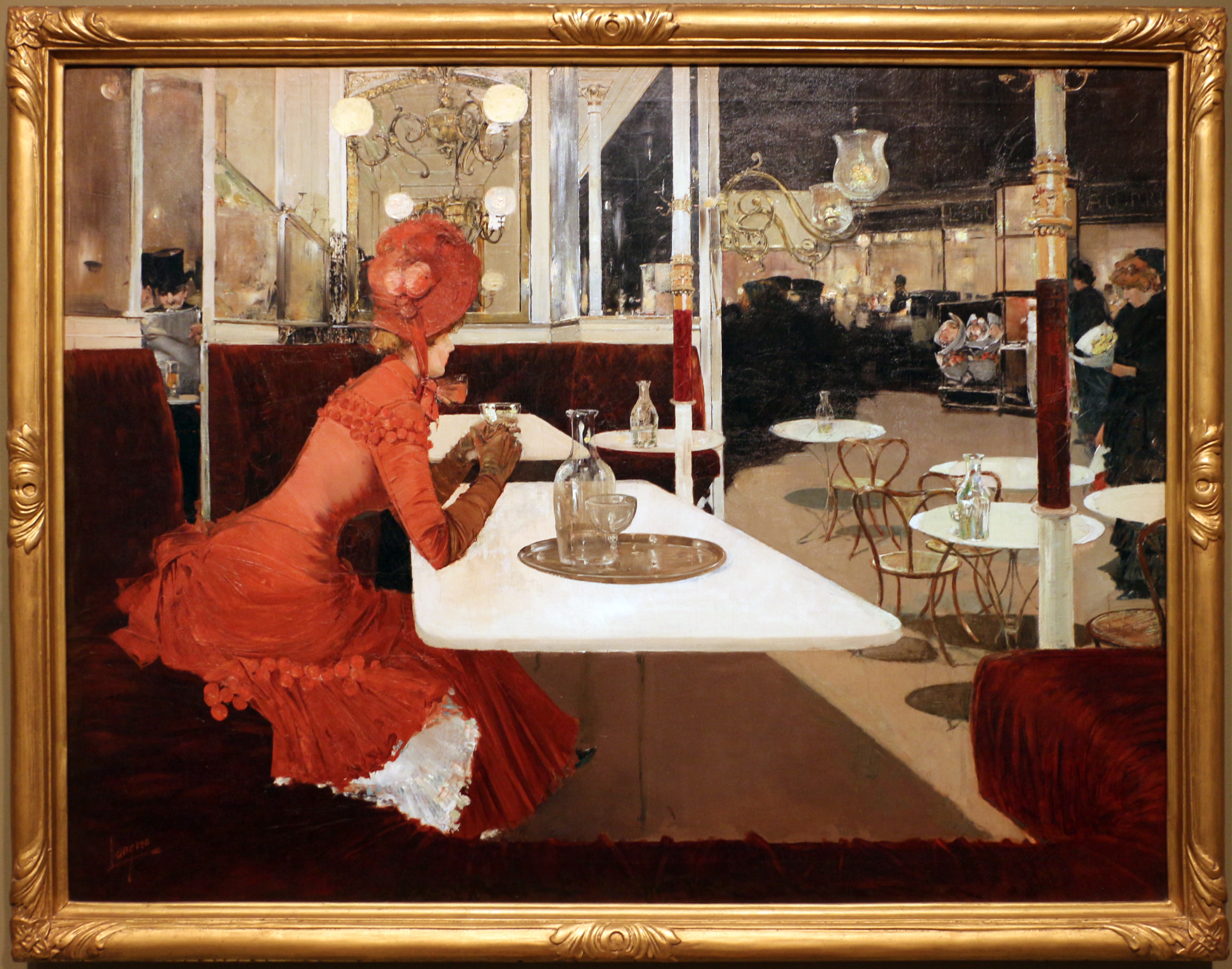
Il cafè, painting by Fernand Lungren, 1882-84

In 1882, Fernand Lungren traveled to Paris with Robert Frederick Blum. In Paris, Lungren enrolled briefly at the Académie Julian and saw French Impressionist artists at work. Disappointed with the academic art that he observed, and eager to experience life, Lungren left his Paris studies and traveled to the town of Barbizon, South East of Paris, near Fontainebleau, where a colony of artists had been established just a decade earlier. In the village of Grez-sur-Loing, near Barbizon, he became acquainted with artists who were practicing plein-air (outdoor) painting.

Returning to America in 1883, Lungren first settled in New York, then moved shortly thereafter to Cincinnati, Ohio. There, he was encouraged to explore Western subjects by fellow artists Frank Duveneck, Joseph Henry Sharp, and Henry Farny, who were teaching at the Art Academy of Cincinnati. Coincidentally, while teaching an illustration course in Cincinnati, he convinced Ernest Blumenschein to change his studies from music to art, and was therefore instrumental in forming Ernest Blumenschein's career as a renowned artist, noted for his paintings of Native Americans, New Mexico and the American Southwest.

== Discovering Santa Fe: South-Western and Indian themes ==
In 1892, the Santa Fe Railway hired Lungren to sketch scenes along its route. He spent eight months in Santa Fe, New Mexico, visiting the Indian pueblos, and the next year spent several months living with the Hopi Indians in Arizona. He was eventually made a member of several Indian tribes and priesthoods. In 1895, Lungren created illustrations of the Moquis, Navajo, and Apache people for Harper’s Magazine. His most famous illustration "Thirst", depicting a dying man and a dead horse, was published in 1896 in Harper’s Weekly and attracted much attention across the U.S. From this time, he turned his attention to painting and sketching Indian people and their culture.

He married Henrietta Coflin Whipple in 1898, then spent three years in London, England. During his stay, he exhibited some of his views of the American desert and produced a number of images of London street life. During their three-year stay, Lungren became highly skilled at the use of pastel, a chalk-like colored drawing medium, exhibiting the results with success. Lungren met many prominent artists in London, including James Abbott McNeill Whistler, with whom the couple became good friends. During this period, he exhibited at the Royal Academy. He also participated in shows at the Walker Art Gallery in Liverpool.

Late in 1900, he traveled to Egypt for seven months with the medical scientist Henry Solomon Wellcome. There he created pastels of the pyramids, but many of the pastels and sketches that resulted were lost when his baggage was damaged on the return journey.

== California ==
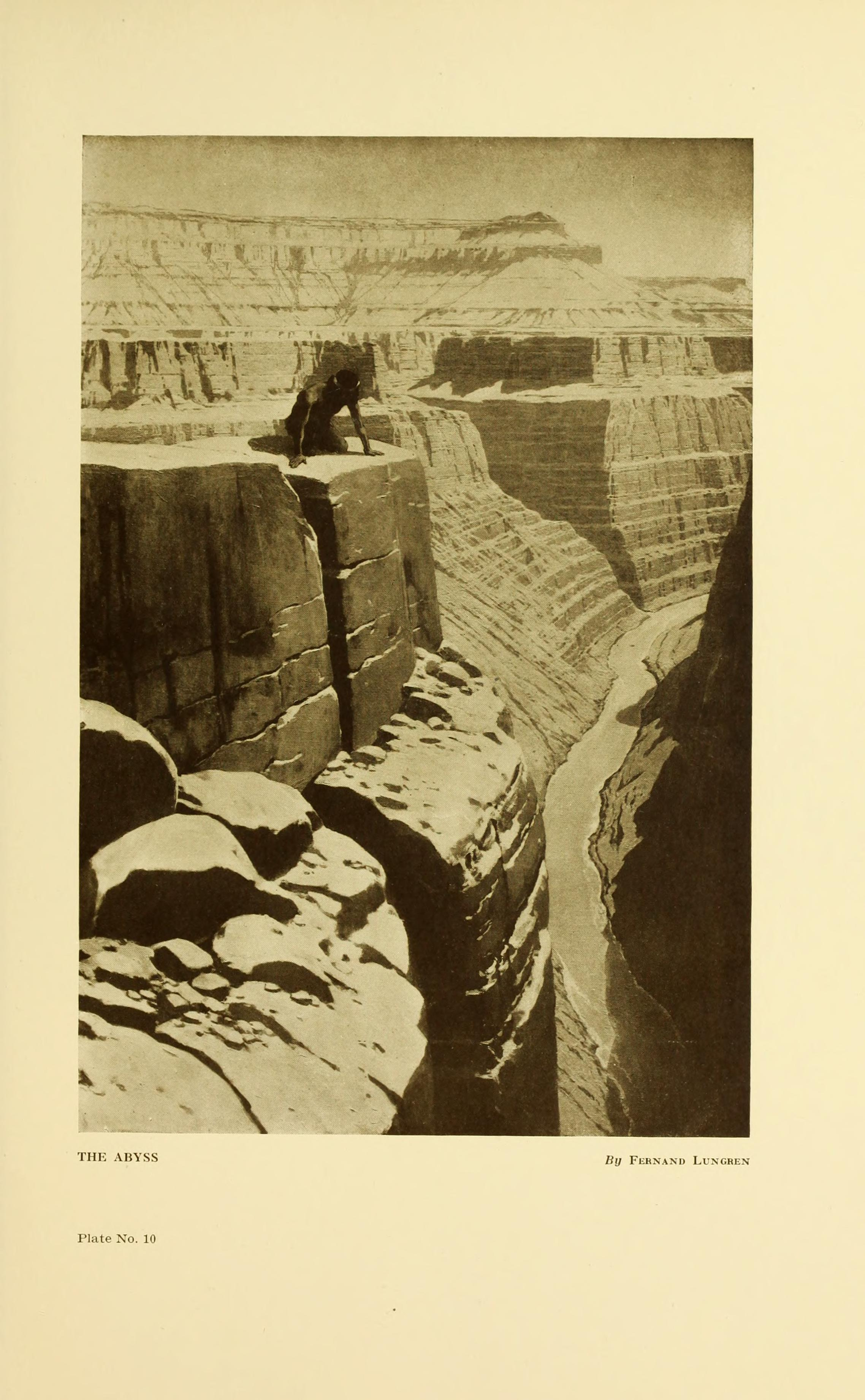
Illustration from Art in California: A survey of American Art, 1916

In 1901, Lungren returned to the United States. After settling initially in New York, he moved to Los Angeles, California, in 1903. Three years later, he established his home in Santa Barbara, commenting in 1914 that "as a field for artistic endeavor, it would be impossible to find a spot more favored than Santa Barbara".

In 1909, Lungren made his first of many trips to the Death Valley and Mojave Desert region, North East of Los Angeles, California, where he focused on scenes of the desert in all conditions of weather, seasonal change and time of the day, producing several famous paintings of these landscapes, with often poetic rendition of the specific desert atmosphere.

In the same period, Lungren authored the illustrations of three books by the American nature writer Stewart Edward White:The Mountains (1904), The Pass - Mountaineering Through the Late 19th and Early 20th Centuries (1906) and Camp and Trail (1907), based on the experience he had acquired when staying and painting in New Mexico and Arizona. In return, Stewart Edward White wrote the foreword for the first Fernand Lungren biography written by John A. Berger and published in 1936 (Schauer Press, Santa Barbara, CA).

An important figure in the Southern California art scene in the early twentieth century, Lungren helped found the Santa Barbara School of the Arts in 1920 with the sponsorship of the Community Arts Association of Santa Barbara. He remained a resident of Santa Barbara until his death in 1932.

Although not born and educated in California, Lungren can be associated to the California Plein-Air Painting school, by his outdoor subjects and his impressionist style during the last third of his life when he was living in California.

== Collections ==
Lungren donated 320 of his paintings and drawings to the Santa Barbara State College, which ultimately became the University of California, Santa Barbara; his collection is kept at the university's Art, Design & Architecture Museum (formerly the University Art Museum).

In addition to the University of California, Santa Barbara, other public collections with works by Fernand Lungren include the Santa Barbara Museum of Art; the Orange County Museum of Art, Newport Beach, California; the Laguna Art Museum; the Hubbell Trading Post Museum, Ganado, Arizona; the Art Institute of Chicago, Illinois; the Terra Foundation for American Art, Chicago, Illinois; the Toledo Museum of Art, Ohio; the Corcoran Gallery of Art, Washington, D.C.; the Mead Art Museum, Amherst College, Massachusetts; the Wallace Collection, London.

== Exhibitions ==
Elizabeth Brown has described Lungren as Santa Barbara's most important artist. Art historians have suggested that he was largely responsible for establishing desert scenery as a subject worthy of exploration.

- 2010: "The Desert Speaks: The Art of Fernand Lungren" - Wildling Art Museum, Solvang, CA
- 2007: "The Urban Myth: Visions of the City" - Sullivan Goss - An American Gallery - Santa Barbara, Santa Barbara, CA
- The Montecito Salon II - Sullivan Goss - An American Gallery - Montecito, Montecito, CA
- 2005: California Art from the Permanent Collection - Part I, The Beginning, 1832-1925 - Laguna Art Museum, Laguna Beach, CA
- 2001: Homage to the Square - Berry-Hill Galleries, New York City, NY
- 2000 - 2001: "Afterglow in the Desert - The Art of Fernand Lungren" - Art Museum at University of California, Santa Barbara, CA, then Laguna Art Museum, Laguna Beach, CA, (January–March), then Palm Springs Desert Museum, Palm Springs, CA (April–June).
- 2000: Fernand Lungren - Sketches of the West - Santa Barbara Museum of Art, Santa Barbara, CA
- 1987: Fernand Lungren - Art Museum at University of California, Santa Barbara, Santa Barbara, CA
- Paintings by Fernand Lungren were also featured in the following thematic exhibitions:
- 1959: Two Centuries of American Art: 1750-1950 - The Art Institute of Chicago, Chicago, IL

== See also ==
- Maynard Dixon
