= Nicolai Fechin House =

Historic house in New Mexico, United States

- U.S. National Register of Historic Places
- NM State Register of Cultural Properties
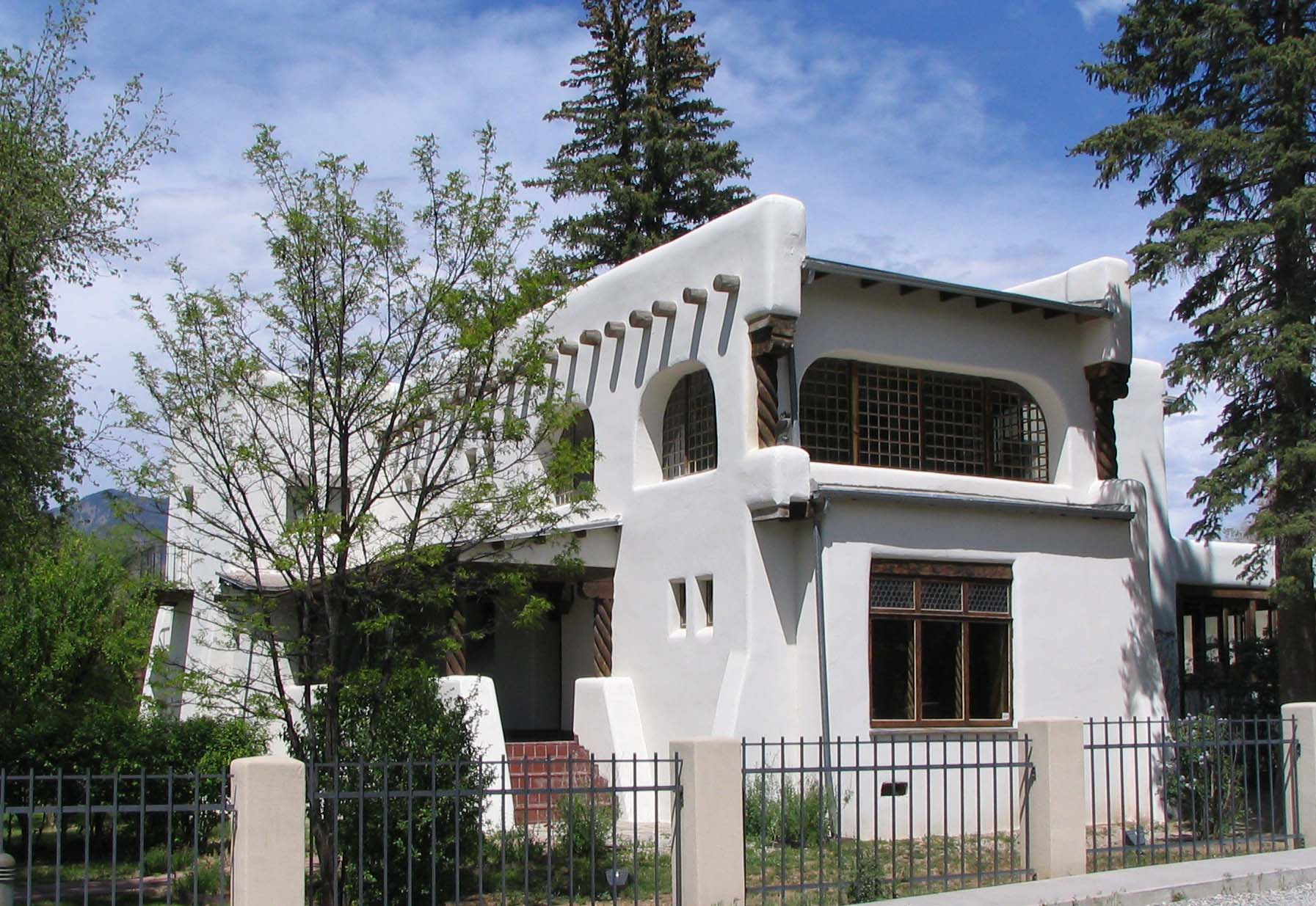
- Exterior of Fechin House museum

- Location within New Mexico
- Location: 227 Paseo del Pueblo Norte, Taos, New Mexico
- Coordinates: 36°24′37″N 105°34′9″W
- Area: 5.7 acres (2.3 ha)
- Built: 1917
- Architect: Nicholai Fechin
- Architectural style: Pueblo Revival
- NRHP reference No.: 79001558
- NMSRCP No.: 718

Significant dates
- Added to NRHP: December 31, 1971
- Designated NMSRCP: June 22, 1979

The Nicolai Fechin House in Taos, New Mexico, is the historic home of the Russian artist Nicolai Fechin, his wife Alexandra and daughter Eya. After purchasing the house in 1927, he spent several years enlarging and modifying the two-story adobe structure, for instance, enlarging the porch and adding and widening windows to take advantage of the views. He carved many of the fittings of the house and its furniture, using typical Russian design elements such as "triptych windows and intricately carved doors." The whole reflects a modernist sensibility combined with Russian, Native American, Spanish, and Art Deco traditions.

The Fechins divorced in 1933, after which Alexandra stayed at the house until a few years before her death in 1983. Eya returned to Taos in the 1970s and began restoration of the house. She opened it to visitors beginning in 1981, under the auspices of the Fechin Institute, which she founded in her father's memory.

The house was added to the U.S. National Register of Historic Places on December 31, 1979. After Eya Fechin's death in 2002, the house passed to her daughter and son-in-law. They sold it to a foundation, which established the house museum and the Taos Art Museum.

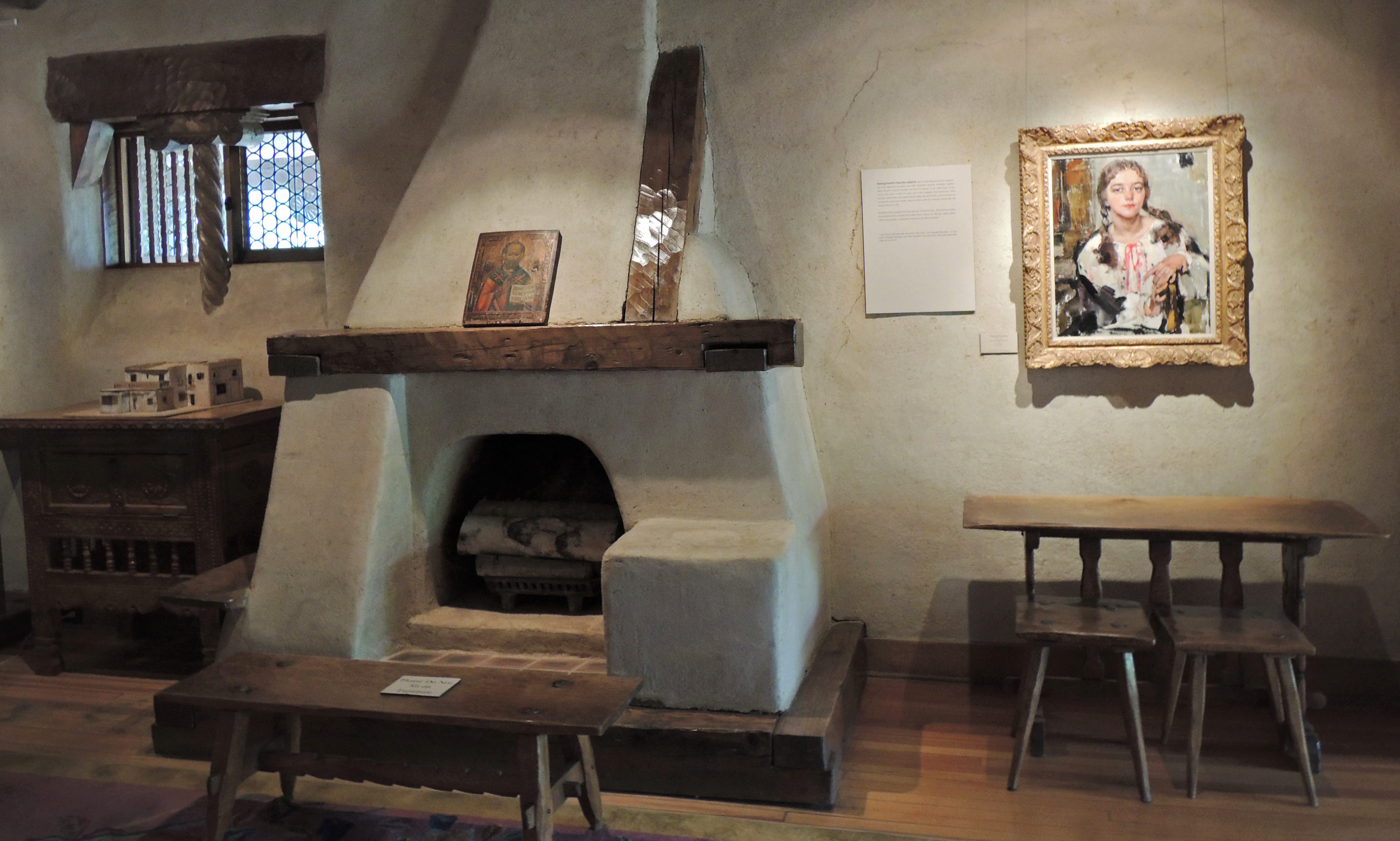
Living Room

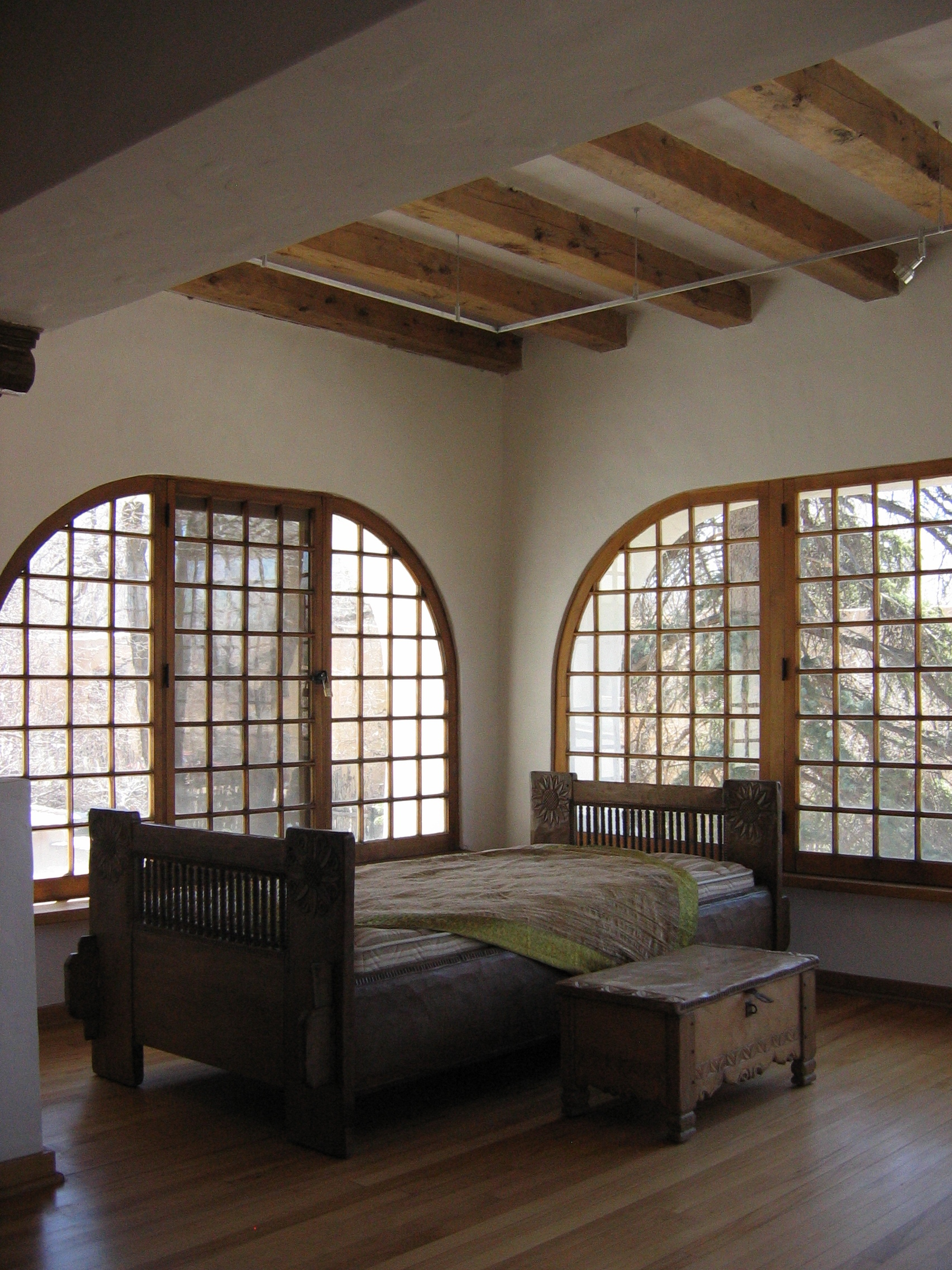
Sunroom in the Fechin House

== See also ==
- Harwood Museum of Art
- Millicent Rogers Museum
- National Register of Historic Places listings in Taos County, New Mexico
- Taos art colony
