= Manuel Marin (sculptor) =

Manuel Fernandez (1942–2007), otherwise known as Manuel Marin, was an artist and a convicted art forger. After working in the art world for 30 years, he admitted to making and selling millions of dollars of forgeries, mainly copies of works by the American sculptor Alexander Calder. Fernandez and his wife, Monica Savignon, served prison sentences for their crimes, and as part of their sentencing, they agreed to never again create works in the style of another artist. However, Marin's sculptures created under his own name but many clearly referencing the work of other artists continue to be sold through galleries and auction houses in the US and Europe.

== Biography ==
Fernandez was born in 1942 in Cieza, Murcia, Spain. Fernandez grew up in Spain, and as a teenager, he trained as a bull fighter.

In his twenties, he moved to London and, then, New York where he made and sold art.

He later settled and continued working in Tenafly, New Jersey with his wife and children. He also owned a home and spent time in Malaga, Spain. Artnet's price database shows that since 2007, 417 of his sculptures have come up for sale at auction, selling for thousands of dollars.

Manuel Fernandez died in 2007.

== Conviction ==
Following an FBI investigation, a federal grand jury indicted Manuel Fernandez and Monica Savignon on fraud and conspiracy charges in 1997. At that time, the couple had been producing and selling forged artworks for over a decade.

The court reported that they had sold over two million dollars of these forged artworks. Fernandez created the works while Savignon acted as art dealer, consigning the works to auction houses and selling them to collectors. Most notably, Fernandez and Savignon sold more than $1.5 million worth of counterfeit Alexander Calder works, often mobiles or standing mobiles, some of which Fernandez signed with CA to mimic Calder's signature. The couple also made fake copies of works by the artist Romare Bearden.

Their crime was far-reaching; they sold these forged artworks in the United States, Spain, England and France. The couple even convinced Sotheby's, the auction house, to sell a fake Calder work by providing false provenance history for the sculpture.

Richard Vitrano, another convicted art conman, testified at his April 2000 hearing that "Mr. Marin was probably the most prolific art counterfeiter in the New York City area in the '80s." Vitrano claimed that Marin's crimes went beyond those addressed in the aforementioned case. Vitrano said from Marin "we bought a [Guy Pène] Du Bois, Thomas Hart Benton, a William Aiken Walker, a Warhol, we bought a [Pierre] Lesieur. We bought a Hans Hoffman, which was the larger one. We bought a [A.F.] Tait. We bought a Henry Farney."

In order to protect their identities, the couple operated under different aliases. As mentioned above, Manuel Fernandez usually sold art under the pseudonym Manuel (Manny) Marin, but court records document that he also used the names Giuseppe Marin, Manuel Marcel, and Manuel Cisneros. Monica Savignon went by Franchesca Agnelli, Monica Marcell, Monica Rabassa, Monica Fernandez, Monica Marin, and Monica Cisneros.

In 2000, Manuel Fernandez and Monica Savignon were convicted in federal court on fraud and conspiracy charges. Fernandez and Savignon were sentenced to the maximum prison time for their crimes, 33 months. The court also ordered that the couple pay $2,695,00 in restitution. In their sentencing, Fernandez and Savignon agreed that they would not "in any way, shape or form endeavor to create, consign, transfer or sell any art work made in the likeness of a known work or artist."

== Later life ==
Having moved home to Spain, Marin continued to create sculpture. In clear violation of his sentencing, Marin produced sculptures in the form of mobiles in a style reminiscent of Alexander Calder, though under Marin's own name and using his own studio stamp. Despite their problematic nature, these works, typically created in steel and featuring suspended geometric forms painted in strong primary colours, appear frequently on the market at galleries and leading auction houses offered at prices a tiny fraction of what Calder's work can command, which may explain their widespread popularity.
