= Henry Farny =

19th and 20th-century American artist

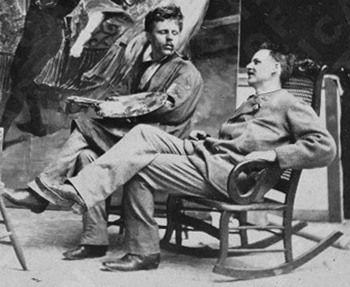
Henry Farny (right) with Frank Duveneck in 1874

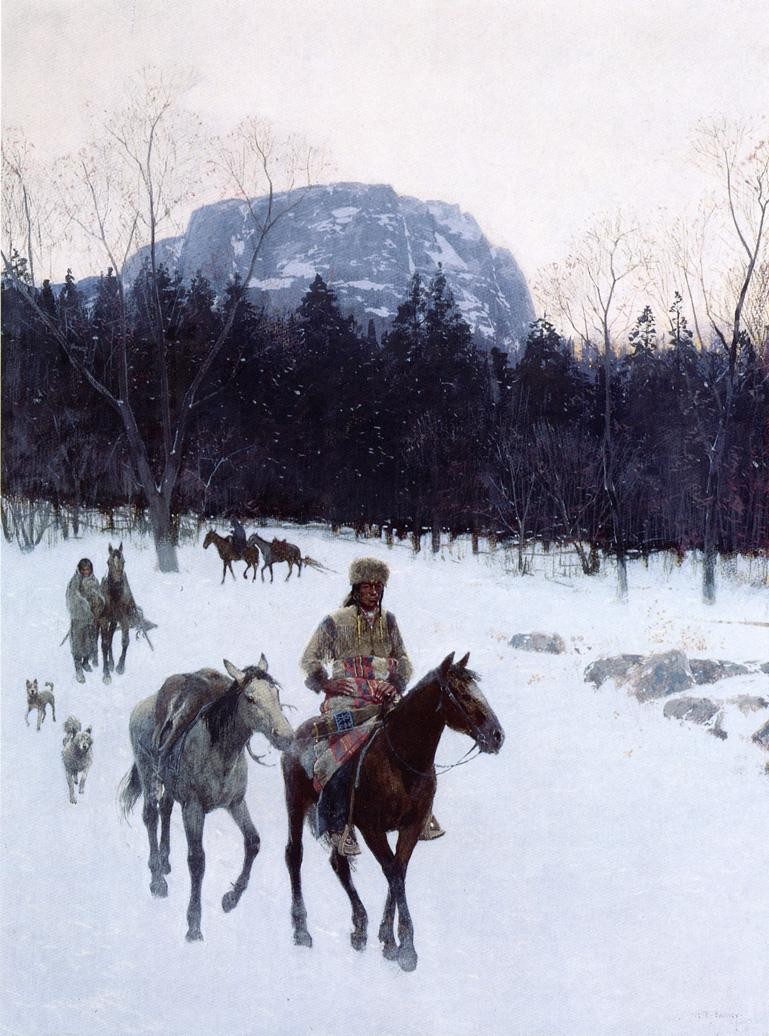
Obsidian mountain in the Yellowstone, 1897

Henry François Farny (15 July 1847 – 23 December 1916) was an American painter and illustrator. His work was centered on the life of Native Americans in the 19th-century United States.

== Biography ==
Farny was born in Ribeauvillé. His family left France in 1853 to emigrate to the United States. The family moved to Warren, Pennsylvania, near a Seneca reservation. As a child, he learned the lore of the woods from Seneca Indians, who came from their reservation to hunt in the neighborhood where his father lived. In his boyhood, he was fond of covering the walls of his father's board-house with pictures of animals, birds, and Indians, which he scratched with nails or framed by aid of burnt sticks.

Around 1859, the Farny family moved to Cincinnati, Ohio. Attracted by painting and drawing, the young man became an illustrator for magazines and books for children. When he was 18 years old, Harper's Weekly published a double-page view of Cincinnati he made.

Between 1867 and 1870, he took private lessons from Albert Bierstadt in Düsseldorf. By the time Farny had arrived at Düsseldorf, and began attending Düsseldorf academy in the late 1860s, the Düsseldorf school of painting had already begun to lose its once high acclaim among most of the American populace.

One part of America where this was not the case was in Cincinnati, where the realist objectives taught there were still being held in high esteem. Despite this, upon his return to Cincinnati in 1870, Farny, who had been studying abroad, came home to a minimally responsive demand by Cincinnatians for his paintings. He used his newfound skills in the service of poster painting and other odd jobs. In 1873, this all changed when he was commissioned by the chamber of commerce to depict in drawing the different stages of pork packing in Cincinnati.

In 1881, inspired by the developing market for Indian paintings, Farny traveled up the Missouri River, making sketches, taking notes and photography, and collecting artifacts. On several more trips West, he did the same, until his Cincinnati studio contained enough material for almost any Indian subject he wished to illustrate. Upon his return to Cincinnati, he remarked: "The plains, the buttes, the whole country and its people are fuller of material for the artist than any country in Europe."

About 100 paintings were inspired by Farny's western trips in the 1880s. Ration Day at Standing Rock Agency, The Song of the Talking Wire, and The Last Vigil are among his most famous. His understanding of the Indian's plight is often apparent in his work.

Farny was one of the founding members of the Cincinnati Art Club and served as its second president from 1892–94.

Theodore Roosevelt once said to Farny: "Farny, the nation owes you a great debt. It does not realize it now, but it will some day. You are preserving for future generations phases of American history that are rapidly passing away."

He died in Cincinnati in 1916. His obituary appeared in the Cincinnati Enquirer on December 25, 1916.

== Legacy ==
Farny's art continues to gain in popularity, and most serious public as well as private Western art collections include at least one painting. Recently, his Southern Plains Indian Warrior sold at Bonhams for £224,097 (US$362,500) - more than three times its original estimated value.

== Artworks ==
American Gallery: Henry Farny (1847–1916)

Selected artworks

Year	Title	Image	Dimensions	Collection	Comments
1878	The Silent Guest, oil on canvas		40.2 in × 30.1 in (102.2 cm × 76.5 cm)	Cincinnati Art Museum, Cincinnati, OH	IAP 40800019
1885	The Captive, gouache/watercolor	color image	22.3 in × 40.0 in (56.7 cm × 101.6 cm)	Cincinnati Art Museum, Cincinnati, OH	IAP 40800021
1887	The Unwelcome Guests, oil on canvas		38.0 in × 48.3 in (96.5 cm × 122.7 cm)	Cincinnati Art Museum, Cincinnati, OH	IAP 40800949
1888	The Water Carriers (or Drawing Water), watercolor		8.4 in × 16.1 in (21.3 cm × 40.9 cm)		IAP 62641434
1890	Hunting Camp on the Plains, oil on canvas		22.1 in × 38.6 in (56.1 cm × 98.0 cm)	Cincinnati Art Museum, Cincinnati, OH	IAP 40800950
1891	Indian Brave, watercolor		10 in × 6 in (25.4 cm × 15.2 cm)		IAP 63003525
1892	Renegade Apaches, oil on canvas		32.6 in × 22.6 in (82.9 cm × 57.5 cm)	Cincinnati Art Museum, Cincinnati, OH	IAP 40800011
1895	Conspiracy, watercolor	color image	15.4 in × 9.6 in (39.1 cm × 24.4 cm)	American Heritage Center, University of Wyoming, Laramie, WY	IAP 59040012
1896	Chief Spotted Tail (1896?), watercolor		10 in × 7 in (25.4 cm × 17.8 cm) or 10.3 in × 15.1 in (26.2 cm × 38.4 cm)		Subject: Chief Spotted Tail (1823-1881), Brulé, branch of Sioux tribe. IAP 82190580 IAP 86040016
1896	Pastures New, watercolor	color image	12.3 in × 18.3 in (31.2 cm × 46.5 cm)	American Heritage Center, University of Wyoming, Laramie, WY	IAP 59040013
1899	Something Stirring, gouache/watercolor	color image	12.5 in × 9.5 in (31.8 cm × 24.1 cm)	American Heritage Center, University of Wyoming, Laramie, WY	IAP 59040011
1899	Cheyenne Scout			Christie's	
1902	Big Game in Sight, gouache/watercolor	color image	10.6 in × 5.6 in (26.9 cm × 14.2 cm)	American Heritage Center, University of Wyoming, Laramie, WY	IAP 59040005
1900	The Old Buffalo Trail, watercolor	color image	28.5 in × 20.5 in (72.4 cm × 52.1 cm)	American Heritage Center, University of Wyoming, Laramie, WY	IAP 59040015
1902	Indian Elk Hunting, oil on canvas			Cincinnati Art Museum, Cincinnati, OH	
1904	The Song of the Talking Wire, oil on canvas			Taft Museum of Art	
1905	Fording a Stream (or Breaking a Pony; or Fording the Stream), oil on canvas		21 in × 32 in (53.3 cm × 81.3 cm)		IAP 43590039
1906	The Last of the Herd, oil on canvas		22.1 in × 38.6 in (56.1 cm × 98.0 cm)	Cincinnati Art Museum, Cincinnati, OH	IAP 40800951
1906	Rounded Up, by God (or Rounded up by God) (1906?), oil	color image	40 in × 22 in (101.6 cm × 55.9 cm)	American Heritage Center, University of Wyoming, Laramie, WY	IAP 59040006
1909	On the Trail Home (or On the Home Trail), oil	color image	14 in × 24 in (35.6 cm × 61.0 cm)	American Heritage Center, University of Wyoming, Laramie, WY	IAP 59040007
1910	Pere Marquette (or Into the Unknown), oil	color image	41.5 in × 23 in (105.4 cm × 58.4 cm)	American Heritage Center, University of Wyoming, Laramie, WY	IAP 59040008
1911	The Moment of Suspense (or A Moment of Suspense), oil	color image	24 in × 16 in (61.0 cm × 40.6 cm)		IAP 86040041
1912	Departure for the Buffalo Hunt, oil on canvas		22 in × 32 in (55.9 cm × 81.3 cm)		IAP 86040032 IAP 8C280012
	Fort Totten Trail, watercolor		8.3 in × 15 in (21.1 cm × 38.1 cm)		IAP 63005226
	The Thunder Horse, oil	color image	16.6 in × 24 in (42.2 cm × 61.0 cm)	American Heritage Center, University of Wyoming, Laramie, WY	IAP 59040014
	Silent Guest, oil		11.7 in × 8.3 in (29.8 cm × 21.0 cm)		IAP 61515285

== See also ==
- Lafcadio Hearn
