= Joseph Henry Sharp =

American painter (1859–1953)

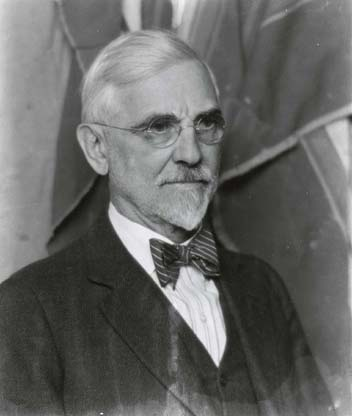
- Joseph Henry Sharp, c. 1910
- Born: September 27, 1859; Bridgeport, Ohio
- Died: August 29, 1953; Pasadena, California
- Education: McMicken School of Design; Art Academy of Cincinnati; Royal Academy of Fine Arts (Antwerp); Royal Academy of Fine Arts (Munich); Académie Julian
- Known for: Painting
- Movement: Taos Society of Artists

Joseph Henry Sharp (September 27, 1859 – August 29, 1953) was an American painter and a founding member of the Taos Society of Artists, of which he is considered the "Spiritual Father". Sharp was one of the earliest European-American artists to visit Taos, New Mexico, which he saw in 1893 with artist John Hauser. He painted American Indian portraits and cultural life, as well as Western landscapes. President Theodore Roosevelt commissioned him to paint the portraits of 200 Native American warriors who survived the Battle of the Little Bighorn. While working on this project, Sharp lived on land of the Crow Agency, Montana, where he built Absarokee Hut in 1905. Boosted by his sale of 80 paintings to Phoebe Hearst, Sharp quit teaching and began to paint full-time.

In 1909, he bought a former chapel in Taos to use as a studio, near the house of the artist E. Irving Couse. In 1912 he and his wife moved to the area full-time. He built a house with studio near the chapel. Both artists' homes and studios are part of the Eanger Irving Couse House and Studio—Joseph Henry Sharp Studios, which is listed on the US National Register of Historic Places.

== Early life and education ==
Sharp was born in Bridgeport, Ohio on September 27, 1859, to Irish immigrant parents. His father was a merchant by trade. From childhood, Sharp was fascinated with anything to do with American Indians. As a boy, Sharp nearly drowned in a swimming accident. He was pulled from the water and carried to his home by friends who thought he was dead. His mother resuscitated him, but the incident permanently damaged his hearing, and he gradually became totally deaf. As a result, he had to learn to read lips and carried a writing pad with him.

Sharp's father died when he was twelve years old. Soon after, the boy began working in a nail factory to help support his family. By age 14, his hearing loss made continued schooling impossible. He quit school and moved to Cincinnati, where he lived with an aunt and worked to support himself and send money to his mother. He studied briefly at the McMicken School of Design, then enrolled at the Art Academy of Cincinnati.

In 1881, Sharp traveled to Europe, where he studied for a year at the Royal Academy of Fine Arts in Antwerp, Belgium.

He returned to the United States and in 1883 made the first of his journeys to the American West, visiting the states of New Mexico, Arizona, California and Wyoming, where he began sketching members of the Pueblo, Umatilla, Klikitat, Shoshone and Ute Indian tribes.

In 1885 he traveled to Europe with John Hauser, another Cincinnati artist, who studied with him at the Royal Academy of Fine Arts in Munich. Sharp also studied at the Académie Julian in Paris, and in the 1890s with Frank Duveneck in Italy.

== Artistic career ==
Oil paintings by Joseph Henry Sharp

Three Taos Indians

Blow Hole, Honolulu

In 1890, Sharp and 12 other Cincinnati artists formed the Cincinnati Art Club.

Sharp returned to Cincinnati where he married Addie and taught at the Art Academy of Cincinnati. During this period, he painted portraits of local society members.

In 1893, he made his second trip to the American West in the company of fellow Cincinnati artist John Hauser, who had studied in Europe with him. They visited Taos, New Mexico for the first time, Sharp on a commission from Harper's Weekly to illustrate Indian life at the Taos Pueblo. The Sangre de Cristo Mountains and the local Indian culture sparked his enthusiasm, which he shared with colleagues Ernest Blumenschein and Bert Phillips at Académie Julian the next year.

Sharp continued to teach in Cincinnati until 1902. During this period he also spent time in Montana, where he camped at the battlefield of Little Big Horn. There he painted scenes of native life and portraits of members of the Plains tribes, including the Crow, Sioux, and Nez Perce. In 1900, these portraits were exhibited in Washington, D.C. The Smithsonian Institution bought eleven of the portraits.

Sharp came to the attention of President Theodore Roosevelt, who took an interest in him and commissioned him to paint portraits of 200 Native American warriors who had survived the Battle of the Little Big Horn. To be able to stay in the area, Sharp apparently made a private arrangement with Samuel Reynolds, the US Indian Commission agent of the Crow Agency, Montana, and gained permission to build a log cabin on government land. It was near the confluence of two rivers. Essentially the Crow Agency owned the cabin, which Sharp and his wife Addie built in 1905 with the help of local prison labor, arranged for and mostly supervised by Reynolds.

Sharp called the cabin Absarokee Hut. He designed it as a one-room cabin, with a lean-to containing a bedroom and kitchen. The ridgepole of the cabin was high enough (16.5 ft.) to allow a balcony at one end, where he hung animal hides and Indian blankets for privacy, to make the space behind it usable as a guest bedroom. The Sharps furnished the cabin in an Arts and Crafts style and decorated it with their collection of Indian artifacts, which included Navajo rugs, a buffalo robe, shields, pottery, and baskets. The cabin was featured in The Craftsman magazine. In an unusual arrangement, Sharp lived and worked there rent-free, and finally was permitted to buy the cabin in 1922.

Phoebe Hearst (mother of William Randolph Hearst) bought 80 of Sharp's paintings of Native Americans. This enabled him to quit teaching, move into Absarokee Hut with Addie, and devote himself to painting. Hearst commissioned an additional 75 portraits to include members of every major Great Plains tribe. (Hearst's entire collection of 155 of Sharp's paintings was eventually donated to the University of California, Berkeley.)

Sharp continued to spend some summers in New Mexico, and in 1909 he purchased a former Penitente chapel in Taos for use as a studio. It was near the home of the artist E. Irving Couse. The Sharps finally made a permanent move to Taos in 1912, where Addie died in 1913. Responding to the new landscape and light of New Mexico, Sharp began to change some of his techniques. Although he had trained as an academic painter and usually worked in his studio, he adopted plein air painting for the first time. In 1915, along with Couse, Sharp became one of the six founding members of the Taos Society of Artists, of which he was the most senior and experienced. They worked as a sales cooperative to develop Taos internationally as a recognized artistic community. They continued the Society until 1927.

== Winters in Hawaii ==
Starting in 1930, Sharp vacationed for a number of winters in Hawaii together with his second wife, Louise. While in Hawaii, Sharp painted only for pleasure. At the request of a local gallery owner, Sharp agreed to show some of his work. The Sharps wintered in Hawaii for the next eight years, except for 1931 and 1933, when they wintered in Mexico and the Orient respectively.

== 1949 retrospective ==
The Gilcrease Museum (Tulsa, Oklahoma) featured a retrospective of Sharp's work in 1949. The Museum currently curates the largest collection of Sharp's work worldwide.

== Death and legacy ==
Sharp closed the studio in Taos when he was 93 years old to travel to California. While he intended to return to Taos the next year, he fell ill and died in Pasadena, California on August 29, 1953. Over his lifetime, Sharp had produced around 10,500 works of art, including oil paintings, etchings, monotypes, pastels, and watercolors. Of these works, fully 7,800 are of Native American subjects, including 3,200 portraits. He was a historian of the West as well as a painter, and helped to preserve the record of a way of life that was changing.

His painting "View of the Taos Pueblo" was stolen on December 14, 2022, from a truck in Boulder, Colorado. It was recovered the next month in Lakewood, Colorado.

=== Studio ===
Sharp built a two-story house with studio near the chapel. His historic studios in Taos are maintained as part of The Couse/Sharp Historic Site at 146 Kit Carson Road by The Couse Foundation, which offers scheduled and private tours. It is listed on the National Register of Historic Places and the New Mexico Register of Cultural Properties.

== See also ==
- Oscar E. Berninghaus
- W. Herbert Dunton
- E. Martin Hennings
