= Wilbur G. Adam =

American portrait and landscape painter

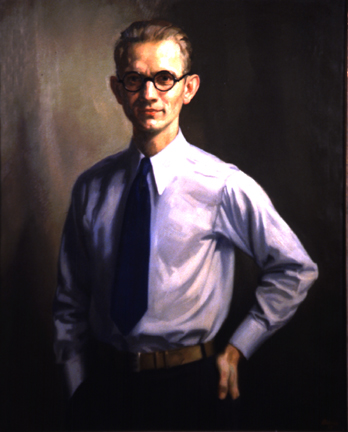
- Born: July 23, 1898; Cincinnati, Ohio, US
- Died: March 23, 1973 (aged 74); Loveland, Ohio, US
- Education: Art Academy of Cincinnati
- Occupation: Painter
- Known for: Portraiture and landscapes
- Awards: 1921, Chaloner competition, National Academy Museum and School of New York City 1925, Peabody award, Art Institute of Chicago

Wilbur G. Adam (July 23, 1898 – March 23, 1973) was an American painter and illustrator who divided his career between Cincinnati and Chicago. He was known for his portraiture and landscapes of Western United States. In the latter part of his career he focused on Biblical illustrations.

== Early life and education ==
Adam was born in the Mount Auburn district of Cincinnati in 1898. He was one of five children of German immigrant and shoemaker Jacob Adam and his wife Eleanor.

He graduated from Cincinnati's Hughes High School in 1916 where he was named "Best Artist".

Adam began his art training at the Art Academy of Cincinnati in 1912 while a high school student and later while working part time at United States Printing and Lithograph Company in Norwood, Ohio. He studied under many famous Cincinnati artists such as Herman Wessel (1878–1969), James Roy Hopkins (1877–1969), Lewis Henry Meakin (1850–1917), Frank Duveneck (1848–1919) and Caroline Lord (1860–1927).

In 1917 he and a group of young artists from the Art Academy of Cincinnati including Bill Bollman, George Fetick, Carl Hasz, Arthur Helwig, John Holmer and Dick Sanders started a communal studio in Downtown Cincinnati on the south side of Third Street, between Walnut and Main. They called it Russet Studio.

In September 1918, Adam travelled to Stearns, Kentucky with Art Academy of Cincinnati classmate Frank Harmon Myers for a sketching trip. Myers and Adam later exhibited their work together at Traxel Galleries in Cincinnati and Adam later exhibited his Kearns paintings in the eastern US, Chicago Art Institute and Cincinnati Art Museum.

== Professional career ==
He joined the Cincinnati Art Club in 1919.

In 1921 he won second prize in the Chaloner Paris Scholarship competition of the National Academy Museum and School of New York City. He was a guest artist in 1921 and again in 1929 at the Louis Comfort Tiffany Foundation at Oyster Bay, Long Island, New York.

In 1923 he and fellow Art Academy of Cincinnati student, Arthur Helwig, travelled to the Estes Park, Colorado and the Rocky Mountain National Park where the pair focused on landscape painting for a summer. In the summer of 1924 he took a seven-week trip to California, Yosemite, Yellowstone, Grand Canyon, and Rocky Mountains.

In 1925 he set up a studio in Chicago where he received numerous commissions for portraiture work. In 1925, he won the Art Institute of Chicago's Peabody Prize for The Little Dancer.

In the summer of 1927 he travelled to Glacier National Park and was joined for a few weeks by fellow Cincinnati painter, Matthew A. Daly. With his landscape paintings, Adam revealed himself as a "colorist of distinction as well as an artist who can command a view of stupendous subjects." His paintings, "realistic to a degree, have a vividness that is almost startling." He travelled again to the West in 1928 with Cincinnati colleague, Wallace Hoess. During his visit he would make small paintings of scenes on the spot and take them back to his studio to paint over the winter.

After living in Chicago for nearly 25 years as an illustrator, he returned to Cincinnati in 1951 and established a studio on Highland Avenue. During this time he did a significant body of work for Standard Publishing and Treasure Chest as an illustrator of Biblical books and publications, including Christmas Joy (1955), Prayer Time (1955), Precious Promises (1955) Word of Cheer (1955), Life and Customs in Jesus' Time (1957) and Favorite Psalms (1960).

After returning to Cincinnati, Adam filled his many illustration commissions, and also painted portraits, particularly of institutional and business leaders. His work had a decided illustrative quality. Using bright colors and a realistic technique, Adam's paintings reflected his great skill and experience as an illustrator.

He served as president of the Professional Artists of Cincinnati in 1956–58 and president of the Cincinnati Art Club from 1965 to 1967.

== Exhibitions ==
Gypsy Girl was painted in 1927 and is an example of Adam's oeuvre. "Its bright palette and the decorative, graphic pattern on the background reflect his interest in design. His ability as a painter can be seen in the way he captured the reflections of the sumptuous satin of the gypsy's headdress and top." Cincinnati Art Museum

Adam was an invited exhibitor at the Pennsylvania Academy of the Fine Arts in Philadelphia, the Albright-Knox Art Gallery in Buffalo, the Corcoran Gallery of Art in Washington, D.C., the St. Louis Art Museum and the Cincinnati Art Museum.

=== Group exhibitions ===
All-Illinois Society of Fine Art Annual 1926

Art Institute of Chicago

- American Annual, 1924 (Still Life: Vegetables), 1925 (The Little Dancer; The Bronze Plate; and Spruce Canyon, Estes Park, Colorado), 1927 (The Elevated)
- Chicago & Vicinity 1926 (Jackson Boulevard, Maurice Tabard and Real Boys), 1930 (Saucer Burial from Porgy & Bess), 1931 (Lantern Fishermen), 1933 (Gustave Ahrenhold)

Albright-Knox Art Gallery, American Annual, 1927

Chicago Galleries Association

- Exhibition of Paintings, 1930. "The portrait of a girl in a red dress, Ruth,…is a beautifully handled portrait and exquisite in its least details."
- Portraits by Members, 1932
- Exhibition, 1952

Cincinnati Art Club

- Annual Exhibition, 1919. "Frank Myers and Wilbur Adam are two of the youngest members of the club in years, but not in importance as artists…Adam's fine draftsmanship and regard for color values are well displayed in his In the Junk Shop and Alford of the Argonne, a portrait of an Indian youth who is a student at the Art Academy. He is shown wrapped in a native blanket."
- 26th Exhibition of Painting and Sculpture, 1924. Traxel Galleries. Exhibited Before Dusk.
- Annual Exhibition, 1927. New Art Center, starting November 12. "When contemplating advancement in art, perhaps Wilbur Adam has made the greatest strides. We sight his Glacier Park paintings for their fine qualities and handsome arrangements. Particularly picturesque is The Hill Farm, where he has obtained a fine tonality." Exhibited Mountain and Meadow Glacier Park and The Hill Farm.
- Fall Opening Exhibition, 1959. Exhibited Daguerreotype.
- Fall Opening Exhibition, 1963. "Wilbur Adam has drawn Don Quixote after his heroic combat with the fierce windmill; his nag Rozinante sprawled upside down, and Sancho Panza in fright on his donkey."

Cincinnati Art Museum

The Little Dancer (1925). Winner of the Peabody Award in the 1925 Chicago Institute of Art American Annual.

- Annual Exhibition of American Art, 1919. "Wilbur Adam shows two oils, a portrait, revealing a good likeness of his colleague, Charles Locke, and an excellent still life, a brown teaport and a copper plate composed in a conventional manner but very spirited in handling, which is at once broad and yet so unaffectedly natural."
- Annual Exhibition of American Art, 1923. Exhibited Still Life.
- Annual Exhibition of American Art 1924–1928
- Exhibition of the Women's Art Club, 1923
- Annual Exhibition (Water Colors), 1925. "Wilbur Adam's group, which included two portraits, a difficult think in water color, is unusually fine. His Studio Interior is extremely well done, its small still life carefully rendered, and both the portrait heads are fine, strong and definite and full of character."
- Spring Exhibition, 1928. Adam's Roselle, a portrait of a young woman dressed in a fancy costume, has excellent qualities, besides its technical brilliance... The Elevated ... is a fine animated, pulsing record of a personal observation.
- Portraits of Present Day Cincinnatians, 1933. Exhibited portrait of Dana Dawes.
- Exhibition of Work by Teachers and Former Students, Art Academy 1938

Cincinnati Art Galleries

- Panorama of Cincinnati Art IV, 1989. The Guitar Player on exhibition.
- Panorama of Cincinnati Art X, 1995
- Panorama of Cincinnati Art XI, 1996

Corcoran Gallery of Art Biennial, 1921–22. The Elevated

Dayton Art Institute, 1925. Exhibited Portrait of Arthur Helwig.

Louis Comfort Tiffany Foundation

- Members' Works, 1922. "Wilbur G. Adam uses (color) to good advantage in landscape and his Antique Dealer is one of the best figures."

Saucer Burial from Porgy & Bess (1930) Exhibited at the 1930 Art Institute of Chicago Chicago & Vicinity exhibition.

Milwaukee Art Museum

Nebraska Art Association Annual 1926, 1928

Pennsylvania Academy of the Fine Arts

- Annual, 1925. Still Life. Vegetables.
- Annual Watercolors, 1927

Philadelphia Museum of Art, Sesquicentennial, 1926

Professional Artists of Cincinnati

- Exhibition at Pogues, 1956. Exhibited portrait of John Terrell.
- Rollman's Swifton Exhibition, 1957
- Exhibition at Pogues, 1958. Exhibited Portrait of a Girl.
- Annual Exhibit, 1959

St. Louis Art Museum, American Annual, 1926

=== One to four-man exhibitions ===
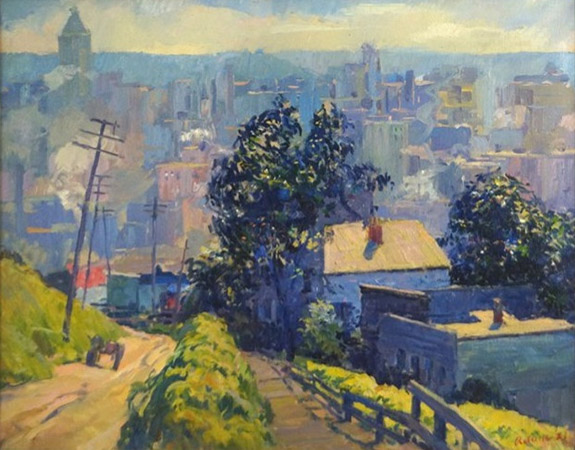
Monastery Hill (1922). Oil on canvas. Exhibited at Adam's 1922 one-man exhibition at Closson's Gallery. Sold in auction in 2015.

==== 1922 Closson Galleries ====
"Mr. Adam studied in the Art Academy of Cincinnati, and is now numbered among its most successful graduates. The present collection includes some of his most recent work. There are thirty-four subjects, many of them inspired by Cincinnati land-marks. The price range is from $10 to $60." Exhibited 34 paintings including Monastery Road, Fountain Square, The Red House and Brick Barges.

==== 1924 Traxel Galleries ====
One man exhibition, April 14–26. "There is something very sound about Mr. Adam's painting, and a definite feeling of good draftsmanship and understanding. His exhibition includes a variety of subject – landscapes, portraits, still life and figure studies. His landscapes were painted last summer at Estes Park, Colo., where he spent several months. One of the large landscapes, which he calls Entrance to Spruce Canyon, is perhaps the handsomest. It is a dramatic rendering of purple lights and brilliant sunshine. The warm rays of the sun, bursting through the clouds for just a moment, have turned everything to gold, and the cool, purple shadows of the trees and rocks give strong contrast. Near Estes Village, a smaller landscape that stands out in the group, is a sparkling rendering of sky and rich luminous mountains that have fine feeling of mass and distance. Of his four or five portraits, the one of a young man, Clarence is the finest. It is a good likeness, well drawn and painted surely and simply, with no struggle for effect, but depending solely on its fine draftsmanship and firm handling."

==== 1924 Western College for Women ====
A collection of about 30 oils, water colors, and monotypes held in the Art Gallery. "A number of the pictures have been on exhibition at Traxel's in Cincinnati, at the Cincinnati Art Museum and at the Cincinnati Art Club Exhibitions. Several have also been shown in Columbus and at the Carnegie Institute in Pittsburgh, Pennsylvania."

==== 1928 Closson Galleries ====
112 West Fourth Street, Cincinnati. One man show on Glacier Park and Estes Park paintings for two weeks from April 30, 1928. "Mr Adam has taken a high flight, choosing wide horizons and extreme panoramic views. As a landscapist, he has analyzed these views....and they are excellent documents...built up with great consideration for mass formation and stand the test of scale.. Mr. Adam…has overstepped the bounds of more conventional landscape with such a showing." Featured paintings include: Spruce Canyon, Estes Park, Two Medicine Country, Slope of Appistoki Peak, Mt Henry, Appistoki Creek, St. Mary's Lake, On the Mt. Henry Trail, Near Twin Falls and Going to the Sun Mountain.

==== 1929 Closson Galleries ====
112 West Fourth Street, Cincinnati. One man show for two weeks from March 4, 1929. "Mr Adam reveals himself as a colorist of distinction as well as an artist who can command a panoramic view of stupendous subjects – subjects which are honestly seen and rendered with uncommon courage. The paintings, realistic to a degree, have a vividness that is almost startling." Paintings exhibited include: Baring Falls, Swiftcurrent Valley, Early Morning Citadel Peak, Swiftcurrent Falls at Midday, View from Morgan Pass and Rainy Day at Mount Wilbur.

The Elevated (1926) by Wilbur G. Adam. Oil on canvas. 27.5 x 34.5 in. First exhibited at Annual Exhibition of Art Institute of Chicago in 1927. Auctioned in 2011.

==== 1930 Chicago Galleries Association ====
220 Michigan Avenue, Chicago. Two-man exhibition with Byron Boyd, to January 25. "Here again is a contemporary American artist standing on his own feet and painting in his own way uninfluenced by the novelties which so beset this century. Mr. Adam has joined the increasing band of painters who are finding the grandeurs and beauties of the west and northwest paintable. He shows a number of magnificent mountain pictures… When he leaves the mountain and comes into lower places his brush is equally able." Some of the landscape paintings exhibited were: Swiftcurrent Falls, Baring Falls, Old Man's Lake, Appistoki Peak, Rising Wolf Mountain, New Twin Falls. Other paintings were The Hill Farm, Turn in the Road, White Peonies, Bronze Plate, The Elevated, The Little Dancer, Harriet Dawes, Clare and Gertrude and Roselle.

==== 1930 Iowa State University ====
He had a two-main show with Grant Wood, May 20 to June 9 in Ames, Iowa. "Wood's portrait of the pioneer, John D. Turner, won first prize at the Iowa State Fair last year, and his House in Munich, exhibited here last fall, won the first prize offered last year by the Iowa Federation of Women's clubs. Adam is a Peabody prize winner at the Art Institute in Chicago." Two months after the show, Wood painted his iconic American Gothic.

==== 1930 Civic Arts Society ====
One-man show in November.

==== 1933 Chicago Galleries Association ====
220 North Michigan Avenue. Four young Chicago artists: Karl Brandner, Wilbur Adam, Gasper Ruffolo and C. Warner Williams (a sculptor).

==== 1963 Cincinnati Art Club ====
Wilbur G. Adam Retrospective. "Wilbur Adam is an old-fashioned portraitist, presently in a retrospective exhibition at the Cincinnati Art Club, and his work has the quiet, insistent pride of a man certain of his technique and the grounds to which he applies it, as well he may be."

== Legacy ==
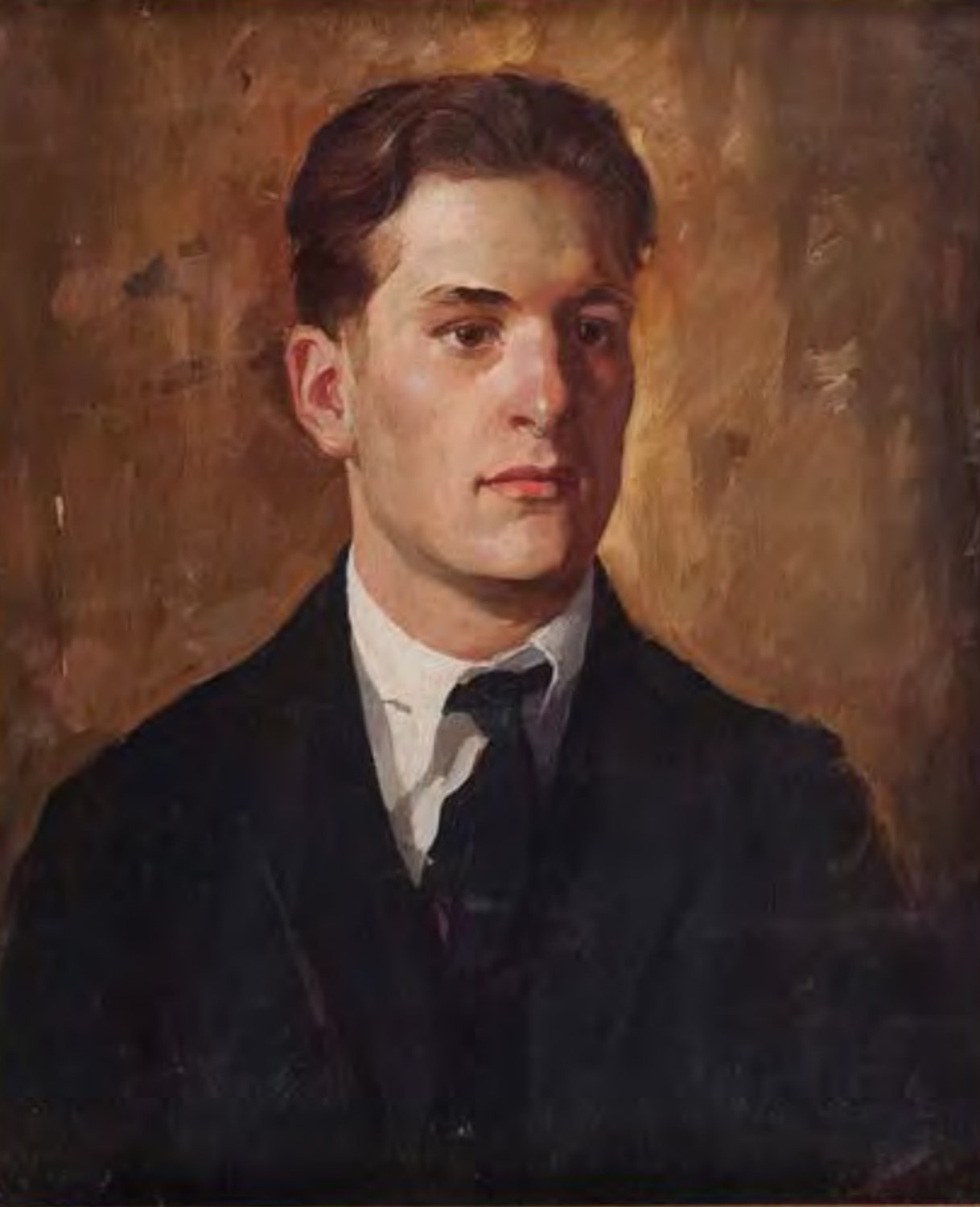
Portrait of a Young Man (1922), Adam's painting of fellow artist Paul Chidlaw, was auctioned in 2014.

Adam's work continues to appear at auctions and in exhibitions. From 2003 to 2004, Gypsy Girl was on display at the Cincinnati Art Museum as part of its exhibition entitled Exotic and Picturesque People and Places.

The Cincinnati-based auction house Cowan's Auction has auctioned nine paintings by Adam since 2008. Adam's Portrait of a Young Man was auctioned by the Art Academy of Cincinnati in 2014. Mountain Landscape, 1927 was auctioned by Leslie Hindman Auctioneers of Denver in 2014.
