= Raphael Strauss =

American painter

Raphael Strauss (1830–1901), was an American portrait artist of German descent, who worked in the United States during the latter half of the 19th century.

He was born in Bavaria, Germany in March, 1830. He immigrated to the United States and married Caroline Baermann in 1858. While in the United States, he lived most of his life in Cincinnati, Ohio. He was Vice President of the Cincinnati Art Club, and was listed in the city directory for more than 20 years.

He died in Cincinnati in 1901. He is buried in the Walnut Hills United Jewish Cemetery in Cincinnati.

Raphael and wife Caroline Goldstein were the parents of Joseph Strauss, a German–American structural engineer and designer.

== Works ==
- Examples of his work may be found at the Cincinnati Art Museum.
- Raphael Strauss worked in Central Kentucky
- Pair of Child Portraits by Raphael Strauss
- Portrait of Young Girl
