= Paul Chidlaw =

American painter

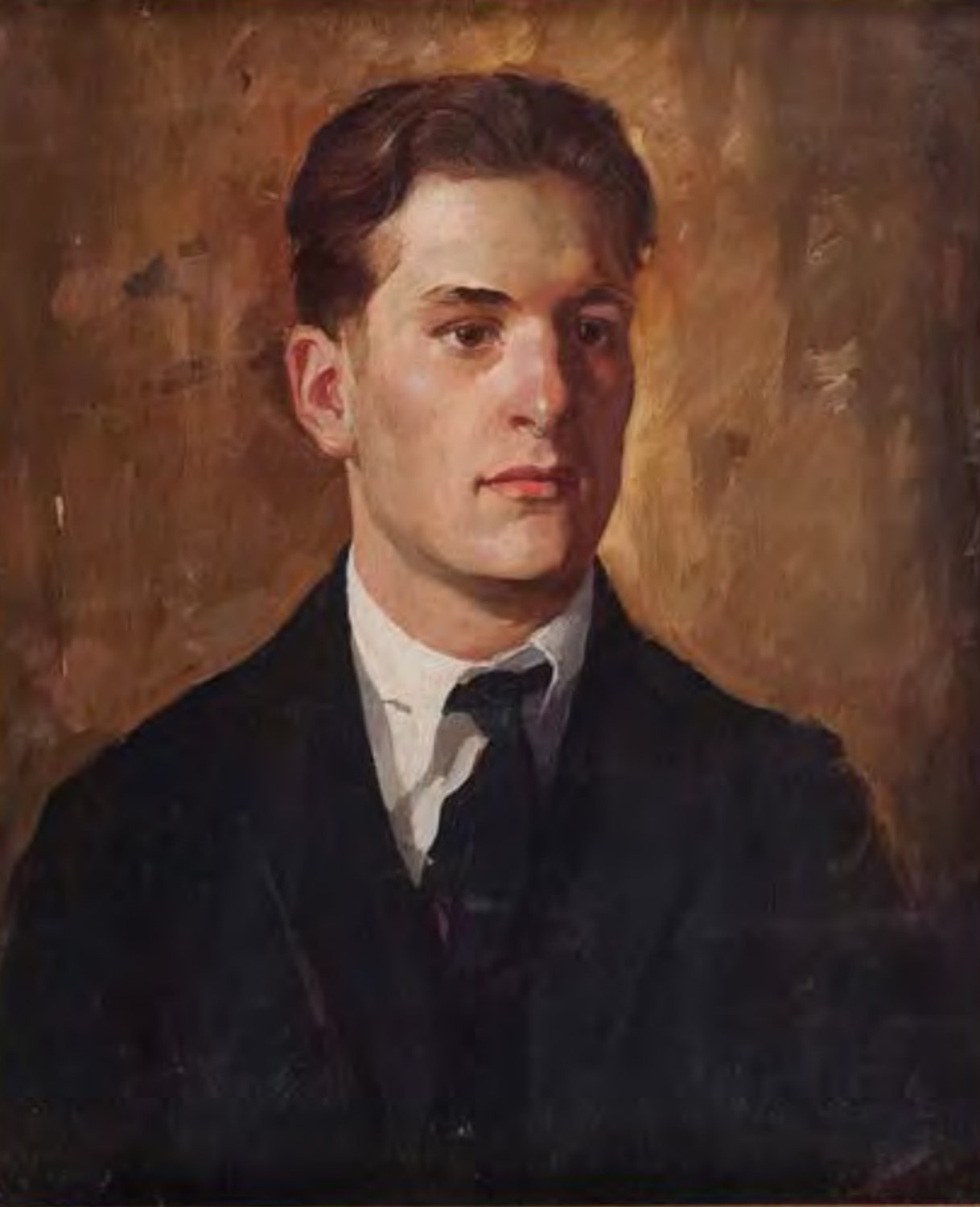
- Paul Chidlaw 1922 (painting by Wilbur G. Adam)
- Born: April 5, 1900; Cleves, Ohio
- Died: April 25, 1989 (aged 89); Cincinnati, Ohio
- Education: Art Academy of Cincinnati; L'Ecole des Beaux-Arts, Fontainebleau, France
- Known for: Abstract painting; Abstract Expressionist; art teacher

Paul Chidlaw (April 5, 1900 – April 25, 1989) was an American painter and art instructor who spent most of his career in Cincinnati, Ohio.

== Early life, studies and travels ==
Paul Chidlaw was born in Cleves, Ohio, on April 5, 1900, to Edward H. and Carolyn (Guise) Chidlaw. He resided in Cincinnati for the majority of his life. He was obsessed with the art world since the age of eight when he would get clay from the fields and creeks to make ceramics. When he was growing up in Cincinnati his aunts would take him to the Cincinnati Art Museum and they would point out the "finished" and "unfinished" works. The Frank Duveneck paintings were "unfinished."

He studied at the Art Academy of Cincinnati from 1919 to 1923.

In 1927, after working as a designer for commercial firms in Cincinnati for several years, he traveled to France and studied at L'Ecole des Beaux-Arts in Fontainebleau. He later moved to Paris and studied with Jean Despujols and André Lhote. Chidlaw found that his formal academic art training was restrictive. In 1989 while reflecting on his studies in France, Chidlaw remarked: "Because of my academic training, my painting was rather reserved. I was always trying to imitate nature. I wasn't as free. I was more less in a box." Not having yet achieved renown as an artist himself, Chidlaw had to finance his stay in Paris by finding employment in a foreign exchange section at a banker's trust.

After traveling extensively in Europe, Chidlaw lived in Morocco for a year.

== Professional career ==
Chidlaw returned to Cincinnati in 1935 and taught and painted various commissions including Works Progress Administration (WPA) murals under the Federal Art Project. During World War II, he served in the United States Army Corps of Engineers.

He taught at the Art Academy of Cincinnati from 1947 until his retirement in 1963.

After retirement, he taught drawing and painting in a studio in the Rookwood Building in Mount Adams from 1964 to 1977, when he was appointed artist-in-residence at Edgecliff College. In 1979 Edgecliff awarded him an honorary doctorate.

Toward the end of his life, his eyesight failed due to macular degeneration but he then turned to music to inspire his final abstract paintings.

== Quotes ==
If you see it, it's there. I like to leave something for the viewer to do because I don't believe that it's right for anyone to take your imagination completely away from you.

== Recognition and legacy ==
His paintings include: At the Wailing Wall (an oil painting on canvas), and The Farm Has a Song (an oil painting on canvas in 1978). He painted in oil, watercolor, acrylic, etchings, pastel, charcoal and pencil. In his 1980 painting Boogie Woogie, a "cheerful pastiche of color suggests a deluge of bright streamers and confetti drifting down from a pale winter sky at New Year's. The mood is upbeat and celebratory."

As part of the sensory process involved in creating his art, Chidlaw used a music motif as a form. Pigments vibrated in dulcet violin tones, or reverberated as percussion, and the notes of color blended in an exultant symphony of emotion. Chidlaw felt that his use of color was one of his greatest strengths, and he gave close consideration to how colors "sounded" and mingled optically on the canvas.

His colorful abstract paintings often suggested landscapes. He also was known for his calligraphy-like gesture drawings. He mentored numerous aspiring artists at the Art Academy of Cincinnati.

In 1985, the Miami University Art Museum held a major retrospective of his work entitled, Paul Chidlaw: Paintings and Graphics.

In 1986, the Art Academy of Cincinnati named the Chidlaw Gallery after him because they considered him to be one of the finest artists (and certainly the earliest abstract expressionist) in the 20th Century in the Cincinnati area.

== Notable students ==
- Jim Dine, American pop artist took classes with Chidlaw in 1953.
- Tom Wesselmann, American artist associated with the Pop Art movement

== Family ==
Childlaw married Madge Smith, a librarian at the Cincinnati Art Museum, in 1952.

He died of heart failure on April 25, 1989, at his Hyde Park home at the age of 89. He is buried at Spring Grove Cemetery in Cincinnati.
