= Is This Tomorrow =

American anti-communist propaganda comic book

Is This Tomorrow: America Under Communism
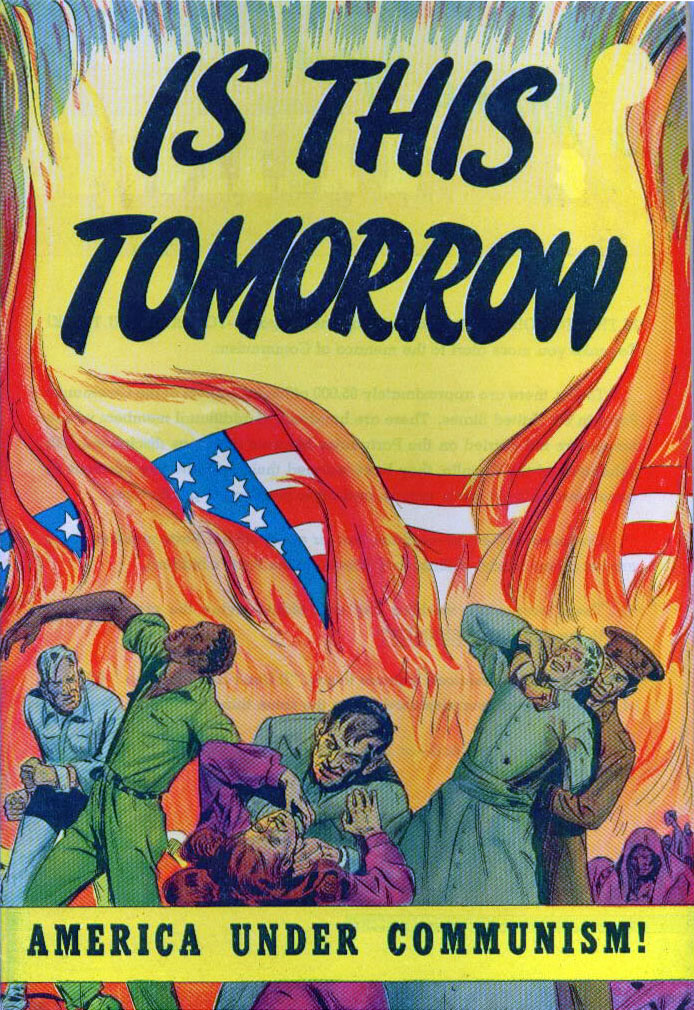
- Cover of Is This Tomorrow (1947)

Publication information
- Publisher: Catechetical Guild Educational Society
- Publication date: 1947
- No. of issues: 1

Creative team
- Artist(s): Charles M. Schulz, others

Is This Tomorrow: America Under Communism! was an anti-communist propaganda comic book published by the Catholic Catechetical Guild Educational Society of St. Paul, Minnesota, in 1947.

== Description ==
The stated purpose of the comic book was "to make you think!" about the alleged 85,000 members of the Communist Party USA plus others who serve "as disciplined fifth columnists of the Kremlin" working "day and night–laying the groundwork to overthrow YOUR GOVERNMENT!" and reduce Americans to "Communist slavery." Its 50 pages then describe a coup d'etat of the United States, led by a gullible American politician (who burns the Bible and dies just as the Communists come to power), aided by Communists who have infiltrated into high levels of the US government, and opposed by armed Catholic Americans (who are unsuccessful in stopping them). Its back page urges readers to "Fight Communism with – Ten Commandments of Citizenship."

The comic book includes some of the first published comic drawings by Minneapolis-born Charles M. Schulz, creator of Peanuts.

== Controversial release ==
The comic proved controversial upon release. Censors in Detroit banned it for gore, but backed down when a group of Catholic priests planned to distribute it.

== Legacy ==
In January 1948, Woody Guthrie wrote a magazine article about the comic book that went unpublished, called "Comics that ain't funny."

In 1991–1992, the title revived as Is This Tomorrow? in Florida Flambeau, a student-run newspaper affiliated with Florida State University and Florida A&M in Tallahassee, FL. In 2003–2005, it became a webcomic.

The comic book's cover forms the basis of the cover of the 2001 book Red Scared!: The Commie Menace in Propaganda and Popular Culture.

"Commie Plot Comics", a comic satirizing Is This Tomorrow and similar works, was published in National Lampoon in 1972.

Is This Tomorrow remains in print in the 2000s.

== See also ==
- Comic book
- Invasion, U.S.A.
- Propaganda
- Red baiting
- This Godless Communism (1961)
