= Eanger Irving Couse House and Studio—Joseph Henry Sharp Studios =

Historic house in New Mexico, United States

- U.S. National Register of Historic Places
- NM State Register of Cultural Properties
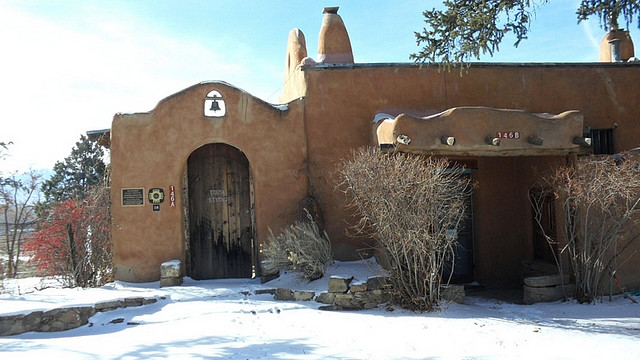
- The Couse Studio (left), formerly a family chapel

- Location within New Mexico
- Location: 146 Kit Carson Rd, Taos, New Mexico
- Coordinates: 36°24′29″N 105°34′18″W
- Area: 2.1 acres (0.85 ha)
- Built: 1909
- Architectural style: Mission/Spanish Revival, Pueblo
- NRHP reference No.: 05001096
- NMSRCP No.: 1865

Significant dates
- Added to NRHP: September 28, 2005
- Designated NMSRCP: February 13, 2004

The Eanger Irving Couse House and Studio—Joseph Henry Sharp Studios, also known as the Couse/Sharp Historic Site, is a property on the U.S. National Register of Historic Places. It includes the home and art studio of E. Irving Couse (1866–1936) and two studio buildings owned by Joseph Henry Sharp (1859-1953), both founding members of the Taos Society of Artists. It was added to the NRHP on September 28, 2005.

== History ==
E. Irving Couse, who studied art in New York and Paris, was introduced to Taos by fellow artist Ernest Blumenschein in 1902. He became part of the Taos artist colony and bought the house on Kit Carson Road in 1909. A wing was added to the house for Couse's studio and his wife developed a noteworthy garden. Following E. Irving Couse's death in 1936, no more changes were made to the house and it remains much as it did when Couse lived there, which made it "the significant building to survive from the early days of the Taos art colony."

Prior to Couse's purchase of the house in 1910, it was owned by parish priest Gabriel Ussel in the 1860s; He operated a boys' school from the house. Prior to Ussel, the house was owned by James Quinn, who in the 1850s was a scott captain serving under Kit Carson. The house was originally built by Pedro Luna in 1839.

Having spent some summers in New Mexico and having grown to appreciated the area, in 1909 Joseph Henry Sharp purchased a former Penitente chapel in Taos near the home of E. Irving Couse for use as a studio. He then built a two-story house with studio near the chapel and he and his wife Addie moved to Taos permanently in 1912. His historic studios in Taos are maintained as part of The Couse/Sharp Historic Site.

The site open to the public by appointment.

== See also ==
- National Register of Historic Places listings in Taos County, New Mexico
