= This Godless Communism =

US propaganda comic

"This Godless Communism" was an American anti-Soviet propaganda comics feature that appeared in Treasure Chest, a biweekly, subscription-only comic book distributed in parochial schools from 1946 to 1972.

Designed to inform students of the then-prevalent Western-nation conception of Communism and the Soviet Union, the 10-chapter feature began in Treasure Chest vol. 17, #2 (September 28, 1961), and continued appearing in every second issue until #20. It was drawn by artist Reed Crandall. The series began with a scenario of what the writers believed might occur should the United States fall to the Soviet Union. After this, the series took a historical approach, giving brief biographies of Karl Marx, Friedrich Engels and Vladimir Lenin, and depicting Joseph Stalin's rise to power. The series climaxed with an edition about the Russian people, as distinct from the Soviet government.

The serial included more realistic narratives than was typical for the publication, and its imagery was frequently adapted from real photographs of historical events, Soviet leaders, and locations within the Soviet Union. It combined historical material about Soviet history presented with educational intent, with fictional and propagandistic elements such as Red Army soldiers plundering a church. It contained many factual inaccuracies. The creators intended their audience to feel sympathy for Soviet citizens, and depicted them as victims of communist rule. The serial highlighted the experiences of the Soviet periphery, and the 1956 Hungarian revolution received especial attention. It consistently minimized Soviet achievements that were sources of pride within Russia, such as the Soviet Union's role in World War II and the launching of Sputnik.

Scholar Alexandar Maxwell wrote that although This Godless Communism was a "strident example of Cold War propaganda", it depicted "ordinary Russians" in a markedly positive light, and explicitly described them as "our brothers in Christ". Eager to depict a contrast between Christianity and atheistic communism, the serial avoided depiction the oppression of Eastern European Jewry under both Nazism and Soviet rule, but unlike prominent earlier anti-Soviet propaganda, did not make use of antisemitic tropes in describing communist leaders. Commentators wrote that it differed from typical depictions of the Soviet Union in western media of the time to showcase ethnic and cultural diversity within the Soviet Union, though it frequently used inaccurate stereotypes to do so.

== See also ==
- Is This Tomorrow (1947)
