= Cincinnati Art Club =

- Formation: 1890
- Type: Artists' club
- Purpose: Advance the knowledge and love of art through education
- Headquarters: 1021 Parkside Pl, Cincinnati, OH 45202
- President: Christine Kuhr
- Website: http://www.cincinnatiartclub.com/

The Cincinnati Art Club was formed in 1890 and is one of the oldest continually operating groups or collectives of artists in the United States.

It was formed for the purpose of “advancing the knowledge and love of art through education.” The Club achieves its mission through exhibitions, lectures, hands-on demonstrations, sketch and painting group work sessions, monthly critique sessions, maintenance of an art library and awarding of student scholarships.

== History ==
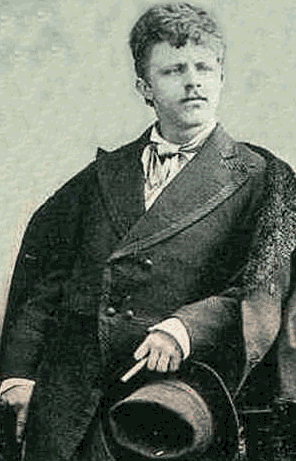
Frank Duveneck's presidency starting in 1896 is credited with attracting a large number of members to the club.

In the latter part of the 1800s a strong colony of working artists had established a small 'Montmartre' on the upper end of Vine Street in Cincinnati. One group of artists gathered informally as the Cincinnati Sketch Club and had its origins in the studio of John Rettig in 1883. The loose collection of artists became the Cincinnati Art Club on 15 March 1890. Its first president was John Rettig and consisted of 14 members (which included a pet dog so the membership number wasn't an unlucky 13). The founding members were: Rettig, Clarence D. Bartlett, James McLaughlin, Edward S. Butler, Matthew A. Daly, Albert O. Elzner, Edward Johnson, Remmington Lane, Leon van Loo, Lewis C. Lutz, William A. McCord, Perry Morris and Joseph Henry Sharp.

The club grew rapidly and within a year of its founding growing to 32 active members and 36 associate members.

Initially the club was bohemian in nature and did not have a fixed abode and met in the homes or studios of members. The host of the meeting would become the owner of all sketches made. In 1907, the club moved to a new home in the Harrison building and was considered the most attractive home to artists in the Middle West. A club house was eventually purchased in 1923 on Third Street.

A regular constitution was adopted in 1892 “to advance the knowledge and love of art through exhibitions of works of art, lectures on subjects pertaining to art, and to promote social intercourse amongst its members.”

The club became an advocate for artists and in 1908, the CAC President John Ritter submitted a letter which was presented at a congressional hearing on the arts tariff in Washington DC before the Ways and Means Committee.

The club was restricted to males until 1979 when women were allowed to become members.

== Notable members ==
- Wilbur G. Adam, club president - 1965–67, portraiture and landscapes painter.
- Frank Duveneck, club president - 1896–98. Cincinnati's best-known artist in the late 1800s and early 1900s, was appointed the club's critic.
- Henry Farny, club president - 1892–94, creator of the club's trademark, the dragonfly. A famed painter of American Indians.
- John Hauser, one of the club's earliest members. Painter best known for his portraits of American Indians and Indigenous peoples of the Americas.
- Charles S. Kaelin, an American Impressionist painter.
- Winsor McCay, an American cartoonist and animator.
- Lewis Henry Meakin, club president - 1912–14. An American Impressionist landscape artist.
- Frank Harmon Myers, Impressionist painter known for seascapes.
- Edward Henry Potthast, an American Impressionist painter.
- John A. Ruthven, an American wildlife painter.
- Joseph Henry Sharp, a painter of the American West.
- Leon Van Loo, the club's third and eighth president. Belgian-born photographer and art promoter.
- Raphael Strauss, a portrait painter, vice-president of the club

== Leadership ==
The club has had sixty-three presidents:

2023–present Christine Kuhr

2018–2023 Donald A. Schuster

2016–2018 Clark Stevens

2012–2016 Todd Channer

2010-2012 Tom Bluemlein

2008-2010 Kay Worz

2006-2008 Tim Boone

2003-2006 Mike McGuire

2001-2003 Lester W. Miley

1998-2001 David Klocke

1995-1998 Roger Heuck

1993-1995 Judith Q. Barnett

1990-1993 Thomas R. Eckley

1989-1990 Oren Miller

1987-1989 Lester W. Miley

1985-1987 Martha Weber

1983-1985 Sherman Peeno

1981-1983 Dale Benedict

1978-1981 Lou Austerman

1976-1978 Ray Loos

1974-1976 Gene Hinckley

1973-1974 Charles Baltzer

1971-1973 Don Dennis

1969-1971 Joseph E. Peter

1967-1969 George Stille

1965-1967 Wilbur G. Adam

1964-1965 Ray Becker

1963-1964 Jerome P. Costello

1961-1963 Mathias J. Noheimer

1959-1961 E. Kenneth Moore

1957-1959 George H. Strietmann

1955-1957 Frederic H. Kock

1953-1955 Vernon C. Rader

1951-1953 Joseph O. Emmett

1949-1951 Harland J. Johnson

1947-1949 Lawrence H. Smith

1945-1947 Merton W. Willmore

1943-1945 Maurice R. Rhoades

1941-1943 Norman H. Doane

1939-1941 Arthur L. Helwig

1937-1939 Julian J. Bechtold

1935-1937 Carl J. Zimmerman

1933-1935 Reginald L. Grooms

1929-1933 Theodore C. Dorl

1928-1929 Ernest Bruce Haswell

1927-1928 John E. Weis

1924-1927 Ernest Bruce Haswell

1922-1924 Herman H. Wessel

1920-1922 George Debereiner

1918-1920 Martin Rettig

1916-1918 James R. Hopkins

1914-1916 Paul Ashbrook

1912-1914 Theodore C. Dorl

1910-1912 Lewis Henry Meakin

1908-1910 John Rettig

1908 Henry F. Farny

1906-1908 W. F. Behrens

1904-1906 John Dee Wareham

1903-1904 Leon Van Loo

1902-1903 Paul Jones

1899-1902 John Ward Dunsmore

1898-1899 Clement Barnhorn

1896-1898 Frank Duveneck

1894-1896 Leon Van Loo

1892-1894 Henry F. Farny

1890-1892 John Rettig
