= Treasure Chest (comics) =

Catholic-oriented comic book series

Treasure Chest of Fun & Fact
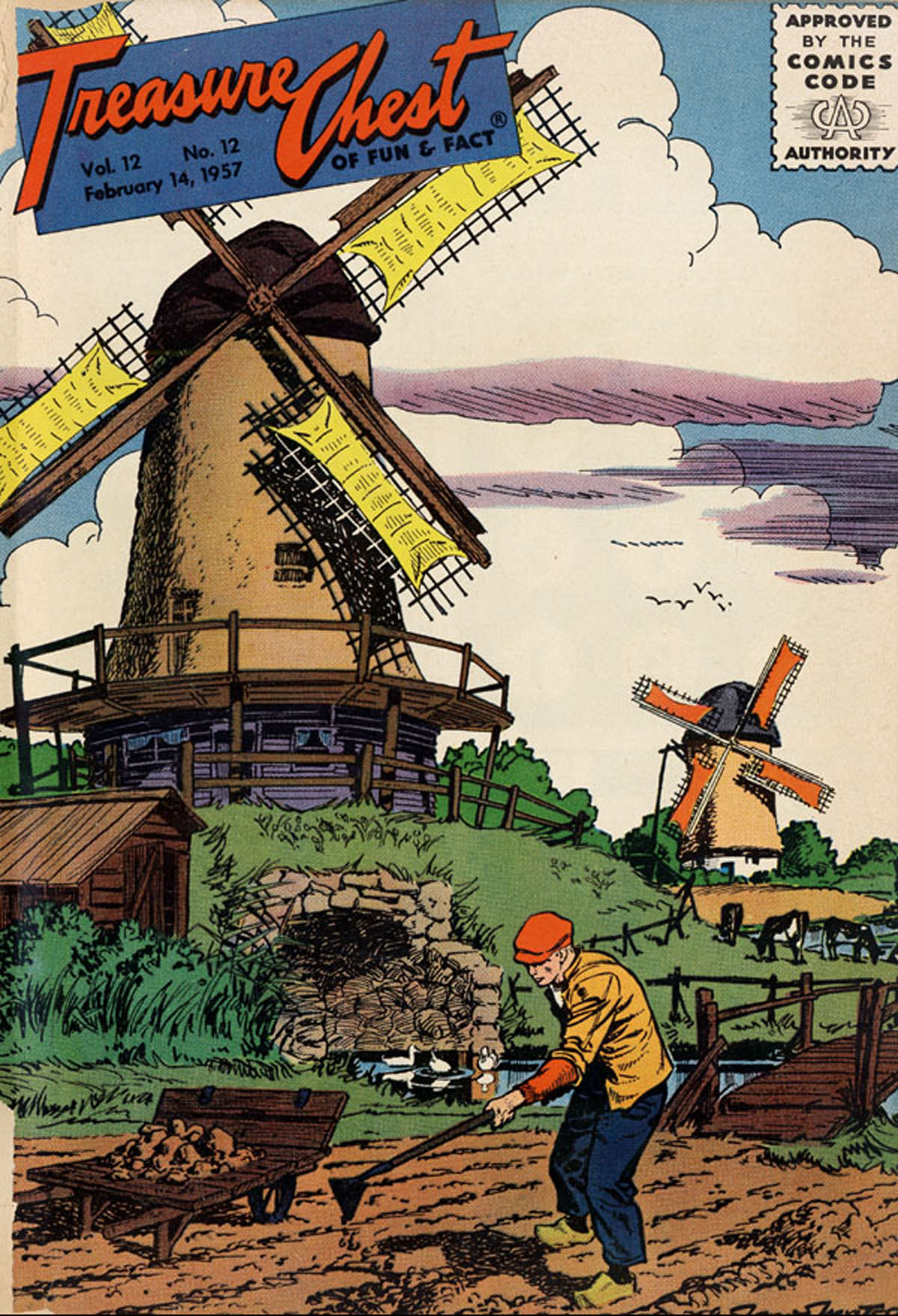
- Treasure Chest vol. 12, #12 (Feb. 14, 1957). Cover artist unknown

Publication information
- Publisher: George A. Pflaum
- Schedule: biweekly during school year, monthly during summer
- Publication date: 1946 - 1972
- No. of issues: 496 plus 12 summer issues

Creative team
- Written by: Various
- Artist: Various

Treasure Chest (full name for most of its run: Treasure Chest of Fun & Fact) was a Catholic-oriented comic book series created by Dayton, Ohio publisher George A. Pflaum and distributed in parochial schools from 1946 to 1972.

Its inspirational stories of sports and folk heroes, saints, school kids, Catholic living, history, science and similar topics were drawn by artists that included such prominent figures as EC's Reed Crandall, Graham Ingels and Joe Orlando, Marvel Comics' Joe Sinnott, and DC Comics' Murphy Anderson and Jim Mooney. Other features included literary adaptations and such typical comics fare as cartoon animal humor strips.

== Publication history ==
Created by Dayton, Ohio, publisher George A. Pflaum, who started Pflaum Publishing in 1885, and debuting March 12, 1946, as Treasure Chest of Fun & Facts, Treasure Chest was distributed in parochial schools and published biweekly throughout the school year until the 1960s, when it became monthly and doubled the number of pages. It was available solely by student subscription, and delivered in bulk to classrooms. Initially, the covers were of the same paper stock as the interiors; comic books' more typical slick covers were added in 1948. Six-issue summer editions were published in 1966 and 1967.

Beginning with Vol. 4, #1 (Sept. 7, 1948), the title changed to Treasure Chest of Fun & Fact, with the final word now singular. A source notes that with Vol. 23, #1 (Sept. 7, 1967), the title changed a final time, exchanging the ampersand for "and", although Vol. 21 No. 1 (Sept. 9, 1965) and featuring "The Champ is Back" as the cover story uses the ampersand in place of the word "and". Many very early issues were cover-titled simply Treasure Chest without the otherwise ubiquitous subhead.

Sometime during the 1960s, Treasure Chest began to be published by T.S. Dennison.

In 1964, a ten-part serial in Vol 19 #11-20 told the story of a presidential campaign vying for the nomination of fictional Governor of New York Timothy Pettigrew. The character's face was hidden throughout the series, and in the final chapter, it was revealed that Governor Pettigrew was black.

The final issue was dated July 1972.

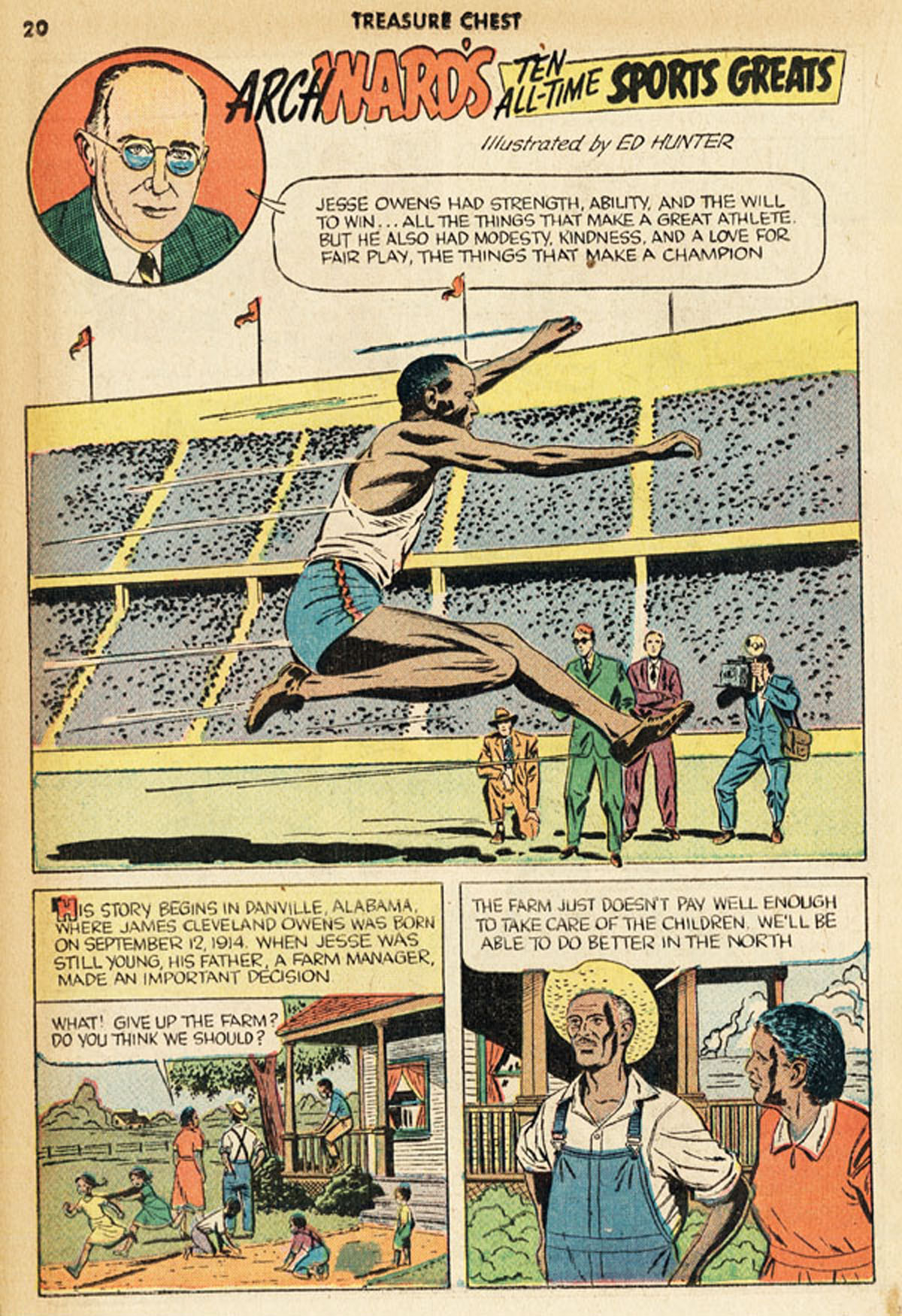
Jesse Owens biography by writer Arch Ward and artist Ed Hunter, Treasure Chest vol. 7, #20 (June 5, 1952)

Pflaum also published the magazines Junior Catholic Messenger, Our Little Messenger, and Young Catholic Messenger.

== Features and contributors ==
A long-running series, "Chuck White" (later "Chuck White & His Friends"), created by Capt. Frank Moss, featured the son of a mixed marriage, Catholic and Protestant, and even in its early days casually depicted such relatively daring concepts as racially integrated friendships. Series contributors after Moss included writer Max Pine and comic strip artists Frank Borth and, in the 1960s, Fran Matera.

A nonfiction historical feature about the Soviet Union, "This Godless Communism", drawn by Reed Crandall, debuted in vol. 17, #2 (Sept. 28, 1961) and appeared in every second issue through #20.

Others who worked on Treasure Chest included writer-editor Bob Wischmeyer, writers Ruth Barton, Frances E. Crandall, Helen L. Gillum, Arch Ward, and Berry Reece, and artists or writer-artists Wilbur G. Adam, Murphy Anderson, Bernard Baily, James O. Christiansen, Ed Hunter, Graham Ingels, E.A. Jurist (possibly comic-book writer Ed Jurist), Jim Mooney, Joe Orlando, Clara Elsene Peck, Bob Powell, Sid Quinn, Joe Sinnott, and Ozella Welch.
