= John Hauser (painter) =

American painter

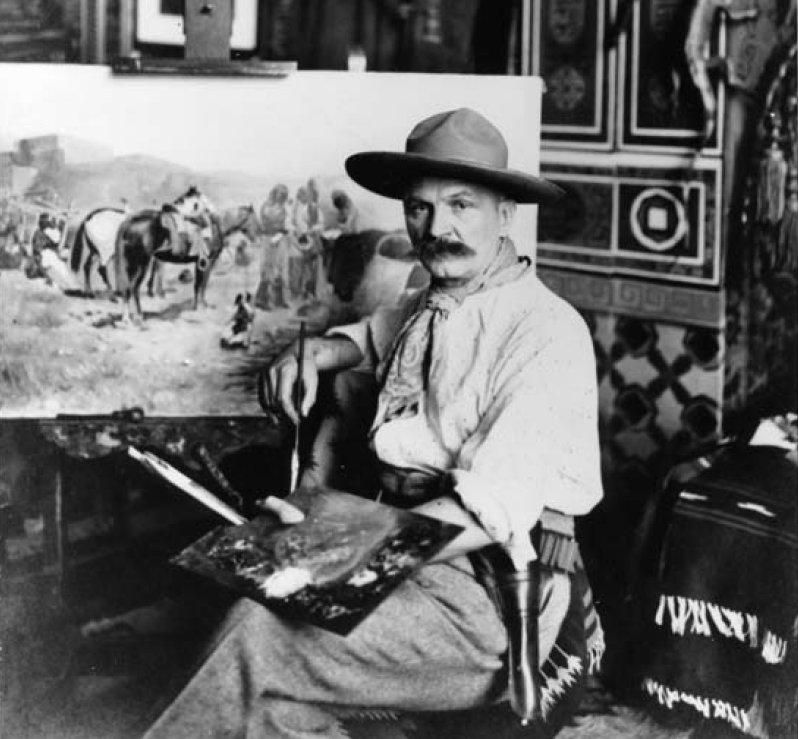
- Born: January 30, 1859; Cincinnati, Ohio, US
- Died: October 6, 1913 (aged 54); Cincinnati, Ohio, US
- Known for: Painting
- Spouse: Minnie Boltz Hauser
- Website: http://johnhauserproject.com/

John Hauser (January 30, 1859 – October 6, 1913) was an American painter best known for his portraits of Native Americans and depictions of various aspects of their lives. He had academic training at art schools in Europe, including the Royal Academy of Fine Arts in Munich. In the United States, he became fascinated with Native Americans of the Southwest and West, whom he painted for the rest of his life. In 1893 he traveled with the American artist Joseph Henry Sharp to Taos, New Mexico, and other areas of that and nearby states. He did so much work at the Pine Ridge Reservation in South Dakota that he and his wife were adopted by the Lakota Sioux as members of their nation.

== Early life and education ==
The son of German immigrants, Hauser was born in Cincinnati, Ohio, where he remained for his life. He received his early education in the Cincinnati public school system, and studied drawing at the Ohio Mechanics' Institute.

In 1873 he enrolled in the McMicken School of Design, where he studied under Thomas Satterwhite Noble. Hauser first studied in Europe in 1880, when he traveled to Munich, where he studied at the Royal Academy of Fine Arts. That year he completed his first documented painting, a portrait of the famed Indian scout and tracker "Lord Baltimore" (cf. Butch Cassidy and the Sundance Kid).

== Teaching ==
In 1883 he became a member of the Drawing Department of the Cincinnati Public Schools, a position he held until he withdrew in 1885 to sail for Europe.

== Europe ==
In 1885, in the company of another Cincinnati artist, Joseph Henry Sharp, he sailed to Germany, did some traveling, and enrolled in the Royal Academy of Fine Arts in Munich in October. After completing the program, Hauser continued his studies in Paris and Düsseldorf. He returned to Munich for additional study.

== Return to the United States ==
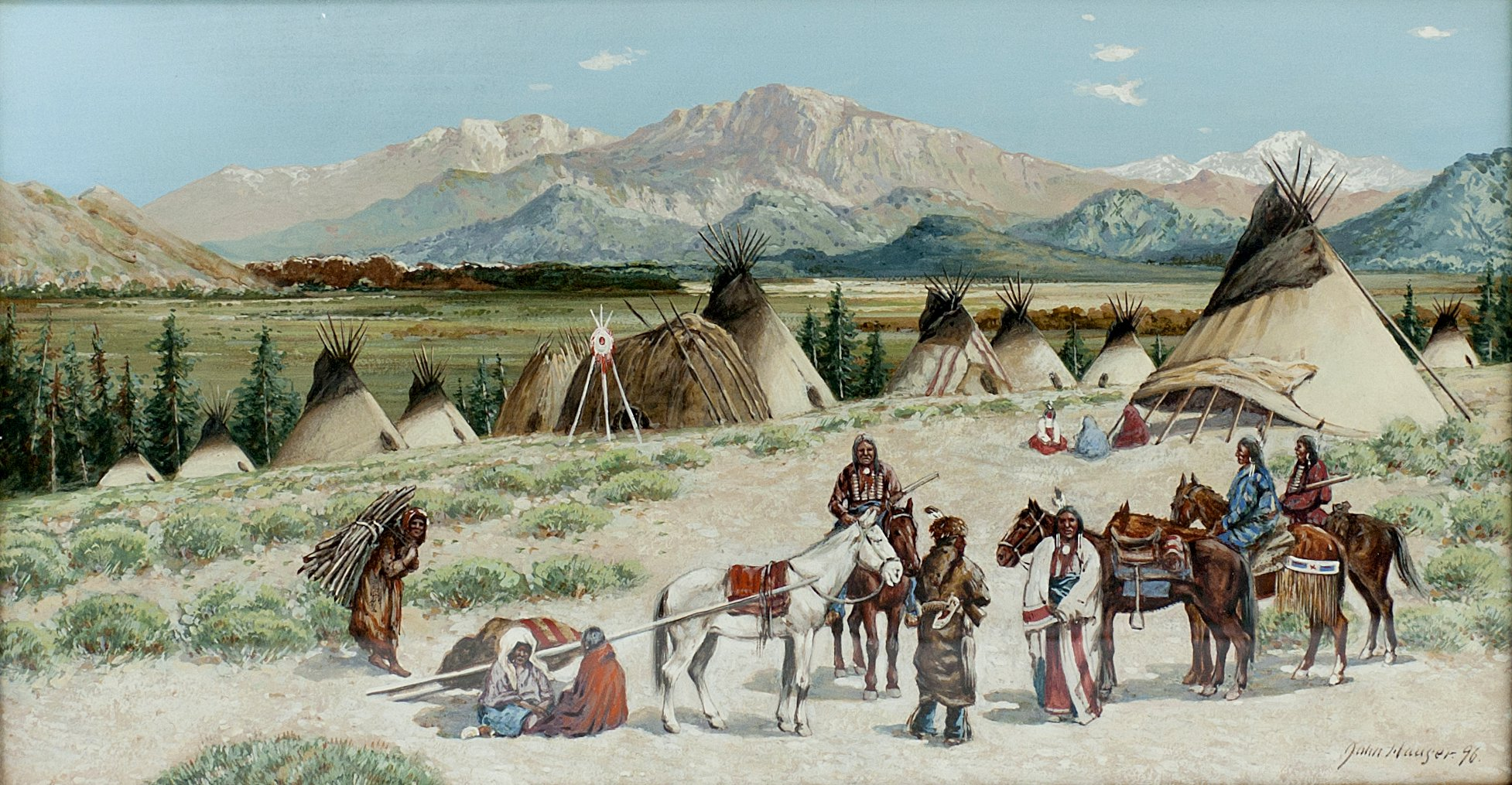
In the Foot Hills, 1896

Upon his return to Cincinnati, Hauser began to establish his reputation as an artist. In 1890 he became one of the early members of the Cincinnati Art Club. In 1891 he made his first trip to Arizona and New Mexico, which inspired his interest in portraying Native Americans in his paintings. In 1893 he traveled with John Henry Sharp to New Mexico and other areas of the Southwest. He had a lifelong enchantment with the American Indian and the West. Thereafter he traveled to Arizona, New Mexico, Colorado, Nebraska, Iowa, and South Dakota at every chance through 1908.

== Marriage and family ==
On July 8, 1896, Hauser married Minnie Boltz. They had no children. Minnie often traveled with him, and in 1901 John and Minnie were adopted by the Sioux nation, who named them in their language with the names meaning "Straight White Shield" and "Bring Us Sweets", respectively. John and Minnie Hauser spent considerable time on the Pine Ridge reservation, where they camped in a tent on the Sioux lands for six months a year between 1901 and 1905. When the couple built a home in the Clifton area of Cincinnati in 1904, they named it "Pine Ridge" to reflect their love of and respect for the Sioux.

== Career ==
Hauser painted hundreds of portraits of Native Americans, including Sitting Bull, Little Wound, Bald Face, Red Cloud, and countless others. Contemporary accounts comment on the realistic accuracy reflected in the portraits, and also in his portrayals of scenes from Indian life. His paintings of Indian life as he saw the villages and his Indian portraits are considered especially important for their authentic detail. He produced numerous paintings that tell a story, including his largest documented canvas, now in the collection of the Cincinnati Public Schools, which depicts the "Advance of Civilization".

== Legacy ==
The John Hauser Project has been established as a non-commercial effort to produce a catalogue raisonné of his works and a full biography of John Hauser.

== See also ==
- Frank Duveneck
