= E. Irving Couse =

American painter (1866–1936)

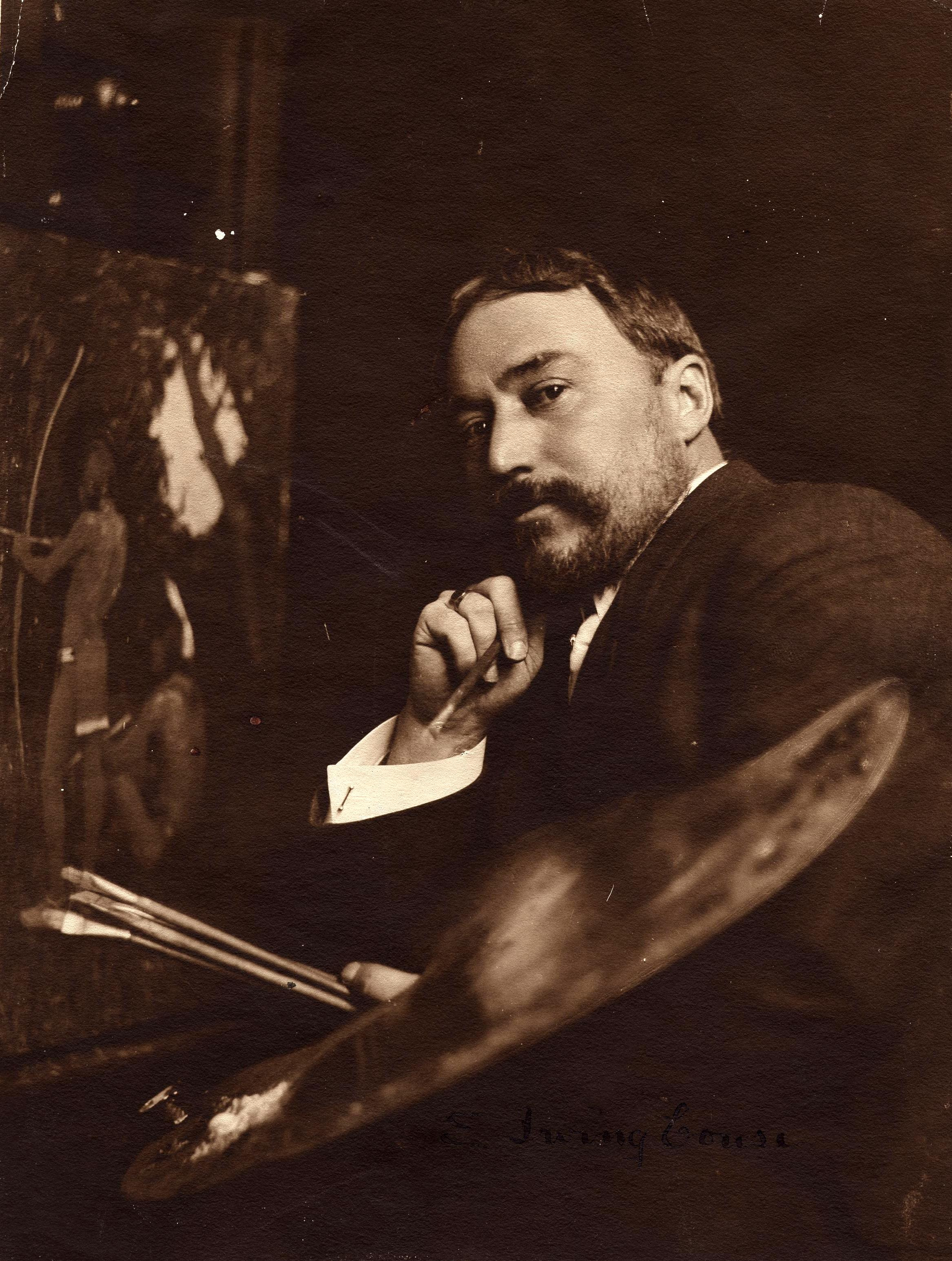
- Eanger Irving Couse
- Born: September 3, 1866; Saginaw, Michigan, U.S.
- Died: April 26, 1936 (aged 69); Albuquerque, New Mexico, U.S.
- Education: National Academy of Design
- Known for: Painting

Eanger Irving Couse (September 3, 1866 – April 26, 1936) was an American artist and a founding member and first president of the Taos Society of Artists. Born and reared in Saginaw, Michigan, he went to New York City and Paris to study art. While spending summers in Taos, New Mexico, he began to make the paintings of Native Americans, New Mexico, and the American Southwest for which he is best known. He later settled full time in Taos.

His house and studio in Taos have been preserved as the Eanger Irving Couse House and Studio—Joseph Henry Sharp Studios. The complex is listed on the National Register of Historic Places and the New Mexico Register of Cultural Properties. His work was also part of the art competitions at the 1928 Summer Olympics and the 1932 Summer Olympics.

== Early life and education ==
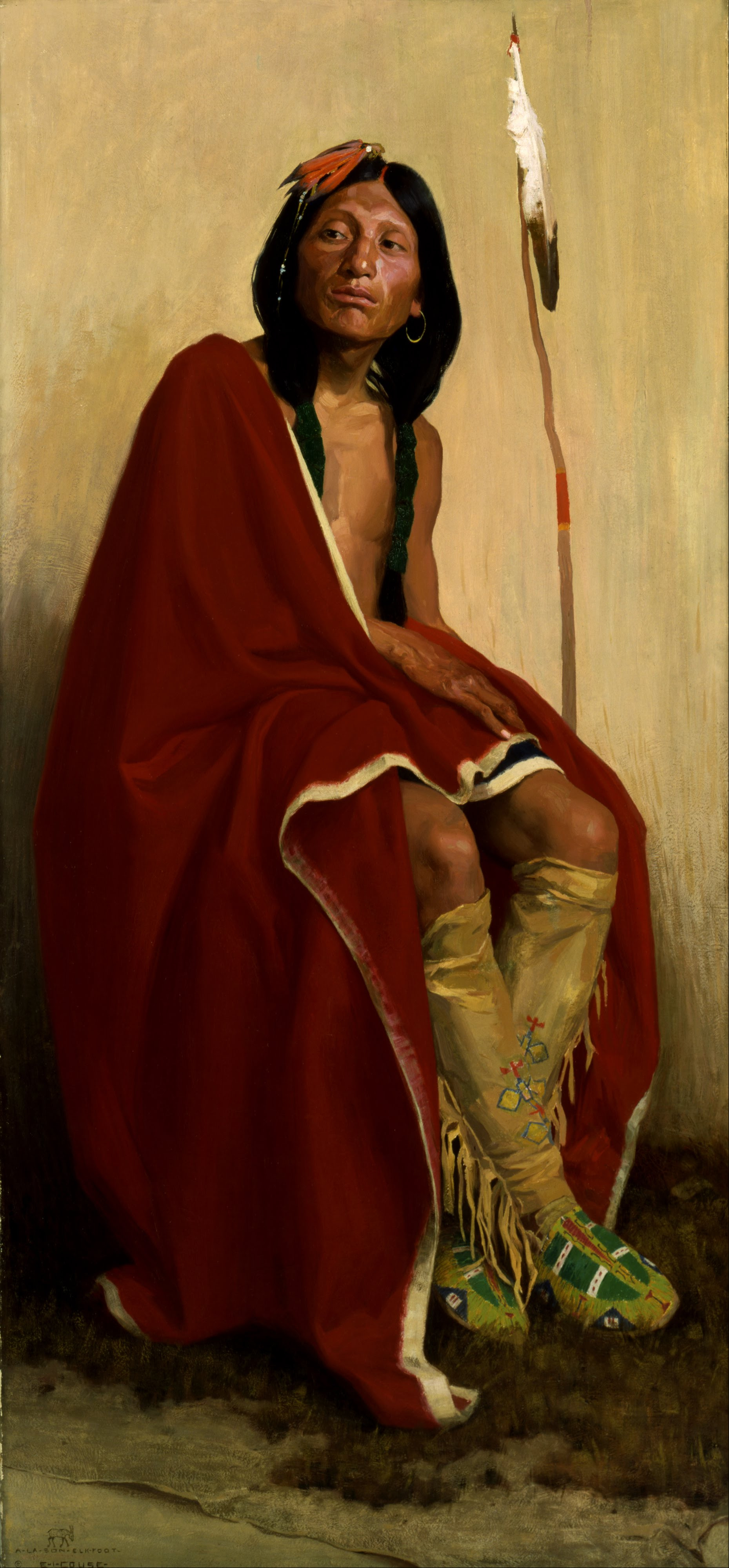
Elk-Foot of the Taos Tribe (1909)

Couse (pronounced to rhyme with "house") was born to a farming family in Saginaw, Michigan. As a boy, he started drawing members of the Chippewa tribe who lived nearby. He attended local schools as a child and continued to work at art.

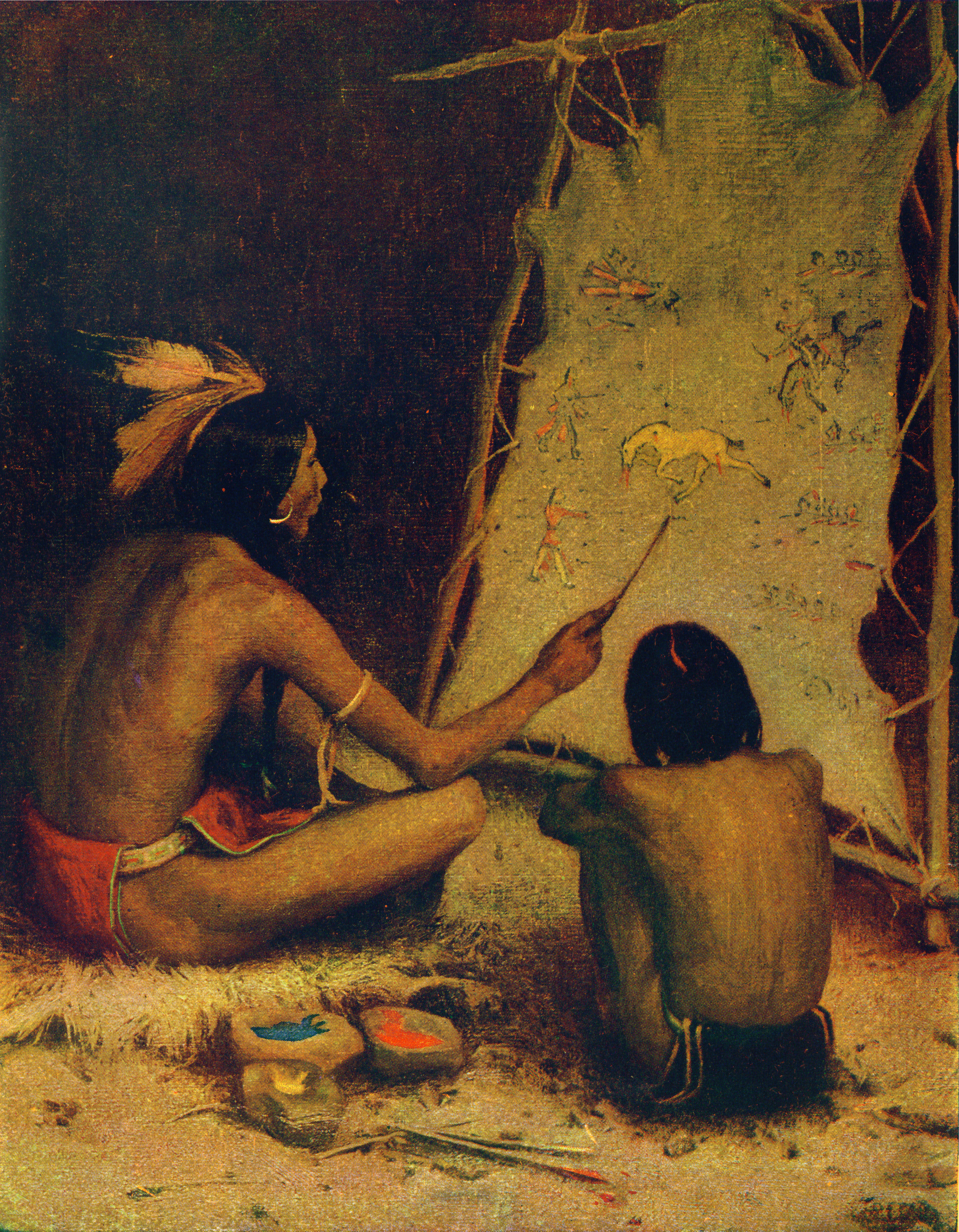
The Historian, by E. Irving Couse, painted in 1902

Couse left Michigan for professional art studies at the Art Institute of Chicago and the National Academy of Design, New York. He went to Paris, where he studied at the École des Beaux-Arts and Académie Julian under William-Adolphe Bouguereau. He lived in France for 10 years, painting mostly landscapes of the Normandy coast. Between 1893 and 1896, he lived at the Etaples art colony, where he painted its streets and fisher folk, including Coastal Scene, Etaples.

== Artistic career in the United States ==
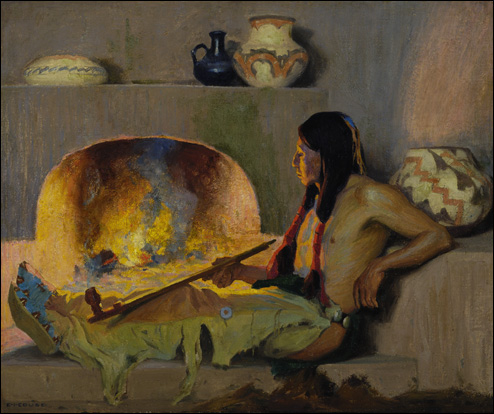
Couse contentment

After his return to the United States, Couse first lived in New York. He spent time in Taos, New Mexico during the summers. At the turn of the 19th century, the Southwest, and New Mexico in particular, attracted numerous artists and writers because it remained untouched by national expansion efforts dictated by the American policy of Manifest Destiny. The artists and writers of this era wanted to capture the last vestiges of the Old West before it disappeared altogether. During his time in New Mexico, Couse studied and painted the lives and culture of the Taos Indians, a Pueblo tribe. He began to show his paintings of Native American life and earned his first solo show in 1891.

In 1911 Couse was elected to the National Academy of Design. He also became active in the Taos art colony. In 1915, Couse was one of the six founding members of the Taos Society of Artists, and was elected first president. Another founding member was the artist J. H. Sharp, who adapted a chapel near Couse's house as a studio. Later Sharp built a combined house and studio on the land. The adjacent properties are recognized jointly as the Couse/Sharp Historic Site, and are preserved and operated by the Couse Foundation.

Among Couse's works in public galleries are Elk-Foot of the Taos Tribe (Smithsonian American Art Museum); Taos Pueblo - Moonlight (New Mexico Museum of Art); The Forest Camp (Brooklyn Museum of Art); The Pottery Maker (Two Red Roses Foundation); The Tom-Tom Maker (Lotos Club, New York); Medicine Fires (Montclair Gallery, New Jersey); and Shapanagons, a Chippewa Chief (Detroit Museum of Art).

Of these works, Elk-Foot of the Taos Tribe, painted in the summer of 1909, is considered Couse's masterwork. The painting was purchased for the United States national art collection by the well-known art collector William T. Evans and is now displayed in the collections of the Smithsonian American Art Museum. Elk-foot, whose anglicized name was Jerry Mirabal, began posing for Couse in 1907 and was one of the painters favorite subjects because of his "physical beauty and ideal features."

=== Early works ===
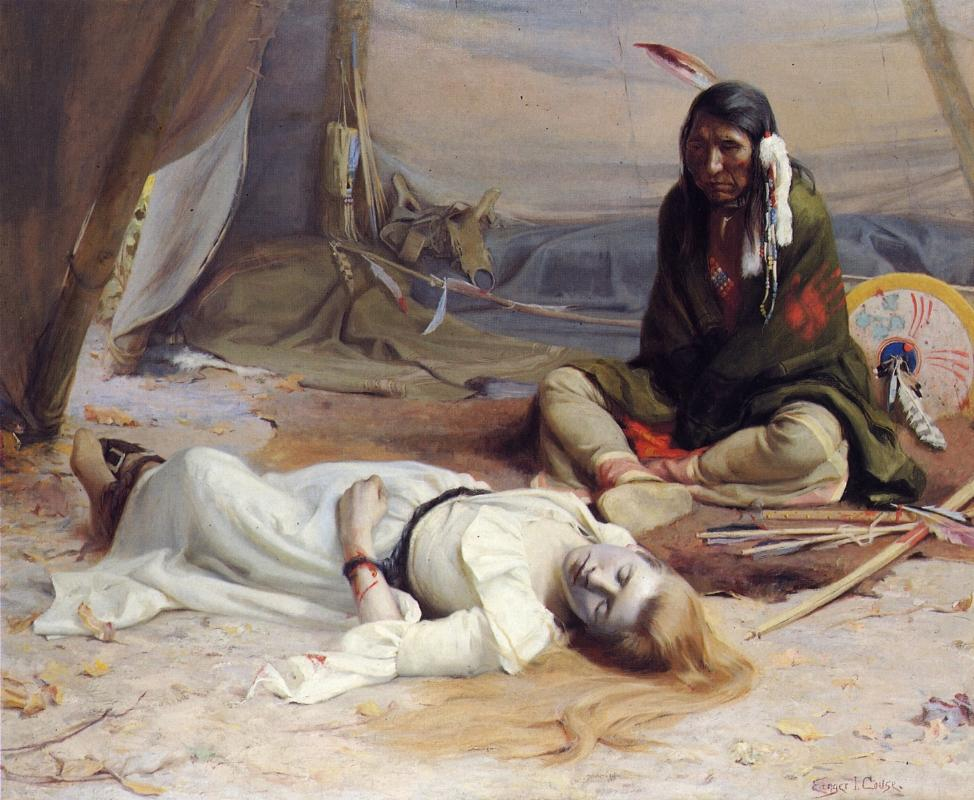
The Captive, a controversial work from 1891

Couse's The Captive was shown in 1891 at his first solo exhibition, held at the Portland Art Association in Oregon, and then at the Paris Salon of 1892. This large, "salon size" painting was the first Native American subject by Couse, who later achieved fame in the United States for his paintings of the indigenous peoples of New Mexico. In 1991, The Captive was included in the National Museum of American Art exhibition entitled The West as America, which created controversy by its curatorial interpretation of the artists' meanings and intents. Art historians have explored the painting's racial, sexual, and social motives in the context of American society at the time.

In 1899, Couse exhibited three paintings at the Boston Art Club: A Cayuse Indian (oil), Maternity (oil), and Yakima Encampment (oil). His address at that time was the Van Dyck Studios, 939 8th Avenue, New York City.

=== Later works ===
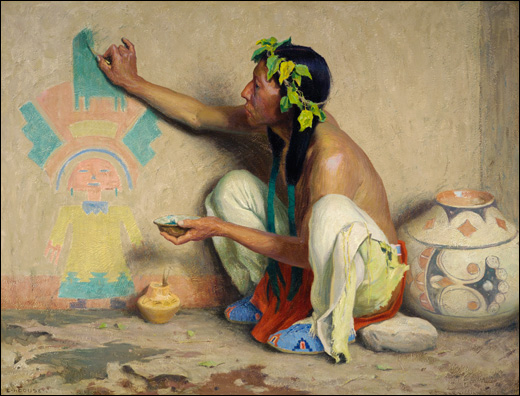
The Kachina Painter (1917)

- Mending the War Bonnet
- Making Pottery (awarded $500 National Academy of Design Carnegie Prize)
- Roasting Corn (1904)
- Rushing Water (1912)
- Twilight, Taos Pueblo (1913)
- Taos Canyon Camp
- Taos Pueblo - Moonlight (1914)
- The Kachina Painter (1917)
- The Quiver Maker (1918)

== Legacy and honors ==
His works won recognition and numerous awards from such institutions as the following: the Paris Salon, the Art Institute of Chicago, the National Academy of Design (Second Hallgarten Prize, 1900; First Hallgarten Prize, 1902; Altman Prize, 1916); and the Salmagundi Club (Isidor prize, 1917). He was awarded the Lippincott prize from the Pennsylvania Academy of the Fine Arts in Philadelphia (1921). He received awards from the American Exposition, Buffalo; the Boston Art Club, the Corcoran Gallery, and the Panama Pacific International Exposition in San Francisco (silver medal, 1915). His works are held in many museums in the United States and around the world, including a collection from David and Peggy Rockefeller, now in the Museum of Fine Arts, Boston.

Two buildings he used as studios are part of the Eanger Irving Couse House and Studio—Joseph Henry Sharp Studios listed on the National Register of Historic Places and the New Mexico Register of Cultural Properties. This is one of 30 sites recognized as an "Historic Artist's Home and Studio Associate Site" by the National Trust for Historic Preservation. In 2001 the Couse Foundation was formed to restore and preserve the properties. It operates the historic site of the two artists and offers scheduled tours.

== Paintings ==
- The Bird Jar
- The Captive (1891), Phoenix Art Museum
- The Housewife Looking at the Fisherman's Catch
- In Ambush
- Love Song (aka Moonlight)
- The Medicine Maker
- Pottery Vendor (1916)
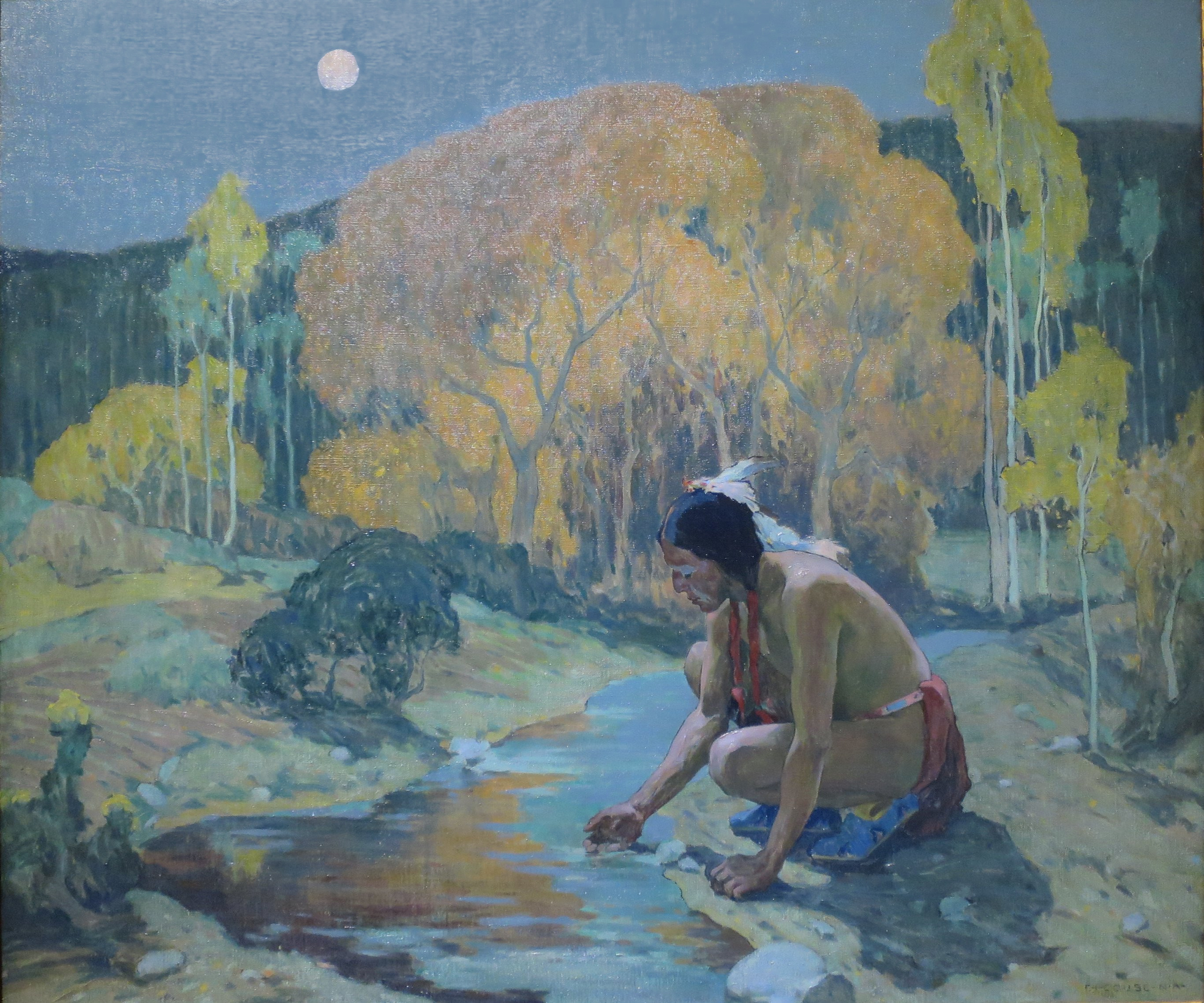
Autumn Moon

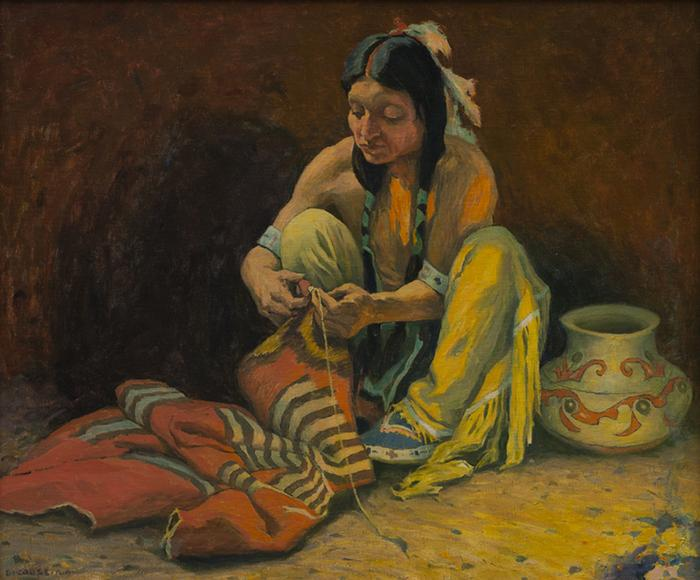
The Blanket Mender

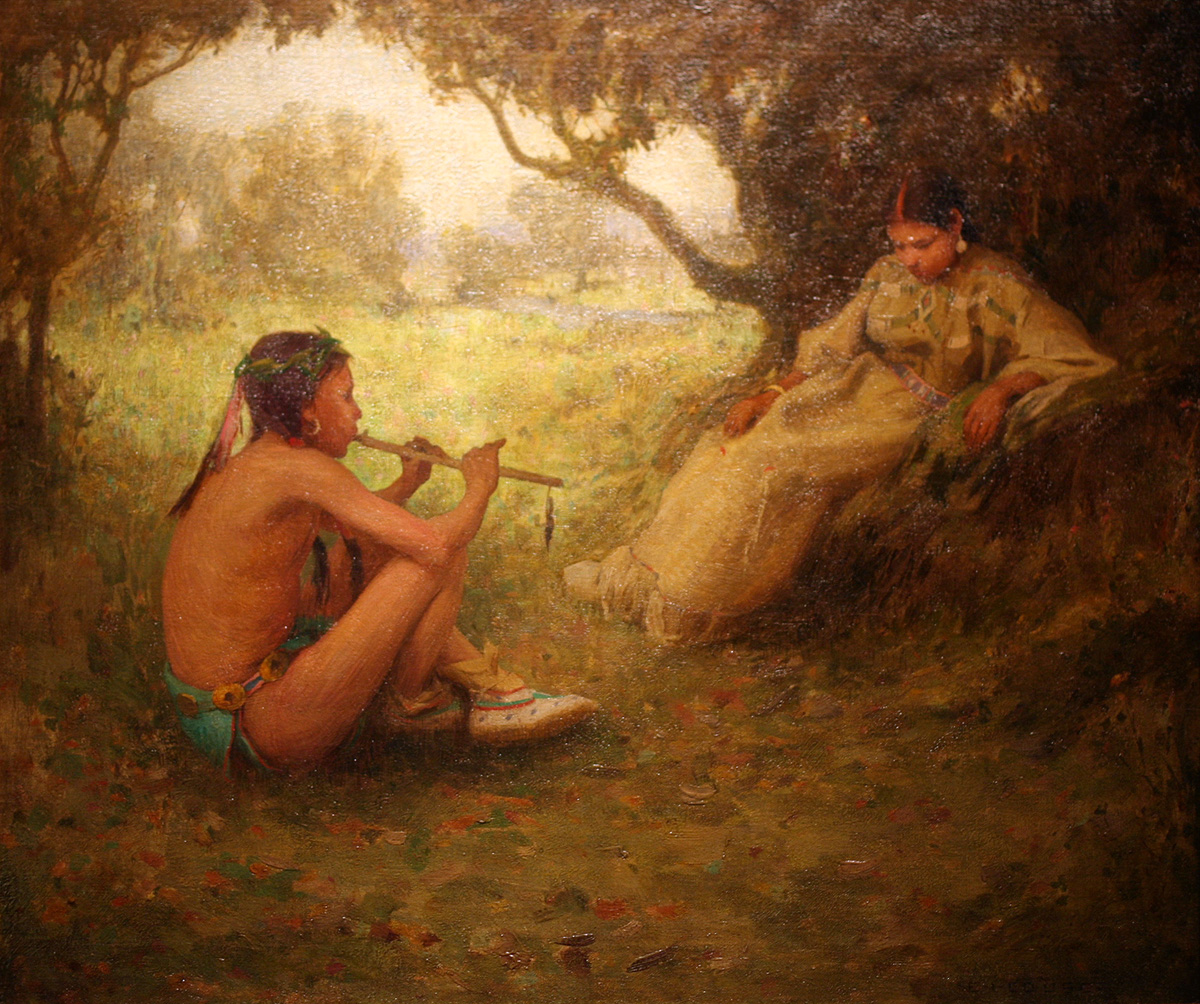
Indian Love Song

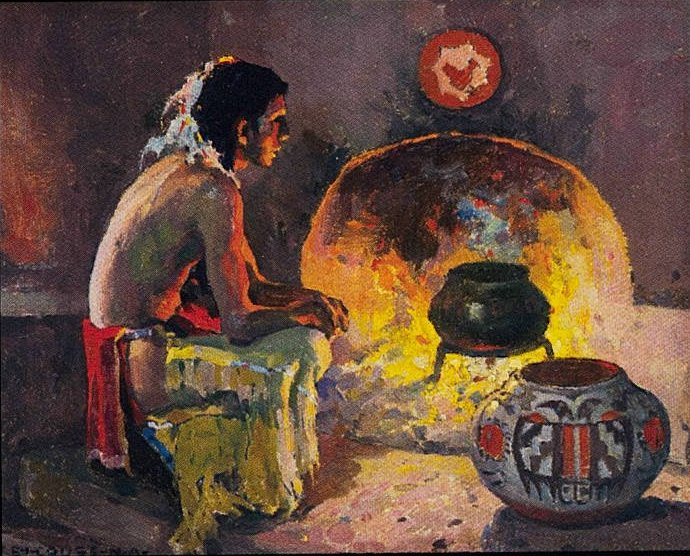
Firelight

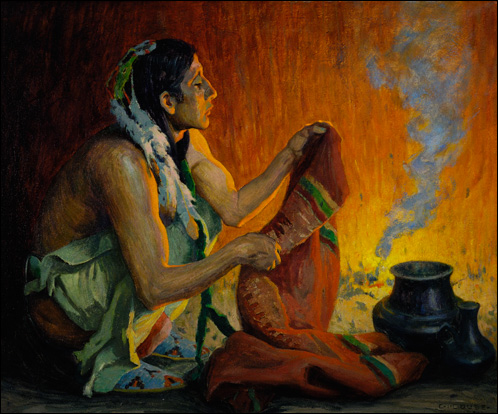
Smokeceremony

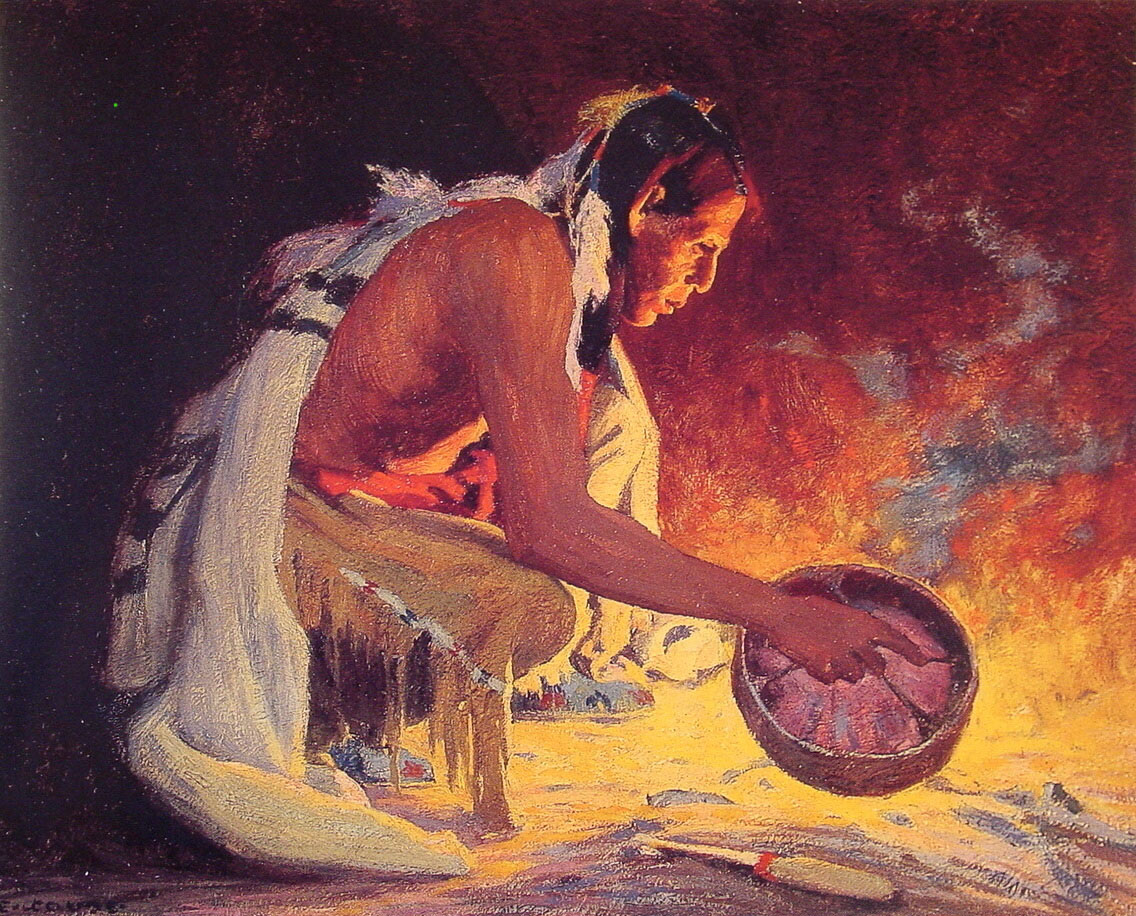
Indian by Firelight

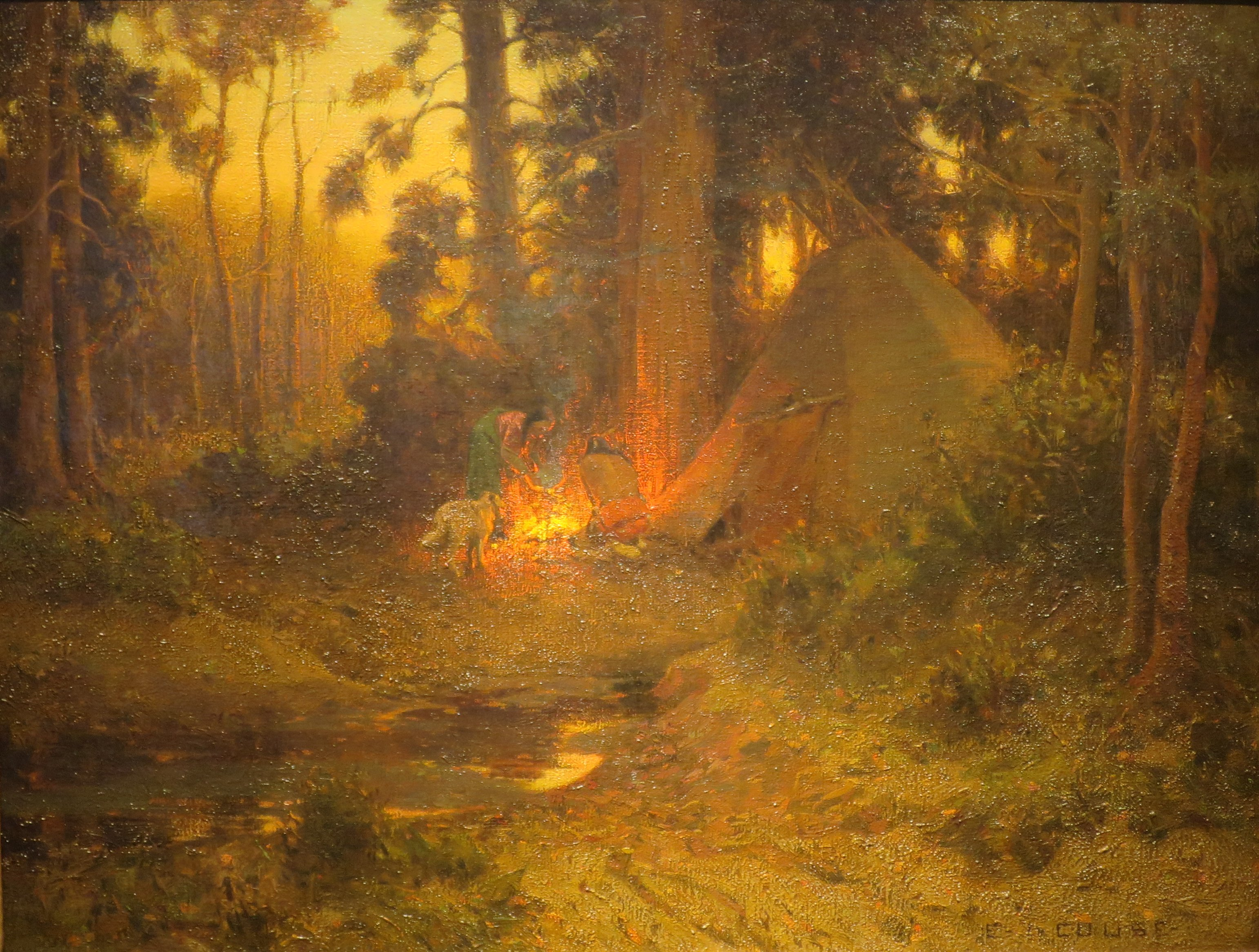
Indian Camp in the Cascade Mountains

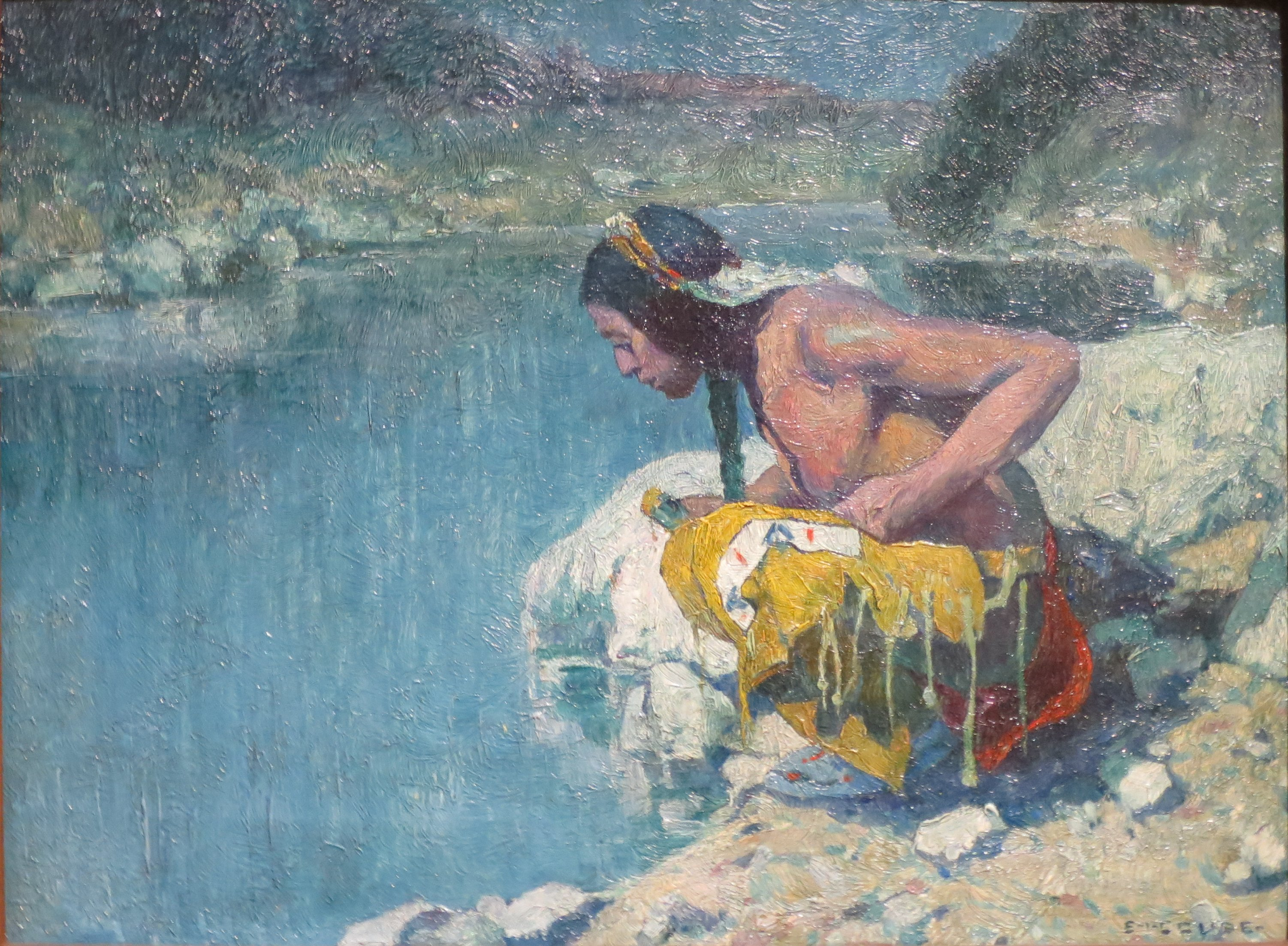
Indian at Sacred Lake

== Death ==
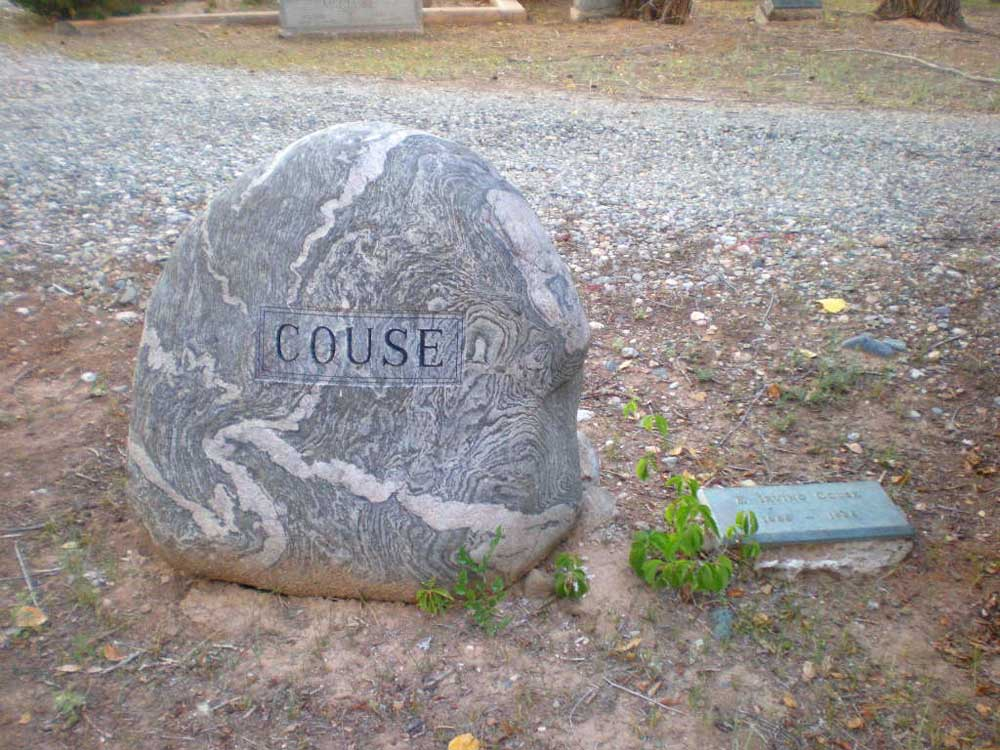
Couse's marker at Sierra View Cemetery

Couse died in Albuquerque, New Mexico in 1936 at the age of 69. He is buried at Sierra View Cemetery in Taos.
