= Elk-Foot of the Taos Tribe =

Painting by E. Irving Couse

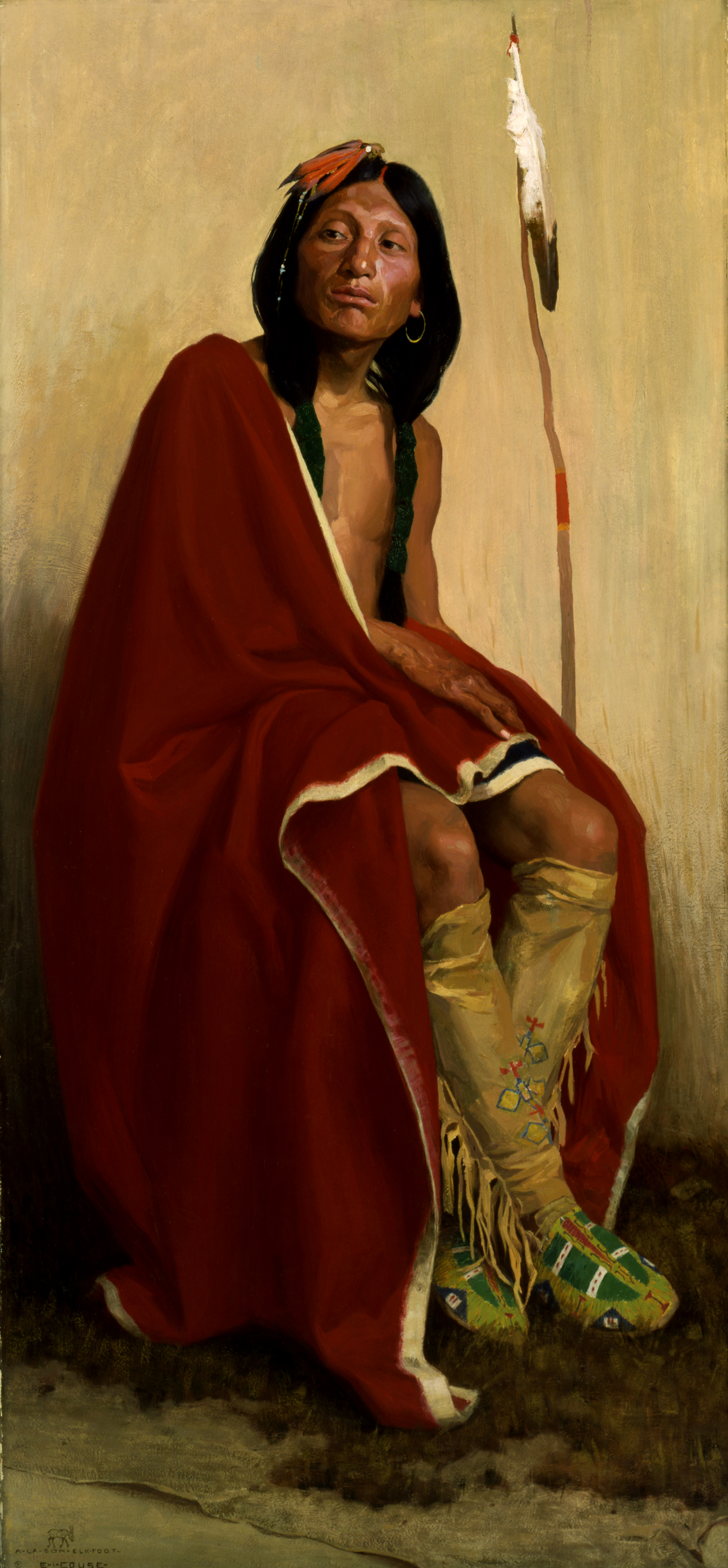
- Artist: E. Irving Couse
- Year: 1909
- Dimensions: 198.755 cm × 92.3925 cm × 92.39 cm (78.250 in × 78.25 in × 36.375 in)
- Location: Smithsonian American Art Museum, Washington, D.C.
- Accession: 1910.9.5

Elk-Foot of the Taos Tribe is a 1909 painting which is considered to be the masterwork of E. Irving Couse.

== History ==
The painting was purchased for the United States national art collection by the well-known art collector William T. Evans and is now displayed in the collections of the Smithsonian American Art Museum.

== Description ==
The painting measures 78 1/4 x 36 3/8 in. (198.6 x 92.4 cm.)

Elk-foot, whose anglicized name was Jerry Mirabal, began posing for Couse in 1907 and was one of the painter's favorite subjects because of his "physical beauty and ideal features."

The painting seems inaccurate, however. A coup stick would be carried by North Americans, but not by the Taos tribe. The blanket Elk-Foot wears is from England, and his moccasins were from Couse's studio, and weren't used during the Taos period.
