= Leon Van Loo =

American photographer and art promoter

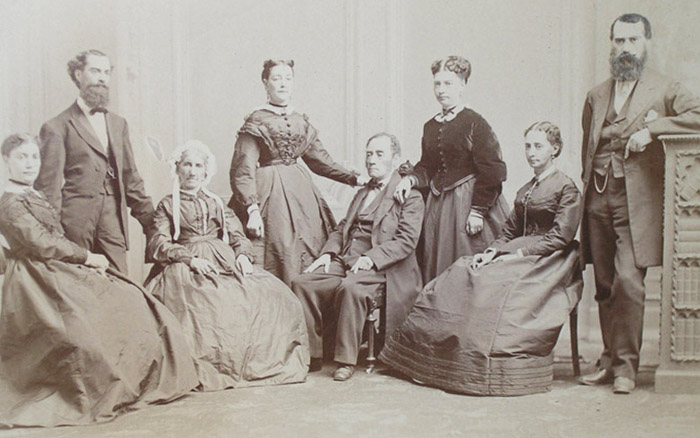
Van Loo's photograph of the Workum family, possibly from the 1860s

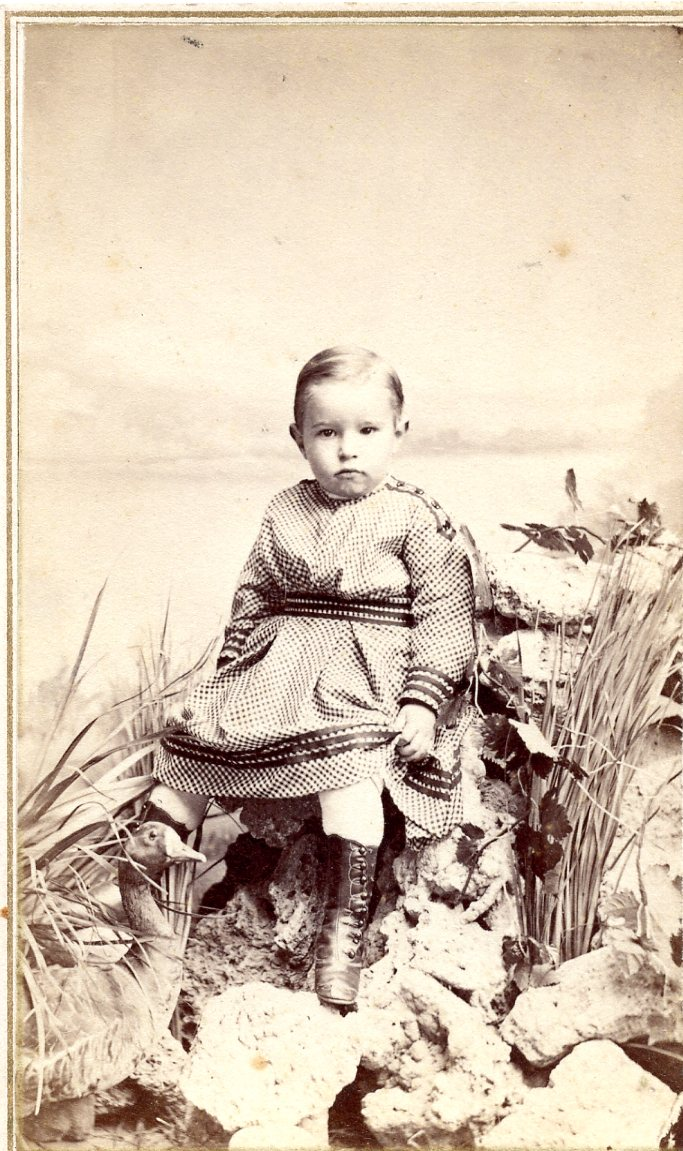
Van Loo's carte de visite of a small boy

Leon Van Loo (1841–1907) was an American photographer and art promoter.

Born 12 August 1841, in Ghent, Belgium, he moved to Cincinnati, Ohio in 1858, when he opened a photography gallery. After doing well in the cotton trade after the Civil War, he retired early in 1866. He subsequently spent time travelling to Europe and collecting art, which he displayed in Cincinnati.

He took the first portrait photograph of Ulysses S. Grant after Grant was given command of the Union army during the American Civil War.

In 1875, he introduced a new kind of photography he called "ideal." Photographs using this technique are printed on zinc oxide applied to blackened sheet-iron and present a pearly, transparent surface.

In 1890, he was a founding member of the Cincinnati Art Club and served as president from 1894 to 1896 and 1903–1904.

He made much of his wealth from cotton speculation.

Van Loo died on 10 January 1907.
