= American Heritage Center =

Archive at the University of Wyoming

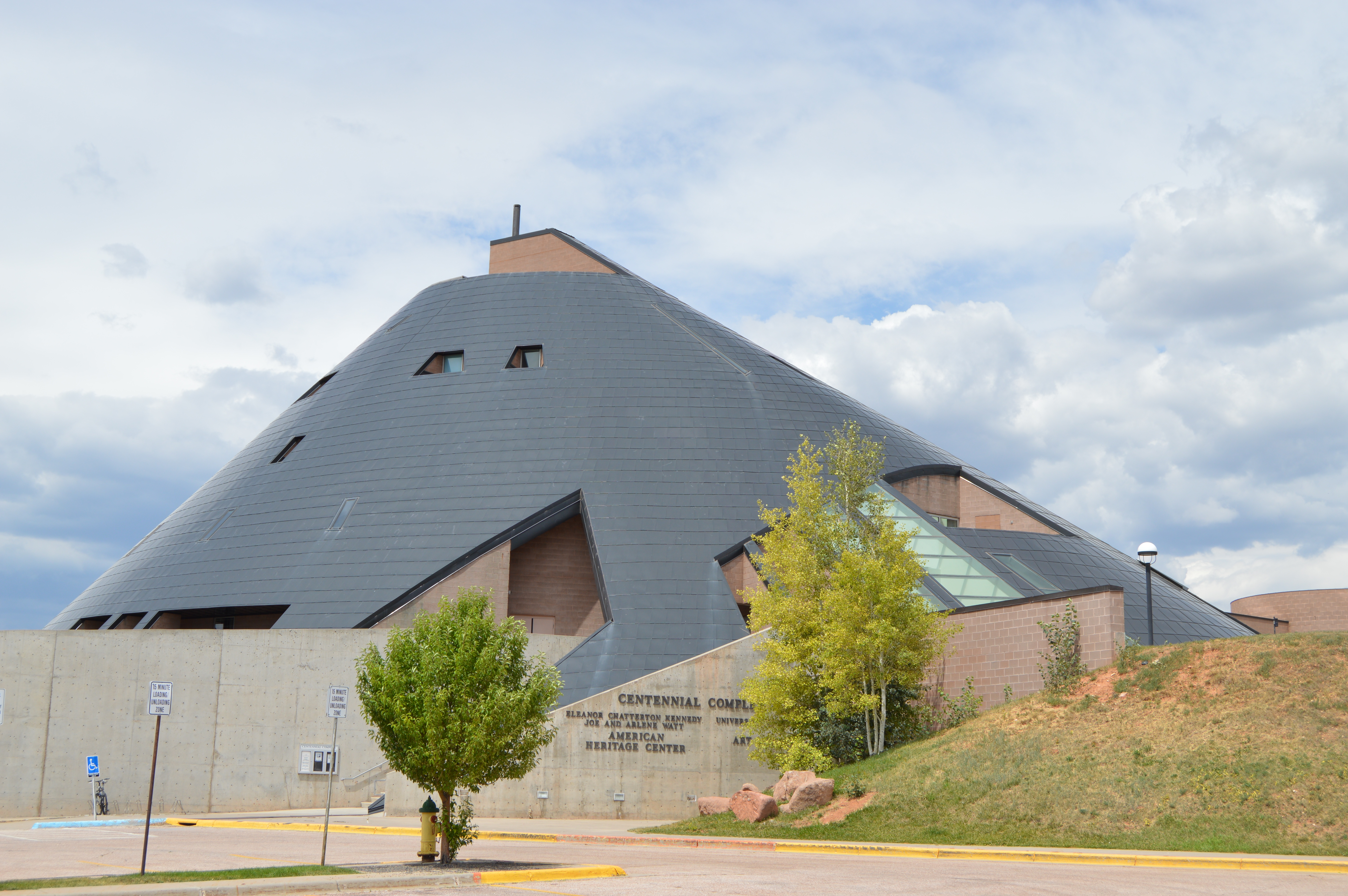
- American Heritage Center
- 41.3147672792741°N 105.56704655447325°W
- Location: Laramie, Wyoming, United States
- Type: academic library
- Established: 1945; 81 years ago

Other information
- Affiliation: University of Wyoming
- Website: www.uwyo.edu/ahc/

The American Heritage Center is the University of Wyoming's repository of manuscripts, rare books, and the university archives. Located in Laramie, Wyoming, United States, its collections focus on Wyoming and the Rocky Mountain West (including politics, settlement, Native Americans, and Western trails) and a select handful of national topics: environment and conservation, the mining and petroleum industries, air and rail transportation, popular entertainment (particularly radio, television, film, and popular music), journalism, US military history, and book history.

== Usage ==
Students and scholars from around the globe use these collections for research. In one recent year, researchers traveled from 45 states and 12 countries. The AHC also sponsors a wide range of scholarly and popular programs including lectures, symposia, and exhibits. Housed in the Centennial Complex on the campus’ east side, access to the AHC is free and open to all.

== Description ==
Established in 1945, the AHC holds more than 90,000 cubic feet (roughly 17 miles of cubic-foot increments) of collection material as of 2020 and over 50,000 rare books.

The Center annually receives between six and seven thousand researchers and provides fellowships and travel grants for research. It administers a teaching and research grant program to fund University of Wyoming faculty who wish to develop new courses based on primary sources in the AHC. The Center has an active outreach program to reach undergraduates and students in grades 6-12, organizing and hosting the Wyoming History Day program, which is tied to the National History Day.

The Toppan Library at the American Heritage Center holds the University's rare book collection. The collection documents the history of the book, from medieval manuscripts to modern printed books.

== Location ==
Along with the University of Wyoming Art Museum, the AHC is located in the Centennial Complex. Named for the University of Wyoming’s centennial anniversary (1986) and designed by internationally acclaimed architect Antoine Predock, the Centennial Complex opened to the public in 1993.
