= Embudo Creek =

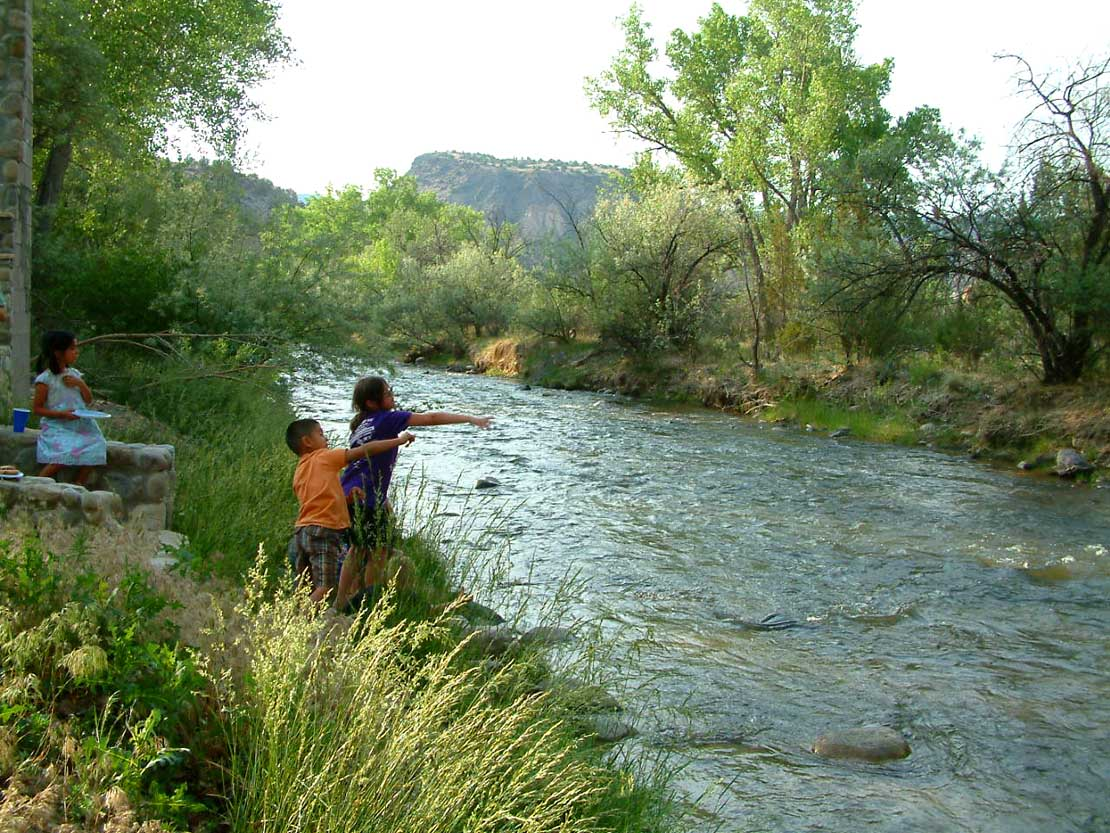
- The mesas from which the name is derived can be seen in the background.

- Location of mouth

Location
- Country: United States
- State: New Mexico

Physical characteristics
- Source
  - location: North Truchas Peak
  - elevation: 13,024 ft (3,970 m)
- Mouth
  - location: Embudo
  - coordinates: 36°12′56″N 105°55′08″W
  - elevation: 5,800 ft (1,800 m)
- Basin size: 305 sq mi (790 km^{2})
- Discharge
  - location: Dixon
  - average: 80.3 cfs (1924-2013)
  - minimum: 12.8 cfs (1951)
  - maximum: 235 cfs (1941)

Basin features
- River system: Rio Grande
- Tributaries
  - left: Rio de las Trampas

Embudo Creek, also known as Rio Embudo, is formed by the confluence of the Rio Pueblo and Santa Barbara Creek near Peñasco in Taos County, New Mexico. The Embudo (named after the Spanish word meaning “funnel”) empties into the Rio Grande near the community of Embudo between two distinctively shaped buttes, thus creating a funnel effect. Before emptying into the Rio Grande the river flows through Dixon in Rio Arriba County. Irrigation canals (acequias) built in the 19th century to divert water from the headwaters of Embudo Creek are a continuing source of controversy.

== Geography ==
The origins of Embudo Creek are in headwaters streams, the Rio Pueblo, Rio Santa Barbara, and Rio de los Trampas near North Truchas Peak,13,024 ft (3,970 m), Jicarita Peak, 12,835 ft (3,912 m), and Trampas Peak, 12,172 ft (3,710 m), in the southern Sangre de Cristo Mountains. The headwaters of the Truchas and Santa Barbara rivers are in the Pecos Wilderness. All the rivers flow northwest and the Pueblo and Santa Barbara unite at Picuris Pueblo. The river below their union is called Embudo Creek. The Las Trampas joins the Embudo further downstream. The watershed of the Embubo and its tributaries is 28 miles (45 km) east to west and a maximum of 16 miles (26 km) north to south. The length of the Embudo from the junction of the Pueblo and Santa Barbara rivers to where the Embudo joins the Rio Grande is about 9 miles (14 km). The elevation of the Embudo where it joins the Rio Grande is about 5,800 ft (1,800 m).

Most of the Embudo watershed is located in Taos County but it laps over into Rio Arriba County. The area of the watershed is 305 sq mi (790 km^{2}). No incorporated towns or cities are in the watershed, but there are several communities: Dixon, Trampas, Peñasco, and the Picurus Pueblo are the largest. Irrigated agriculture is extensive around these communities.

== Water disputes and acequias ==
Settlers on the Mora grant have constructed gravity-fed irrigation ditches (acequias) to divert water from three headwaters feeder streams into the Rio Pueblo on the western side of the Sangre de Cristos to the Mora River on the eastern side. The Rio Pueblo is an upstream source of Embudo Creek (and not the same as the Rio Pueblo de Taos) The first diversion of water from Alamitos Creek was built about 1820; the second diversion from the Rito de la Presa was built in 1864; and the third and largest diversion was from the Rito Angostura. This diversion via acequias took 20 families three years to construct from 1879 to 1882. The acequia was 8 mi (13 km) long and "constructed without the benefit of sophisticated tools and engineering know-how, accomplishing the seemingly impossible task" of bringing water from one side of the mountains to the other. In drought years as much as one-half of the water of the Rio Pueblo is diverted to Mora County. In 2021, that water irrigated about 1,900 acres (770 ha) of agricultural land owned by 143 users.

The transfer of water was controversial. The Picuris Pueblo contested the diversion of water from their territory to the Mora River as early as the 1860s and pursued a lawsuit against the diversions of water in the 1880s. The suit was dismissed as no attorney would take the case. Disputes about water continued into the 21st century. In 2021, unidentified persons blocked the acequia directing water from Alamitos Creek with a mound of rocks and interrupted the flow of water to Mora Country. The blockage was quickly removed, but the dispute over water rights continued.

== Gallery ==
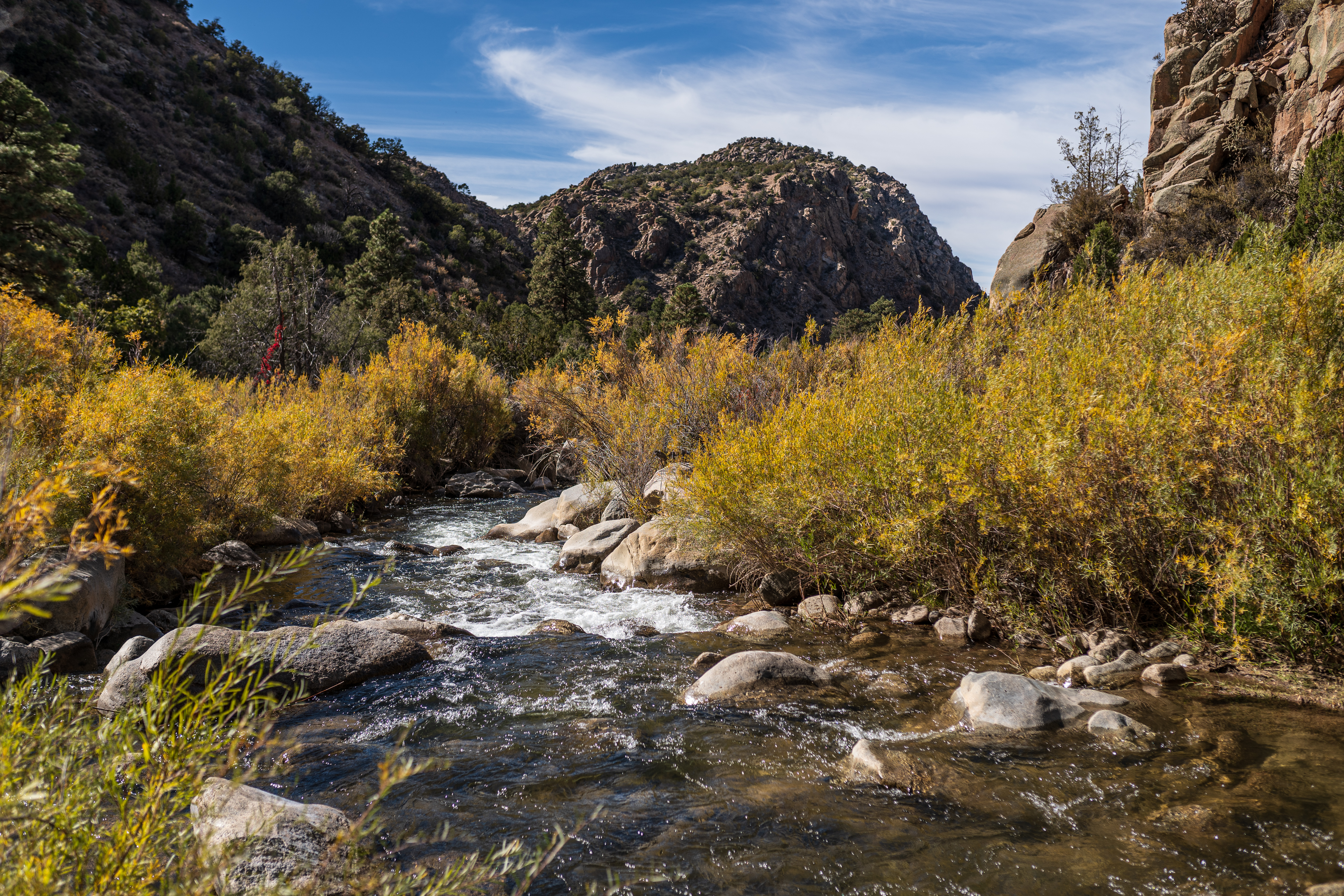
The Rio Embudo passing through the box canyon that bears its name.

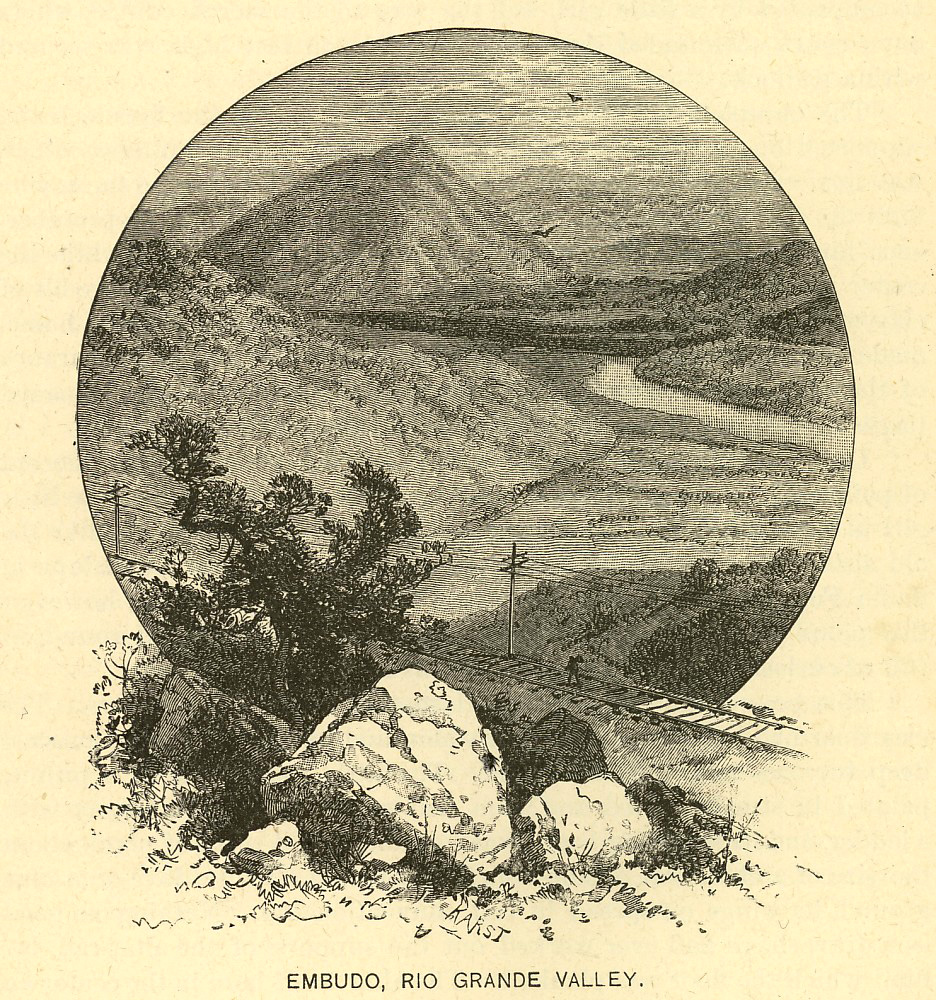
View of the mesa in 1885

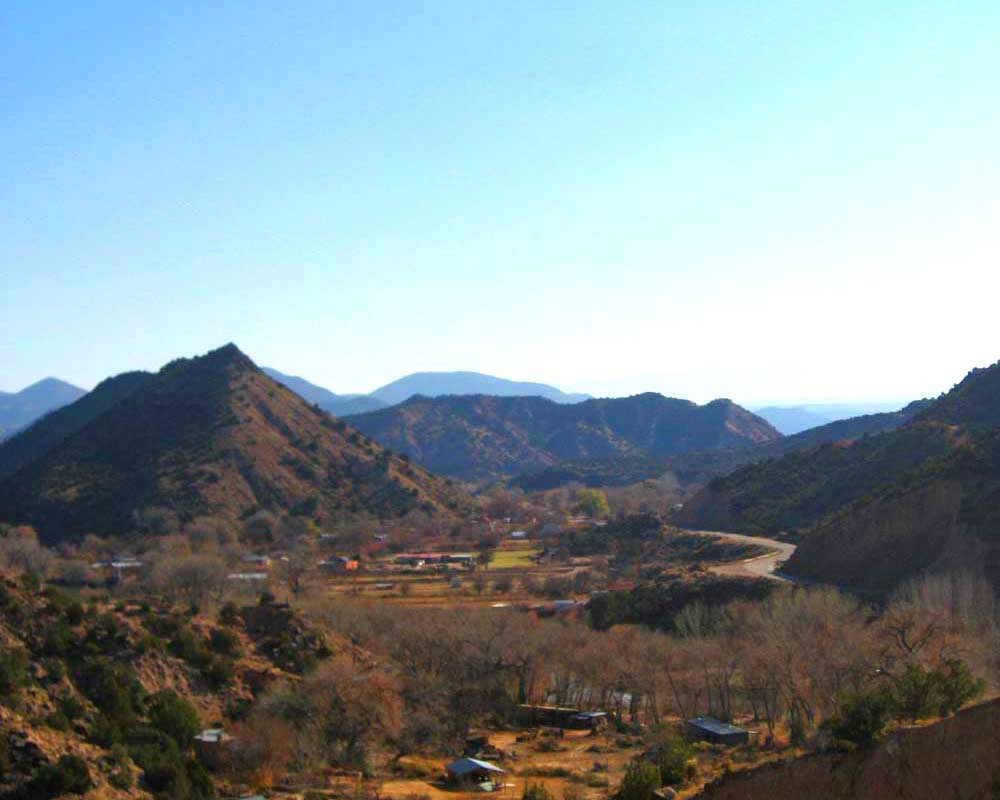
similar view ca. 2008

== See also ==
- Las Trampas Land Grant
- List of rivers of New Mexico
- Mora Land Grant
