= Rio Ruidoso =

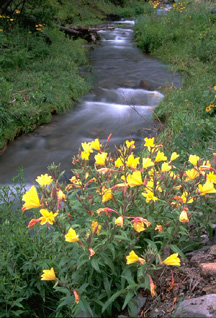
- Rio Ruidoso

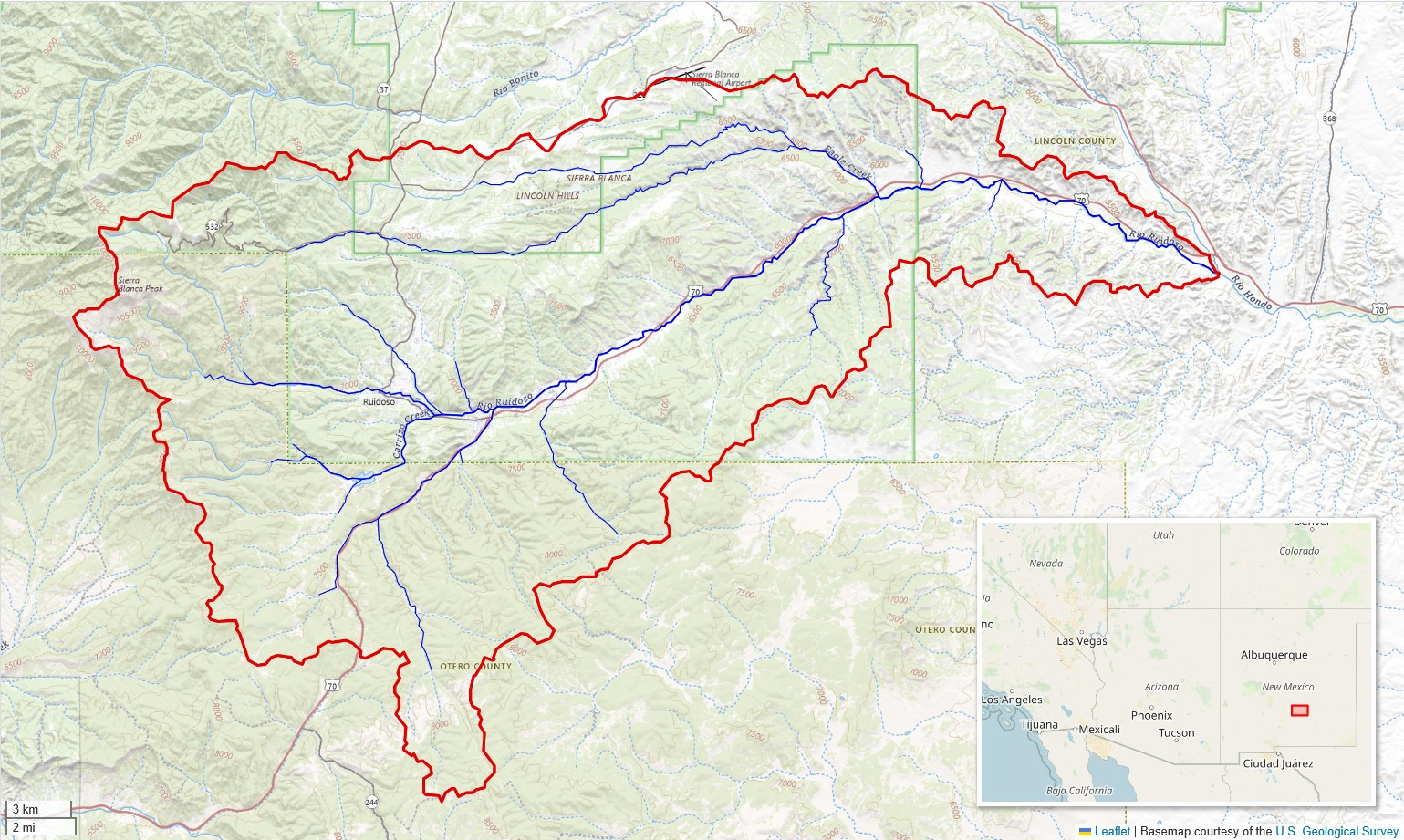
- Ruidoso River watershed (Interactive map)
- Etymology: Noisy River

Location
- Country: United States
- State: New Mexico
- Counties: Lincoln

Physical characteristics
- Source: Sierra Blanca Mountains
  - location: Lincoln County
  - coordinates: 33°20′13″N 105°44′38″W
  - elevation: 2,260 m (7,410 ft)
- Mouth: Rio Hondo (Southern New Mexico)
  - location: Hondo, New Mexico
  - coordinates: 33°22′54″N 105°16′17″W
  - elevation: 1,615 m (5,299 ft)

The Rio Ruidoso is a 30-mile (48 km) long river located in the Sierra Blanca and Sacramento Mountains in Lincoln County and Otero County, New Mexico in the United States and is part of the Rio Ruidoso Watershed. The Spanish term, río ruidoso, translated into English means literally "noisy river".

The headwaters of the Rio Ruidoso are located near the top of 11,981-foot (3,652 m) Sierra Blanca Peak, in the rugged Sierra Blanca mountains, which is located within the Mescalero Apache Indian Reservation. The upper reaches of the river are divided into three forks, the longest of which is the North Fork of the Rio Ruidoso. It begins on the north side of Sierra Blanca at Ice Spring near the Ski Apache ski area. The south and middle forks begin on the south side of the mountain. They merge in Cow Canyon approximately 1-mile (1.6 km) west of the point at which the south fork merges with the north fork. From there, the river winds its way down through the Sacramento Mountains, which are part of the Lincoln National Forest and through the village of Ruidoso, which was named after the river. Just east of Ruidoso two major tributaries, Cedar Creek and Carrizo Creek flow into the Rio Ruidoso.

Along its 30-mile (48 km) course, the river drops 6,000 feet (1,800 m) in elevation. Just west of Hondo, New Mexico the river merges with the Rio Bonito to form the Rio Hondo.

Several fish species live within the waters of the Rio Ruidoso, including:

- Brown trout
- Rainbow trout
- Brook trout
- Rio Grande cutthroat trout

== See also ==
- List of New Mexico rivers
