= Riverside, Lincoln County, New Mexico =

Unincorporated community in New Mexico, United States

Riverside, New Mexico
- Unincorporated community
- Location within New Mexico Location within the United States
- Coordinates: 33°19′58″N 105°03′37″W
- Country: United States
- State: New Mexico
- County: Lincoln
- Elevation: 4,754 ft (1,449 m)
- Time zone: UTC-7 (Mountain (MST))
  - Summer (DST): UTC-6 (MDT)
- ZIP codes: 88343
- GNIS feature ID: 898592

Riverside is an unincorporated community in Lincoln County, New Mexico, in the southwestern United States. It is located along the Rio Hondo that flows east out of the Sacramento Mountains, the Sierra Blanca and the Capitan Mountains of south-central New Mexico. It is on combined routes U.S. 380 and U.S. 70, between the town of Lincoln and Roswell. The nearest community is Sunset about a mile upstream.

== History ==
The settlement was established after World War I when W. O. Norman opened a filling station there, called "Big Hill Filling Station", and a car camp. In 1930 Norman sold his interest and the place was renamed "Riverside Camp", which was soon shortened to "Riverside".
