= Rio Hondo (Southern New Mexico) =

- Etymology: Deep river

Location
- Country: United States
- State: New Mexico
- Counties: Chaves, Lincoln

Physical characteristics
- Source: Sierra Blanca, Capitan Mountains
  - location: Lincoln County
  - coordinates: 33°22′54″N 105°16′17″W
  - elevation: 1,615 m (5,299 ft)
- Mouth: Pecos River
  - location: Chaves County
  - coordinates: 33°22′15″N 104°23′57″W
  - elevation: 1,060 m (3,480 ft)

The Rio Hondo is a 79-mile-long (127 km) river in southern New Mexico which begins at the confluence of the Rio Bonito and Rio Ruidoso rivers near the town of Hondo, New Mexico. The river flows eastward through the Hondo Valley in the foothills of the Sierra Blanca and Capitan Mountains, roughly paralleling the route of U.S. Route 70 through the towns of Picacho and Tinnie. Near the community of Riverside the river passes through a deep canyon before entering the rolling hills west of Roswell.

Approximately 15 miles (24 km) southwest of Roswell the river enters an Army Corps of Engineers flood control reservoir known as the Two Rivers Dam. The reservoir is typically dry except during the spring runoff. The reservoir also contains the runoff of Rocky Arroyo, an intermittent stream that parallels the Rio Hondo a few miles to the south. Two earth fill dams totaling 7,825 feet (2,385 m) in length have the capacity to impound 168,000 acre-feet (207,000,000 m^{3}) of water. The two dams act as two separate reservoirs, one for the Rio Hondo and one for Rocky Arroyo unless the water level is very high. Then the Rio Hondo and Rocky Arroyo reservoirs merge into a single large reservoir.

After passing through the reservoir, the Rio Hondo begins to meander through the flat land of the Pecos River valley. Rocky Arroyo merges with the Rio Hondo 1 mile (1.6 km) west of the Roswell International Air Center then the Hondo travels northeasterly through Roswell. In many areas the natural route of the river has been altered. This is especially true in the city of Roswell where the river has been lined with concrete or paving stones. In Roswell a small tributary, the Spring River, joins the Hondo. Just east of Roswell another tributary, the Berrendo River, also joins, and 3 miles (4.8 km) downstream from there the Rio Hondo empties into the Pecos River near Bottomless Lakes State Park.

The upper stretch of the river typically flows year-round, however irrigation along the length of the river siphons off much of the natural flow. By the time the river reaches Roswell it is dry, except after storms and during the spring runoff from the mountains.

== See also ==
- List of rivers of New Mexico
- List of tributaries of the Rio Grande
