= Acequia =

Community-operated watercourse

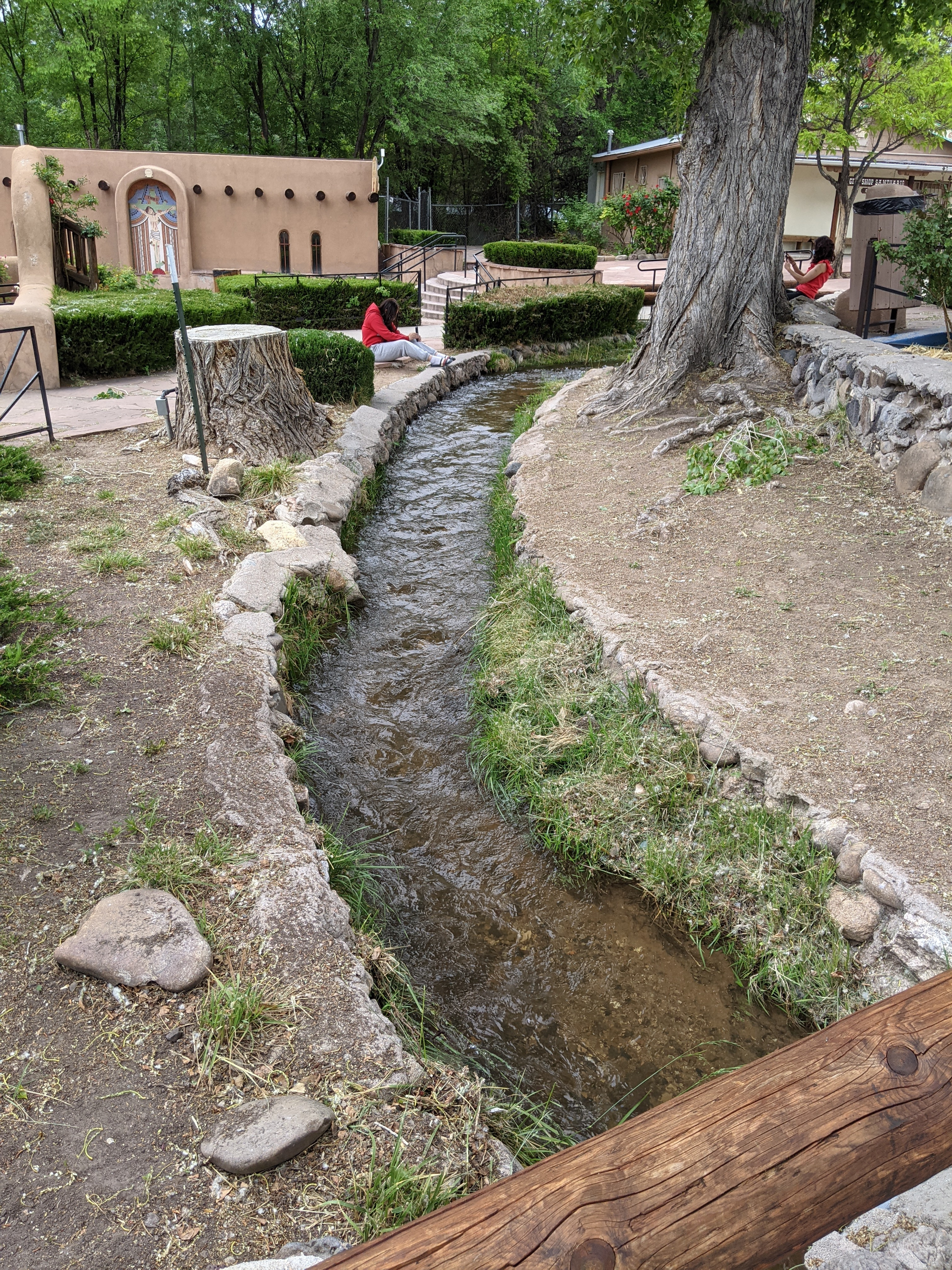
Potrero Ditch, an acequia, passing near the front of El Santuario de Chimayo, New Mexico

An acequia (Spanish: [aˈθekja]) or séquia (Catalan: [ˈsekiə, -a], also known as síquia [ˈsikiə, -a], all from Andalusian Arabic: (ال)ساقية, romanized: (al-)sāqiya) is a community-operated watercourse used for irrigation in Spain and former Spanish colonies in the Americas; they are found in parts of Spain, the Andes, northern Mexico, and what is now the Southwestern United States (primarily New Mexico and Colorado).

In the United States, the oldest known irrigation canals are found throughout the historical region of Nuevo México and date back to 1200 BCE. Irrigation was extensively used by the Pueblo peoples in Oasisamerica in the Pre-Columbian era. In 1598, Hispanos of New Mexico arrived and brought irrigation methods from Europe. This created a very distinctive indigenous and Hispanic tradition of irrigation and agriculture.

Scholars describe acequias as "technological systems that are designed, maintained, and operated to meet a variety of productive goals, social services, and health needs, with the practice of irrigated agriculture being of paramount importance." The traditional form of governance over acequias survives in New Mexico and southern Colorado and is the oldest form of European resource management still alive in the United States today.

Acequias are filled by snow melt and rain to water orchards, gardens, and other agricultural fields. Other than watering crops, acequias have deep cultural significance for many Indigenous and Native communities in New Mexico and Colorado.

== Etymology ==
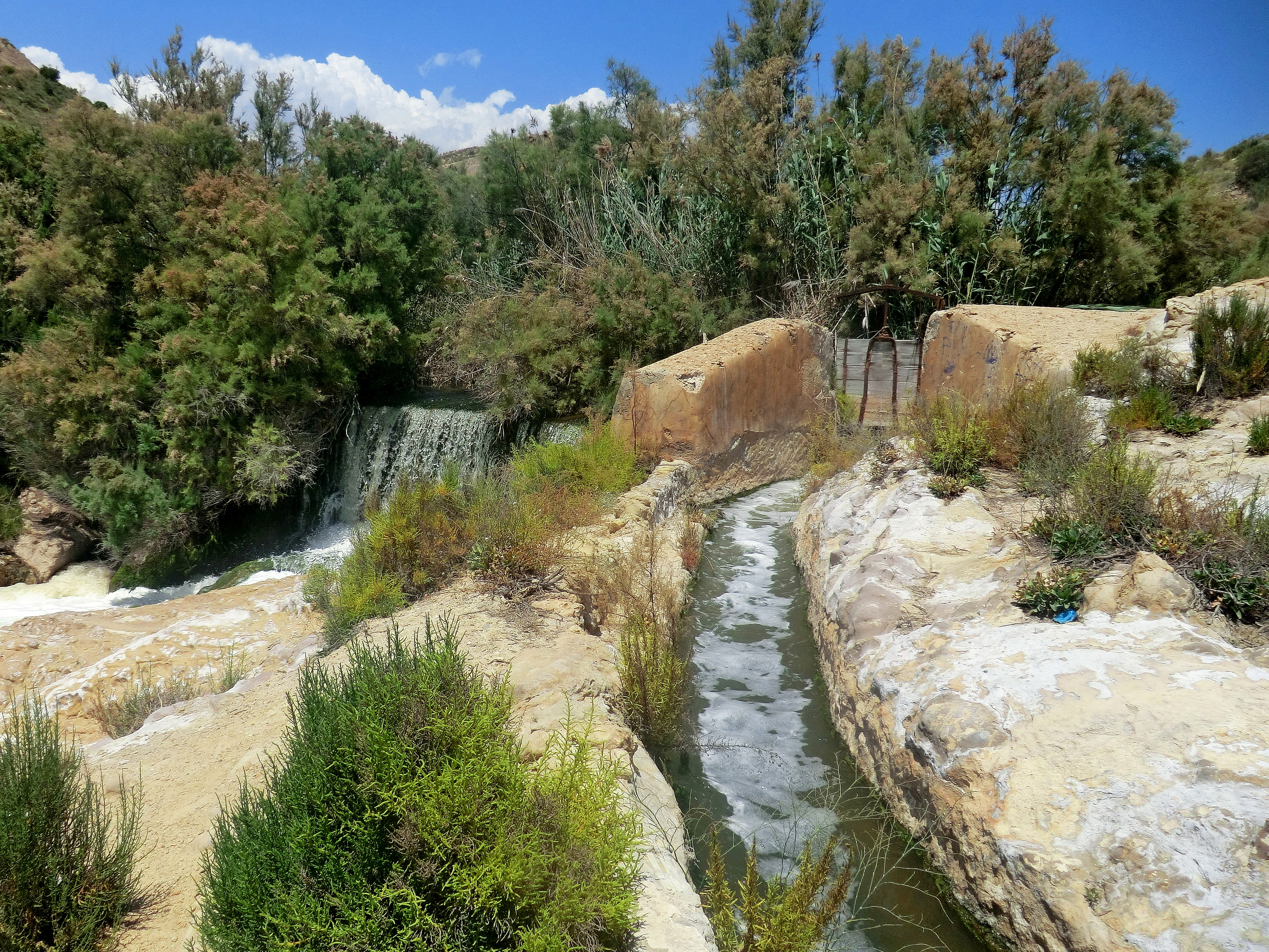
Main acequia, Vallongas, Elche, Valencia, Spain (May 2012)

The Spanish word acequia (and the Catalan word séquia) originate from Arabic word al-sāqiyah (الساقیة) which has more than one meaning: "the water conduit" or "one that bears water" as well as 'bartender' (from سَقَى saqā, "to give water, drink") and also refers to a type of water wheel.

== History ==
Traditionally, the Spanish acequias have been associated with the Muslim colonization of the Iberian Peninsula; however the most likely hypothesis is that they improved on irrigation systems that already existed since Roman times, or even before. These ways of agricultural planning and colonization strategies come from the vast amount of cultural influences contributing to Spanish technology and governance. Likely the most meaningful stemmed from the Muslims that ruled parts of Spain for as long as eight centuries. Their ways of life influenced the Spanish and changed the way agriculture was done in Spain.

Acequias were later adopted by the Spanish and Portuguese (levadass on Madeira Island) and were utilized throughout their own colonies. Similar structures already existed in places such as Mendoza and San Juan, Argentina where acequias today run along both sides of the city streets. However, these acequias were originally dug by the Indigenous Huarpes long before the arrival of the Spanish. The introduction of acequias by the Muslims allowed for more agricultural diversity, with crops such as sugar cane and citrus fruits introduced. The system of the acequia has changed over time to avoid incidents of the resource from being overused or under-maintained.

== Usage in the American Southwest ==
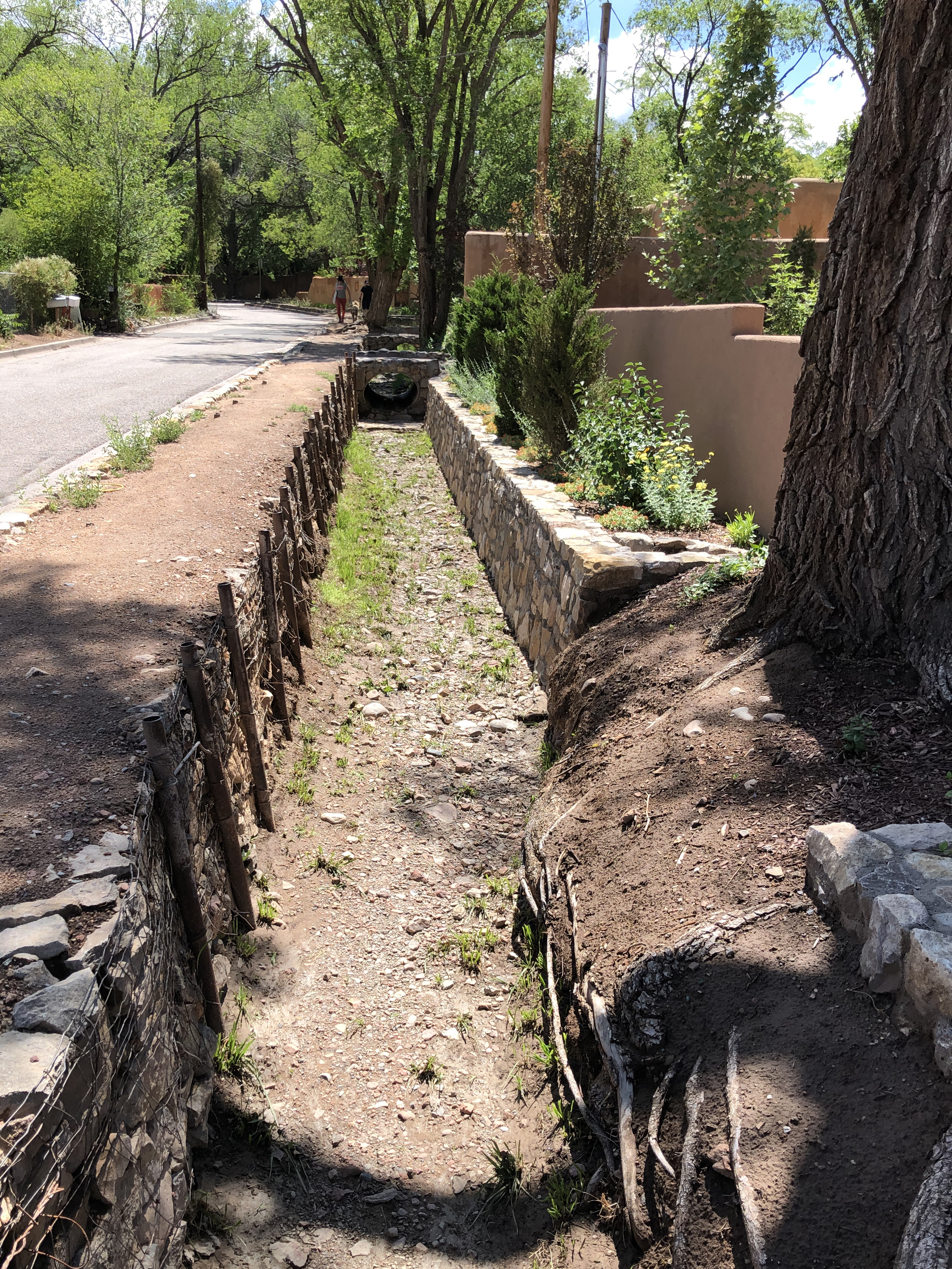
The Acequia Madre (Mother Ditch), Santa Fe, New Mexico, June 2022

The earliest known irrigation canals in the United States date back to 1200 BCE. The Hohokam of Arizona built large irrigation canals beginning about 800 CE. By the year 1400 CE, the Pueblo Indians in New Mexico were using canals and ditches to irrigate their crops. With their arrival in New Mexico in 1598, the Spanish colonizers introduced their system of water management. Subsequently, Spanish acequias were also built and used in California, Arizona, and Texas. Acequias continue to provide a primary source of water for farming and ranching in the region of south central Colorado known as the Upper Rio Grande watershed or Rio Arriba, and some 700 in northern New Mexico continue to function. The governance of these acequias is the oldest style of European resource management still active in the United States today.

== Design ==
Acequias are gravity chutes, similar in concept to flumes. Some acequias are conveyed through pipes or aqueducts, of modern fabrication or decades or centuries old (see transvasement). For the system to function properly the channel must have a good gradient to maintain the flow of water.

When rainfall and snowmelt start to flow it is carried into the Acequia Madre and through the connecting channels throughout parts of New Mexico. Acequias have several components that control the transport of water:

1. compuertas (headgates) — these gates open and close to allow water to flow through the channel
2. canoas (canoes) — log flumes that transport water across intersecting creeks and streams
3. sangrías (vessels) — lateral ditches cut perpendicular from the main canal to irrigate individual parcels of land
4. desagüe (draining channel) — carries surplus water back to the stream source

== Governance in New Mexico ==
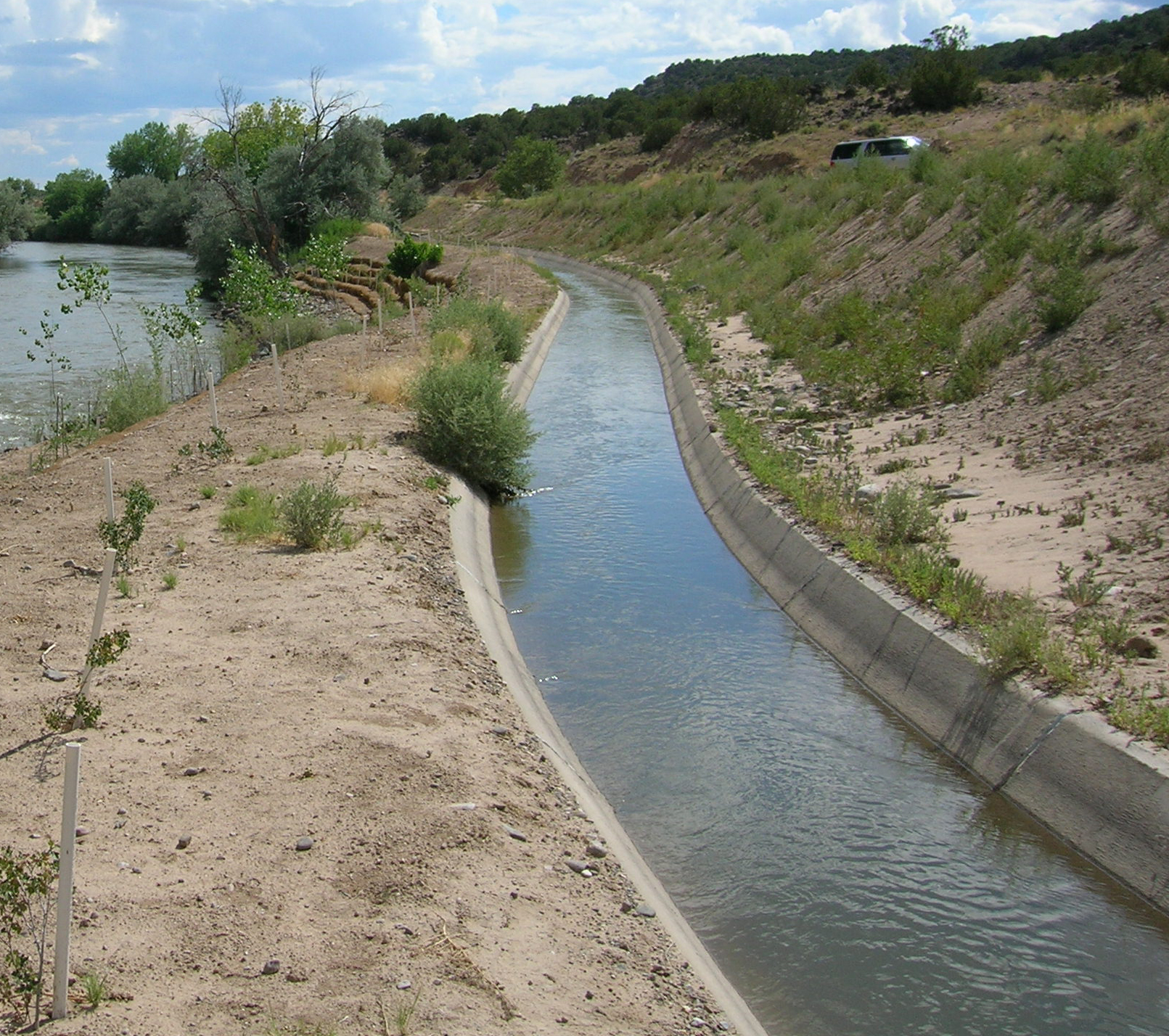
La Canova Acequia, New Mexico

Known among water users simply as "the Acequia", various legal entities embody the community associations, or acequia associations, that govern members' water usage, depending on local precedents and traditions. An acequia organization often must include commissioners and a majordomo who administers usage of water from a ditch, regulating which holders of water rights can release water to their fields on which days. In New Mexico, by state statute, acequias as registered bodies must have three commissioners and a mayordomo. Irrigation and conservation districts typically have their own version of mayordomos, usually referred to as "ditch riders" by members of the districts.

Acequias in New Mexico and Colorado have successfully developed and implemented changes in state water laws to accommodate the unique norms, customs, and practices of the acequia systems. But the communal owners of the acequias in New Mexico experience strong economic pressure from land developers and inflation to sell the valuable acequia. The customary law of the acequia is older than and at variance with the Doctrine of Prior Appropriation, and the statutes promulgating acequia water law represent a rare instance of water pluralism in Western water law in the United States (see Hicks & Peña (2003)). For example, the Doctrine of Prior Appropriation is based on the principle of "first in use, first in right", while acequia norms incorporate not just priority but principles of equity and fairness. This is evident in the fact that Prior Appropriation considers water to be a commodity owned by private individuals while acequia systems treat water as a community resource that irrigators have a shared right to use, manage, and protect. The concept of a shared responsibility natural resources reflects the beliefs stemming from the Spanish and Indigenous people who brought the acequia to the U.S. The plethora of cultural behaviors and values that created acequia communities still exist in the United States.

While Prior Appropriation doctrines allow for water to be sold away from the basin of origin, the acequia system prohibits the transfer of water from the watershed it is situated in and thus considers water as an "asset-in-place". The Prior regime is based on a governance regime in which the members of a mutual ditch company will vote based on their proportional ownership of shares, so that larger farmers have more votes. In contrast, the acequia system follows a "one farmer, one vote" system that has led researchers to consider this a form of "water democracy".

Acequia law also requires that all persons with irrigation rights participate in the annual maintenance of the community ditch including the annual spring time ditch cleanup known as the limpieza y saca de acequia.

== Water disputes and acequias ==
An example of the disputes over allocation of scarce water is the continuing controversy over acequias diverting water from Embudo Creek to the Mora River in New Mexico. Settlers along the Mora River on the eastern side of the Sangre de Cristo Mountains constructed gravity-fed irrigation ditches (acequias) to divert water from three headwaters sources of the Rio Pueblo to the Mora River. (The Rio Pueblo is an upstream tributary of Embudo Creek and not the same as the Rio Pueblo de Taos) The first diversion of water from Alamitos Creek was built about 1820; the second diversion from the Rito de la Presa was built in 1864; and the third and largest diversion was from the Rito Angostura. This diversion via acequias took 20 families three years to construct from 1879 to 1882. The acequia was 8 mi (13 km) long and "constructed without the benefit of sophisticated tools and engineering know-how, accomplishing the seemingly impossible task" of bringing water from one side of the mountains to the other. In drought years as much as one-half of the water of the Rio Pueblo is diverted to the Mora River. In 2021, that water irrigated about 1,900 acres (770 ha) of agricultural land owned by 143 users.

The transfer of water was controversial. The Picuris Pueblo contested the diversion of water from their territory to the Mora River as early as the 1860s and pursued a lawsuit against the diversions of water in the 1880s. The suit was dismissed as no attorney would take the case. Disputes about water continued into the 21st century. In 2021, unidentified persons blocked the acequia directing water from Alamitos Creek with a mound of rocks and interrupted the flow of water to Mora Country. The blockage was quickly removed, but the dispute over water rights continued.

== Gallery ==
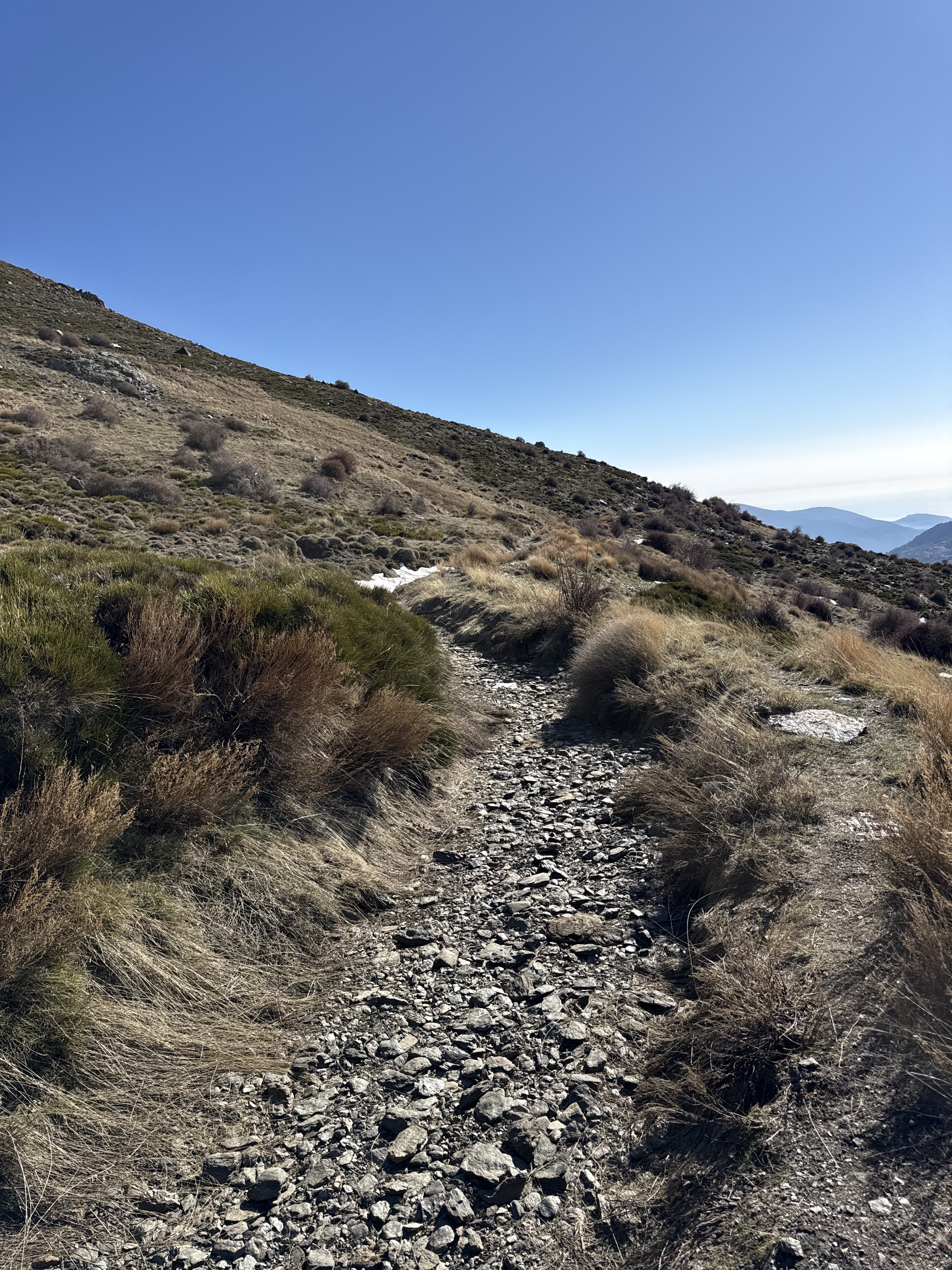
Acequia Alta de Pitres in the Sierra Nevada above Capileira

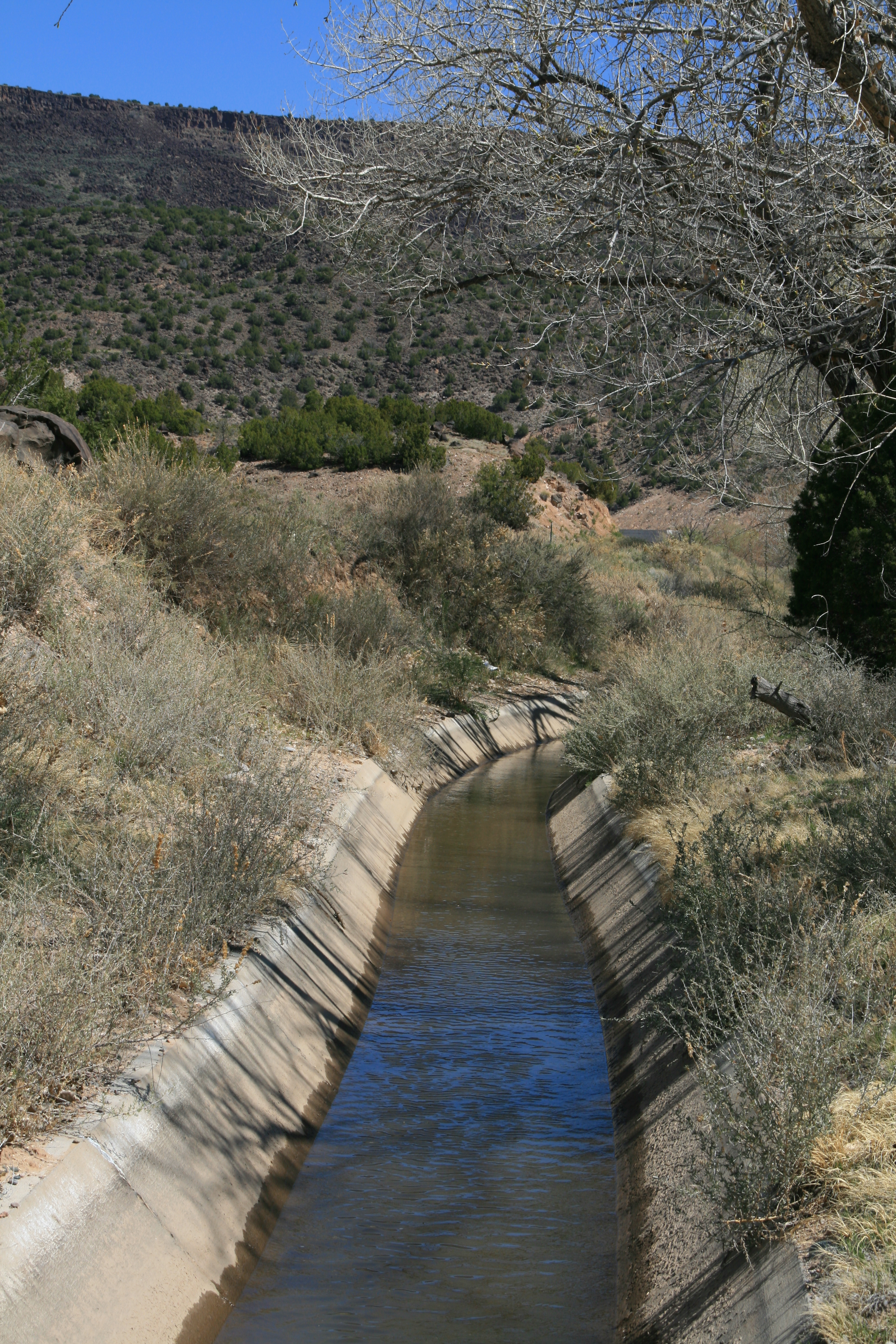
Concrete-lined portion of La Canova acequia, near Velarde, New Mexico

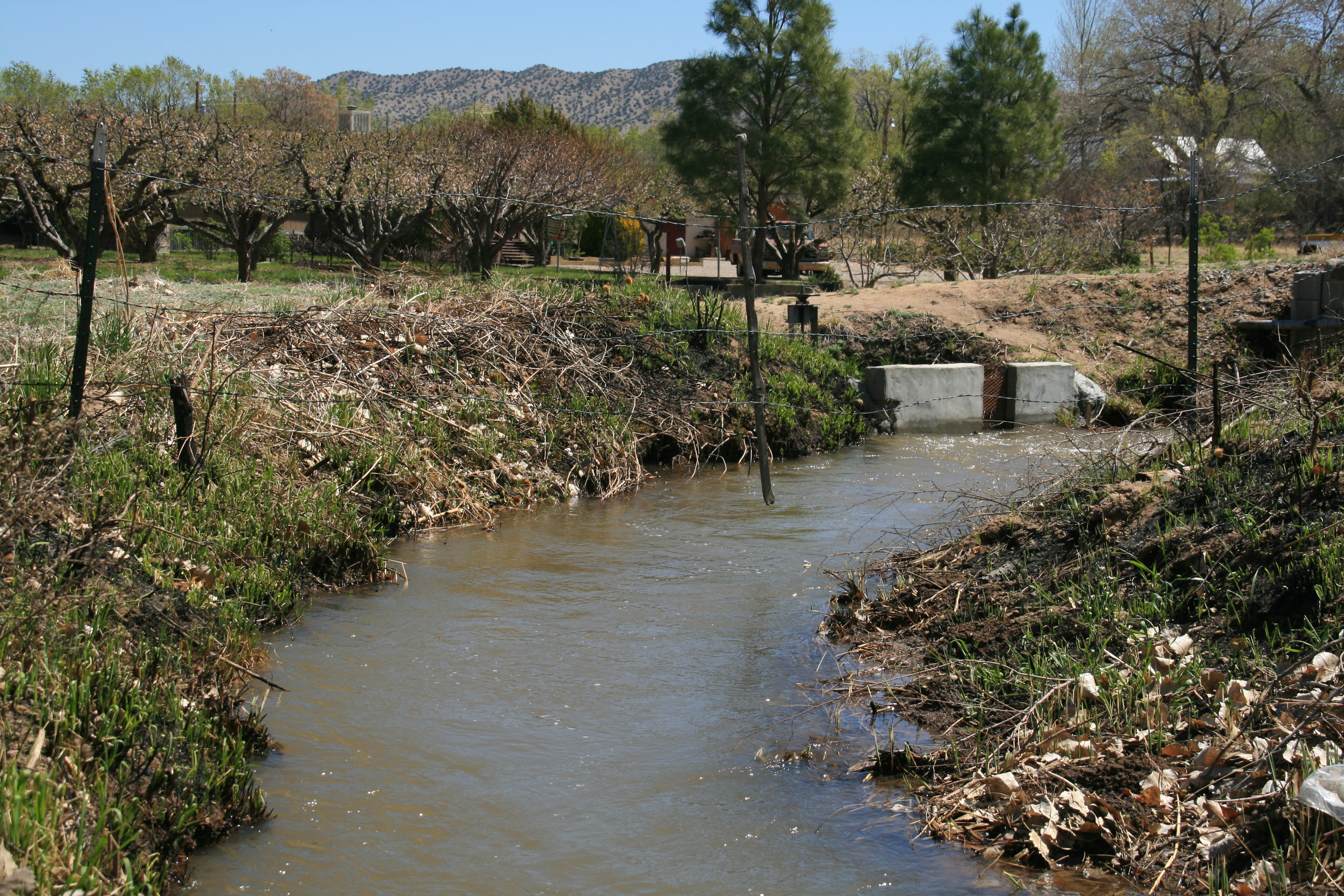
Unlined portion of Los Chicos acequia, near Velarde, New Mexico

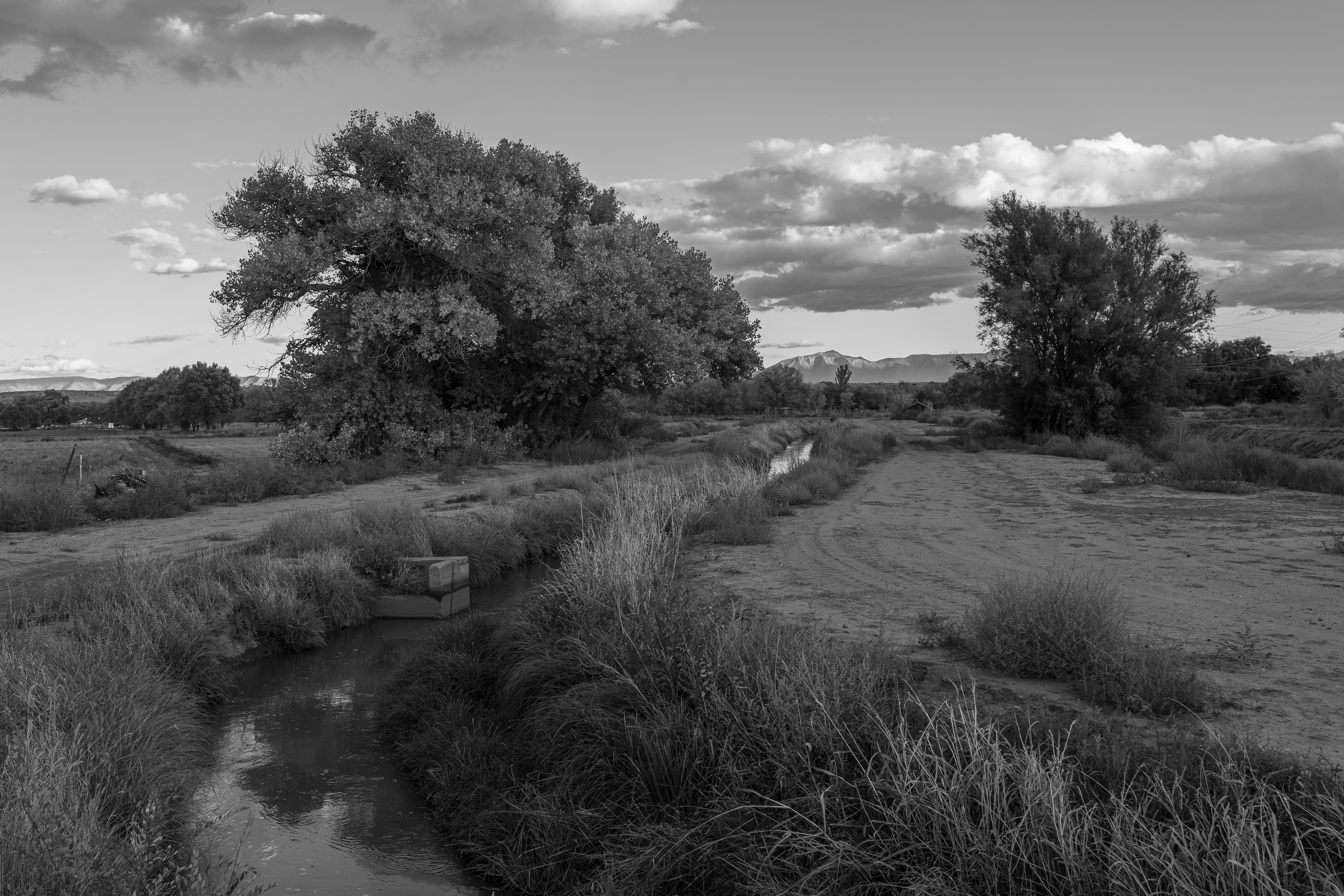
Near the intersection of the Los Padillas Drain and Putnam Drain in South Valley, New Mexico

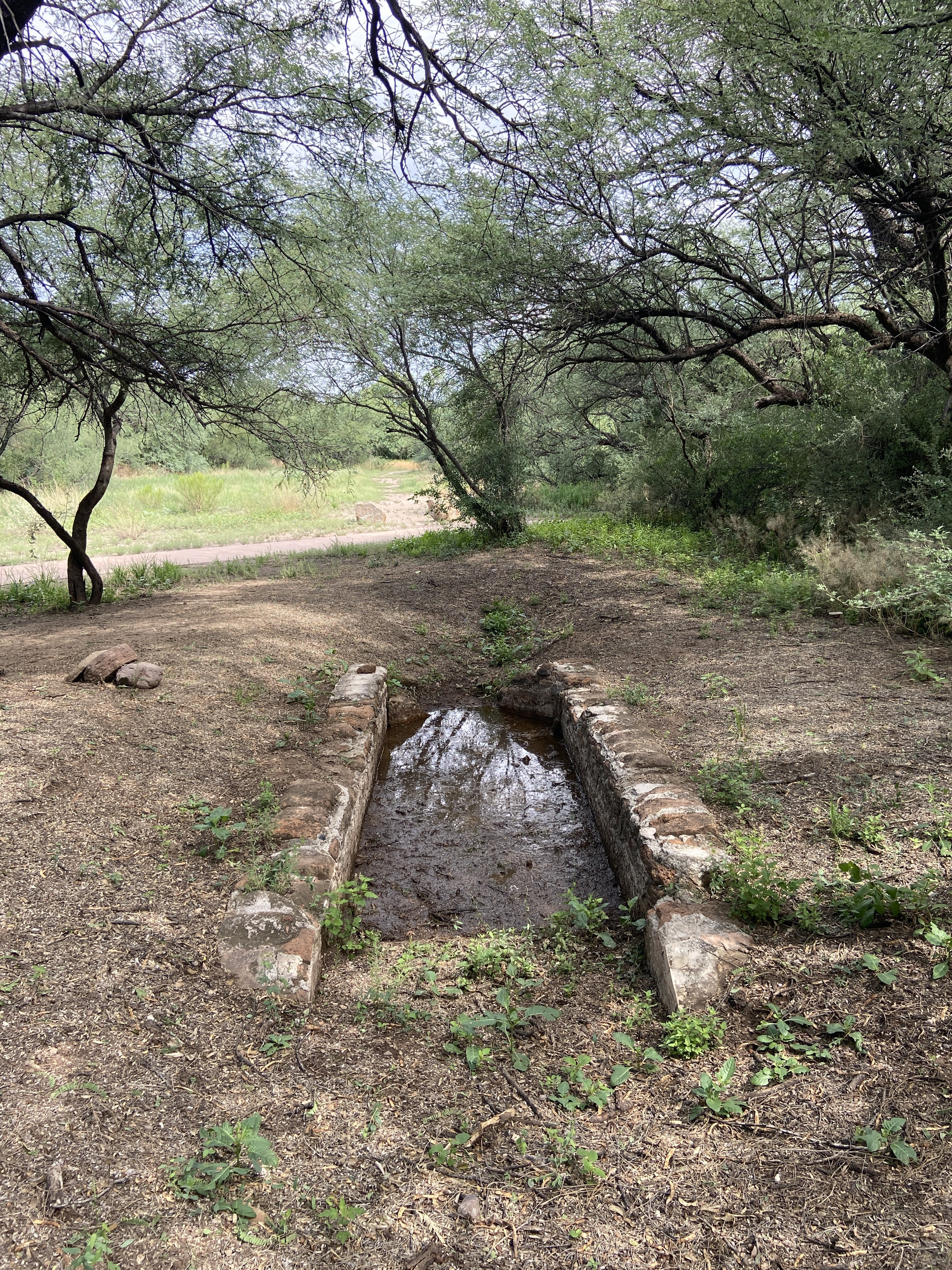
A section of a compuerta (holding area) and historic acequia in Tumacacori National Historical Park, Santa Cruz County, Arizona The trail beyond the compuerta is the original route of the acequia.

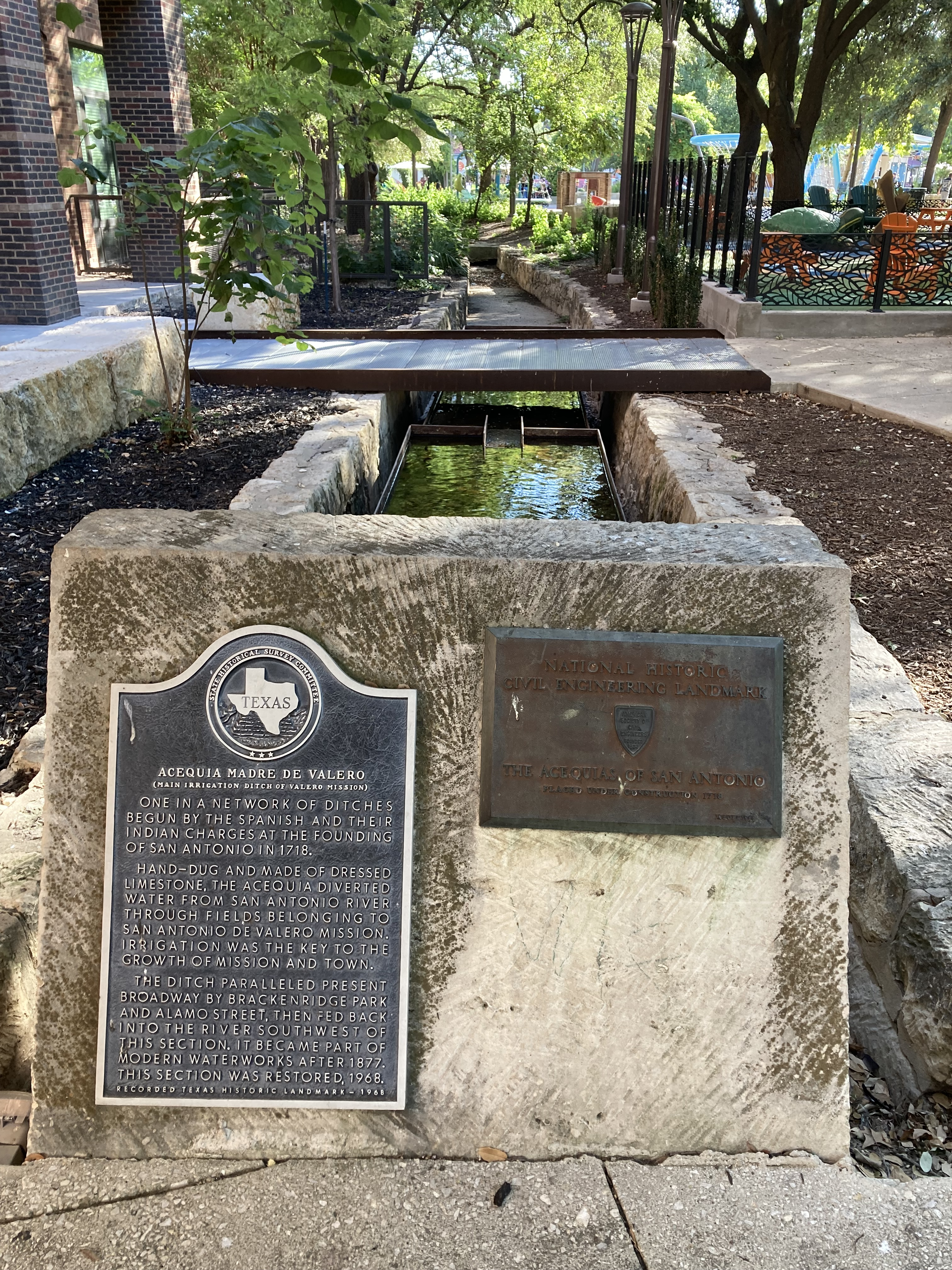
Acequia Madre de Valero historical marker

== See also ==
- Ditch – Small to moderate trench created to channel water
- Huerta – Small consumer-oriented agriculture
- Leat – Artificial watercourse or aqueduct dug into the ground
- Levada – Irrigation canal
- Mueang § Müang Fai irrigation system
- Qanat – Water supply system developed in ancient Iran
- Subak (irrigation) – Balinese irrigation system
- Zanja – Historical irrigation system used in the American Southwest
