= Rio Bonito (New Mexico) =

- Etymology: Beautiful river

Location
- Country: United States
- State: New Mexico
- Counties: Lincoln

Physical characteristics
- Source: Sierra Blanca Mountains
  - location: Lincoln County
  - coordinates: 33°24′57″N 105°49′16″W
  - elevation: 3,002 m (9,849 ft)
- Mouth: Rio Hondo (New Mexico)
  - location: Hondo, New Mexico
  - coordinates: 33°22′54″N 105°16′17″W
  - elevation: 1,615 m (5,299 ft)
- Length: 44 m (144 ft)

Basin features
- River system: Pecos

The Rio Bonito is a small river in the Sierra Blanca mountains of southern New Mexico, United States. The headwaters of the river start in the Lincoln National Forest on the slopes of Sierra Blanca and travel eastward until they merge with the south fork of the Rio Bonito just west of Bonito Lake, a man-made reservoir. After passing through the reservoir, the river continues in a generally eastward direction passing alongside the historic Fort Stanton and the home of Billy the Kid, Lincoln, New Mexico. The Rio Bonito merges 10 miles (16 km) past Lincoln with the Rio Ruidoso in the town of Hondo, New Mexico where the two rivers join to form the Rio Hondo which then flows towards the Pecos River, though not reaching the Pecos except during floods.

Several fish species live within the waters of the Rio Ruidoso, including:

- Several species of trout
- Rio Grande Sucker
- Rio Grande Chub
- Longnose Dace
- Fathead minnow

== See also ==
- Lincoln National Forest
- List of New Mexico rivers
- Mescalero Apache Indian Reservation
- Ruidoso, New Mexico
- Sacramento Mountains
- Sierra Blanca
