= Two Rivers Dam =

- Location within New Mexico
- Country: United States
- Location: Chaves County, New Mexico
- Coordinates: 33°17′52″N 104°43′23″W
- Purpose: Flood control
- Opening date: August 1963
- Owner: United States Army Corps of Engineers

Dam and spillways
- Type of dam: Embankment, earth-fill
- Impounds: Hondo River & Rocky Arroyo
- Height: 107 ft (33 m)
- Length: 7,950 ft (2,420 m)
- Width (base): 600 ft (180 m)

Reservoir
- Normal elevation: 3,950 ft (1,200 m) AMSL

The Two Rivers Dam is a dry dam in southeastern New Mexico, sixteen miles west-southwest of the city of Roswell. It consists of two dams separated by a strip of higher land approximately 1.5 miles wide. Typically, no water is stored behind the dams; they serve primarily for flood control. However, during spring runoff, water backs up behind the northern dam. This creates a small oasis in the lowlands behind the dam.

Both dams are earth-fill structures with coarse rubble on their faces to prevent erosion. The crests of both dams are 4,058 feet above sea level. During a flood, the reservoirs remain separate until the water level reaches 4,000 feet above sea level, at which point they merge into a single large reservoir.

== Northern Dam ==
The northern dam, also known as the Diamond A dam or the first dam, is 5000 feet long and 95 feet tall. It is 525 feet wide at the base and 24 feet wide at the top. It crosses the Hondo River. At the base of the dam there is a flood control gate which can be closed to prevent flood waters from flowing downstream. The gate is normally left open to allow the river to flow freely. The gate is only closed when it is necessary to prevent flooding. This dam has a two lane gravel road across the top which is open to the public. The southern dam is accessed by crossing the northern dam.

== Southern Dam ==
The southern dam, also known as the second dam, is 2950 feet long and 107 feet tall. It is 600 feet wide at the base and 18 feet wide at the top. It crosses the Rocky Arroyo, which is an intermittent stream. Rocky Arroyo doesn't normally have water flowing through it and the impoundment area behind the dam is much drier than the impoundment area behind the northern dam.

== History ==
The city of Roswell suffered devastating floods in 1937, 1941, and 1954. After the 1954 flood, the US Congress passed the Watershed Protection and Flood Prevention Act of 1954 which authorized the Corps of Engineers to build dams to protect Roswell from floods. The dams were completed in 1963.
