= List of rivers of New Mexico =

This is a list of rivers in the U.S. state of New Mexico arranged by drainage basin, with respective tributaries indented under each larger stream's name. In mean flow of water per second, the San Juan River Arkansas is New Mexico's largest river, followed by the Rio Grande and the Animas River.

== East of the continental divide ==
=== Mississippi watershed ===
- Mississippi River
  - Arkansas River
    - Canadian River
      - North Canadian River
        - Beaver River
          - Corrumpa Creek
          - Seneca Creek
      - Punta de Agua Creek (TX)
        - Rita Blanca Creek (TX)
          - Carrizo Creek (New Mexico/Texas)
        - Tramperos Creek
      - Ute Creek
      - La Cinta Creek
      - Conchas River
      - Mora River
        - Coyote Creek
        - Sapello River
      - Cimarron River
      - Vermejo River
    - Dry Cimarron River
    - Purgatoire River

=== Rio Grande watershed ===
- Rio Grande
  - Costilla Creek
  - Rio San Antonio
    - Rio de los Pinos
  - Pecos River
    - Delaware River
    - Black River
    - Rio Penasco
    - Rio Felix
    - Rio Hondo (Southern New Mexico)
      - Berrendo River
      - Rio Bonito
      - Rio Ruidoso
    - Arroyo del Macho
      - Gallo Arroyo
    - Taiban Creek
    - Pintada Arroyo
    - Gallinas River
  - Alamosa Creek
  - Rio Salado
  - Rio Puerco
    - Rio San Jose
    - Arroyo Chico
  - Jemez River
  - Galisteo Creek
  - Santa Fe River
  - Pojoaque River
    - Rio Chupadero
  - Rio Chama
    - Rio Ojo Caliente
      - Rio Vallecitos
      - Rio Tusas
    - Rio del Oso
    - El Rito
    - Rio Puerco
    - Rio Gallina
      - Rio Capulin
    - Rio Cebolla
    - Rio Nutrias
    - Rio Brazos
    - Rio Chamita
  - Embudo Creek
  - Rio Pueblo de Taos
  - Rio Hondo (Northern New Mexico)
  - Red River

=== Interior basin ===
- Mimbres River

== West of the continental divide ==
=== Colorado watershed ===
- Colorado River
  - Gila River
    - San Francisco River
      - Tularosa River
  - Little Colorado River
    - Puerco River
      - Black Creek (Arizona)
    - Zuni River
      - Rio Nutria
      - Rio Pescado
  - San Juan River
    - Chaco River
    - La Plata River
    - Animas River
    - Los Pinos River
    - Navajo River

== Rivers listed by average flow rate ==
The table lists mean flow in cubic feet of water per second (cfs) of each river with a flow rate of more that 30 cfs. One cubic foot of water equals .0283 cubic meters. The waters of most rivers in New Mexico are used extensively for irrigation, thus reducing mean flow rates.

River	cubic feet per second (cfs) flow	Location of monitoring station	Maximum flow cfs (date)	Minimum flow cfs (date)
San Juan River	1,983	Shiprock	80,000 (August 22, 1929)	8.0 (August 25,26, 1939
Rio Grande	1,391	San Felipe Pueblo	27,300 (June 26,1937)	32.0 (July 7, 1934)
Animas River	853	Farmington	25,000 (June 29, 1927)	0.00 (August 8, 1996)
Rio Chama	559	near Chamita	15,000 (May 22, 1920)	1.2 (September 16, 1971)
Gila River	237	near Red Rock	48,400 (December 19, 1978)	2.2 (August 5, 1947)
Pecos River	217	near Artesia	51,500 (May 30, 1937)	0.00 (October 1, 1934)
Canadian River	164	Near Sanchez	145,000 (June 18, 1965)	0.00 (March 31, 1936)
Los Pinos River	116	near Ortiz, Colorado	3,160 (May 12, 1941)	1.7 (August 27, 2002)
San Francisco River	86.5	near Glenwood	37,100 (October 2, 1983)	1.5 (December 3, 1906)
Embudo Creek	80.3	near Dixon	4,200 (August 29, 1977)	0.06 (June 26, 1950)
Jemez River	72.4	near Jemez Pueblo	5,900 (April 21, 1958)	1.2 (July 25, 1981)
Ojo Caliente River	66.9	La Madera	3,730 (July 19, 2013)	0.20 (August 17, 1956)
Rio Pueblo de Taos	58.8	near Los Cordovas	2,380 (August 24, 1957)	0.00 (July 30, 2003)
Costilla Creek	44.9	near Costilla	1,150 (May 11, 1942)	0.34 (March 15, 1969)
Rio Pueblo	42.4	near Penasco	2,200 (May 19, 1994)	0.91 (August 13, 2002)
Red River	41.3	near Questa	886 (May 25, 1942)	0.60 (January 21, 1981)
Revuelto Creek	39.5	near Logan	26,700 (July 9, 1960)	0.00 (October 20, 1959)
Rio Puerco	38.8	near Bernardo	18,800 (September 23, 1941)	0.00 (September 23, 1941)
Rio Hondo	34.2	near Valdez	541 (May 13, 1941)	1.0 (January 27, 1942)
Mora River	32.7	near Terrero	937 (May 22, 1991)	0.90 (January 12, 1964)
Santa Cruz River	30.7	near Cundiyo	2,420 (September 24, 1931)	0.19 (March 13, 1954)
Mogollon Creek	30.2	near Cliff	10,800 (August 12, 1967)	0.00 (October 13, 1995)

Source: "Water Resources Data for the United States," United States Geological Survey, , Search: New Mexico.

== See also ==
- List of mountain ranges of New Mexico
- List of valleys of New Mexico
- List of rivers in the United States
