= Hondo, New Mexico =

- Unincorporated community
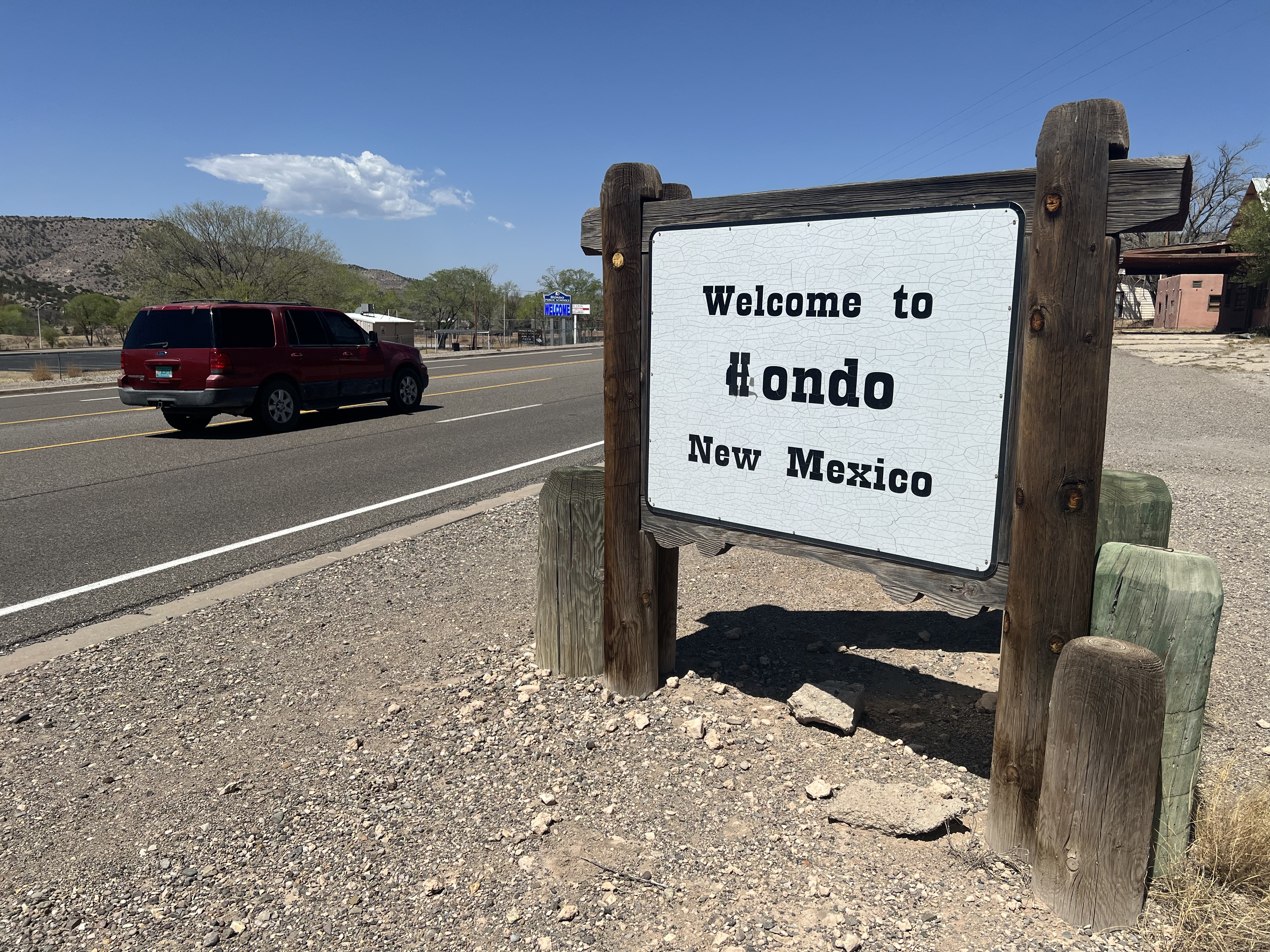

- Location within New Mexico Location within the United States
- Coordinates: 33°23′30″N 105°16′29″W
- Country: United States
- State: New Mexico
- County: Lincoln
- Elevation: 5,230 ft (1,590 m)

Population (July 2007)
  - Total: 1,081
- Time zone: UTC-7 (Mountain (MST))
  - Summer (DST): UTC-6 (MDT)
- ZIP codes: 88336
- Area code: 575
- GNIS feature ID: 923610

Hondo is an unincorporated community in Lincoln County, New Mexico, United States. It is located about thirty-five miles downstream (east) from Ruidoso Downs, where the Rio Bonito and Rio Ruidoso rivers join to form the Rio Hondo. It is located at the point where U.S. Route 70 is joined by U.S. Route 380, which conjoined route continues eastward. It has had a post office since 1900.

== History ==
The community was founded by Hispanic settlers from the Rio Grande valley in the 1880s after the U.S. Army had controlled the Apache in the area. It was originally called La Junta (the junction) because of the joining of the Rio Bonito and the Rio Ruidoso. Later it was called Hondo (deep) after the river.

Prior to settlement, the Apache lived in the area, and skirmishes continued to occur after the establishment of Fort Stanton. According to an interview of Frank Coe, settlers arriving before 1861 lived in placitas, or "adobe family compounds enclosed for defensive purposes", which are still visible in the linear layout Hondo continues to maintain today. The earliest settlers ranched and farmed, sometimes trading with Fort Stanton.

By the 1930s, U.S. Route 70 was built, passing fairly north of Hondo. By then, the community consisted of a school, community buildings, and several households.

== Events ==
In May 1948, Fermín S. Montes and his wife, Cirenia, started a fiesta highlighting the springtime flowers and traditional Mexican dances, now known as the Hondo Fiesta or Fiesta de Hondo. Since then, every year the community of Hondo has come together to celebrate the town's history and culture through food, children's performances, and traditional music and dancing. The Hondo Fiesta is open to the public and is a celebration of the town's heritage and culture.

== Notable people ==
- Luis Jiménez - sculptor and graphic artist
