= Ski Apache =

Ski resort in New Mexico, United States

Coordinates: 33°23′50″N 105°47′57″W

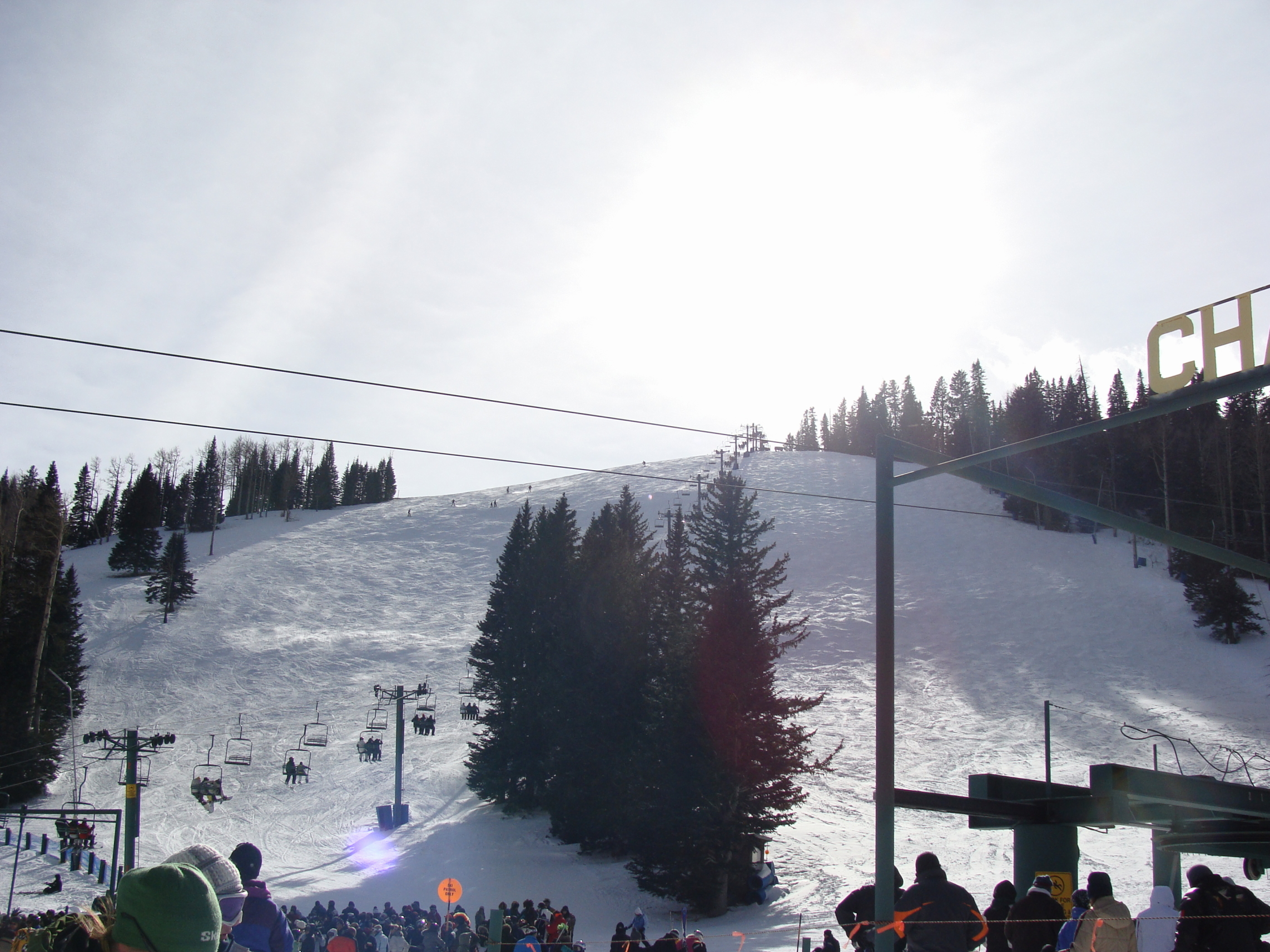

- Location in New Mexico Ski Apache (the United States)
- Location: Lincoln County, New Mexico, USA
- Nearest city: Ruidoso, New Mexico
- Vertical: 1,900 ft (579 m)
- Top elevation: 11,500 ft (3,500 m)
- Base elevation: 9,600 ft (2,900 m)
- Skiable area: 750 acres (300 ha)
- Trails: 55 total 20% beginner 60% intermediate 20% advanced
- Longest run: "Sierra Blanca Trail" ~ 2.5 miles
- Lift system: 8 total (1 gondola, 3 quad chairs, 4 triple chairs
- Terrain parks: 2
- Website: skiapache.com

Ski Apache is a ski resort located in southern New Mexico on the slopes of Sierra Blanca mountains. It is owned and operated, since 1963, by the Mescalero Apache Tribe. Ski Apache was the only ski resort in New Mexico with its own gondola lift, until Taos Ski Valley obtained a gondola lift but it doesn't serve ski runs, but connects the children's center to the base making the Gondola at Apache the only true Gondola lift in the entire state. Runs in the resort include Apache Bowl, an intermediate run on the upper west side of the mountain known for its wide, open space, and views from the top of Chairlift 6; Capitan, a steep, challenging pitch that drops 475 feet; and the Gondola Liftline, a steep and narrow advanced run that runs from the top of the mountain to the main lodge. Another run is Snow Park, which is known for being one of the most difficult beginner runs in the world, steeper than some "blue" runs at the resort. Ski Apache has eight lifts including one gondola lift, three quad chairlifts, and four triple chairlifts. The resort receives an average annual snowfall of fifteen feet.

Ski Apache also has three zip lines. The longest is one mile long and starts at 11,500 feet elevation.

== Image Gallery ==
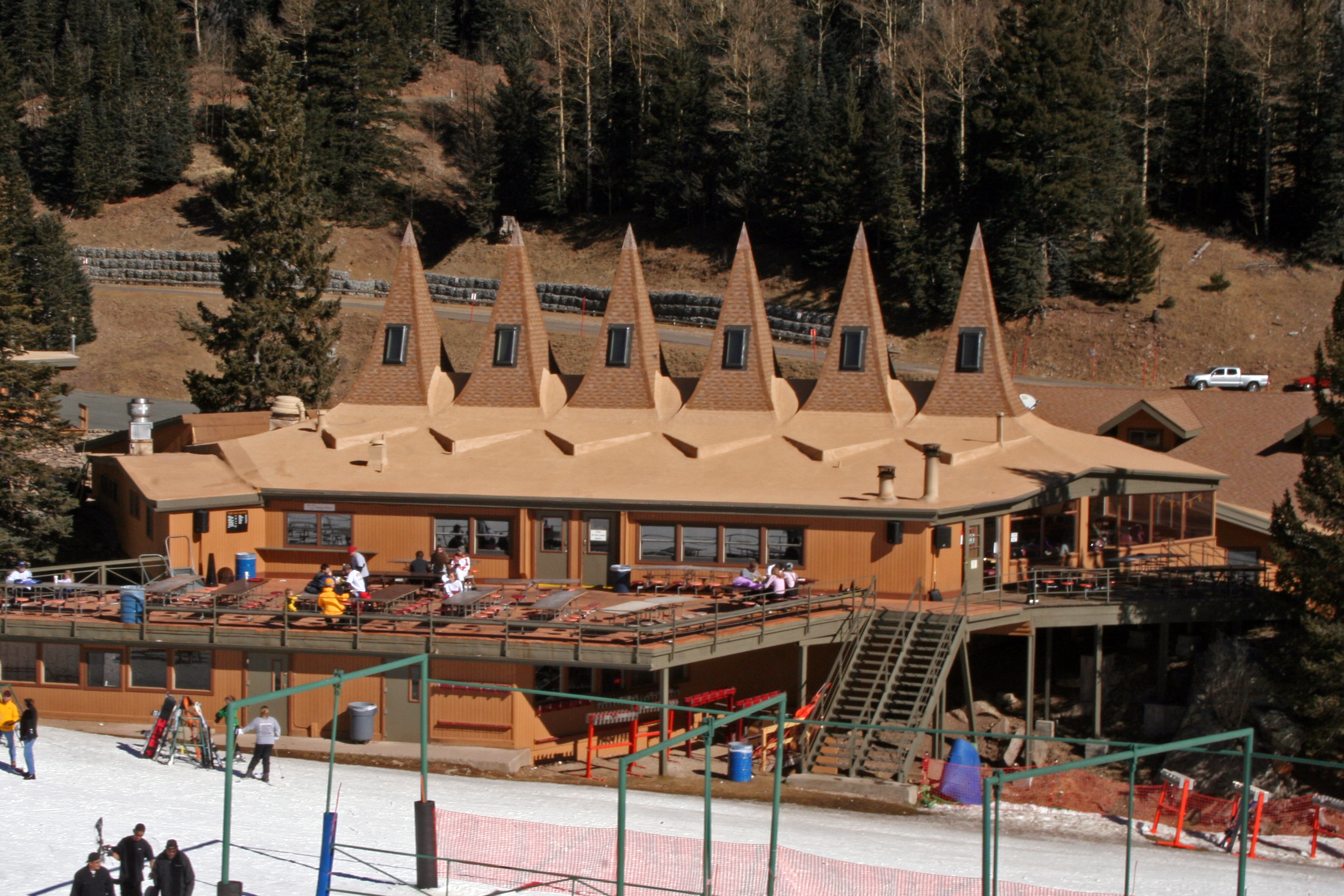
The Lodge at Ski Apache in 2006
