= Rio Hondo (Northern New Mexico) =

River in Taos County, New Mexico, United States

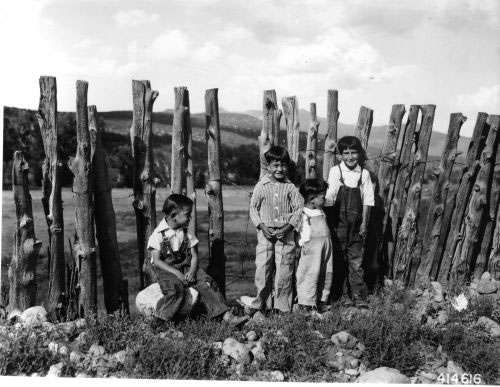
- Children near the Rio Hondo, Taos County, 1941

- Location of the mouth of the Rio Hondo in New Mexico
- Etymology: Spanish for "deep river."

Location
- Country: United States
- State: New Mexico
- County: Taos

Physical characteristics
- Source: Above Taos Ski Valley
  - location: Taos Mountains
  - coordinates: 36°36′40″N 105°25′42″W
  - elevation: 10,840 ft (3,300 m)
- Mouth: Rio Grande
  - location: Rio Grande Gorge
  - coordinates: 36°32′11″N 105°39′37″W
  - elevation: 6,840 ft (2,080 m)
- Length: 20 mi (32 km)

The Rio Hondo is a river in northern New Mexico. A left tributary of the Rio Grande, it flows approximately 20 miles (32 km) from its headwaters high in the Sangre de Cristo Mountains near Wheeler Peak and the Taos Ski Valley to its discharge in the Rio Grande Gorge just west of the community of Arroyo Hondo. Portions of the Rio Hondo are prized as prime spots for bird-watching and fishing. The river was the subject of a 2005 study by the New Mexico Environment Department Surface Water Quality Bureau into the effects of wastewater from Taos Ski Valley, which is discharged from the Village of Taos Ski Valley Waste Water Treatment Plant.

In Spanish, Río Hondo means "deep river".

== See also ==
- List of tributaries of the Rio Grande
- List of rivers of New Mexico
