= Sierra Blanca (New Mexico) =

Mountain range in New Mexico, USA

Sierra Blanca Peak
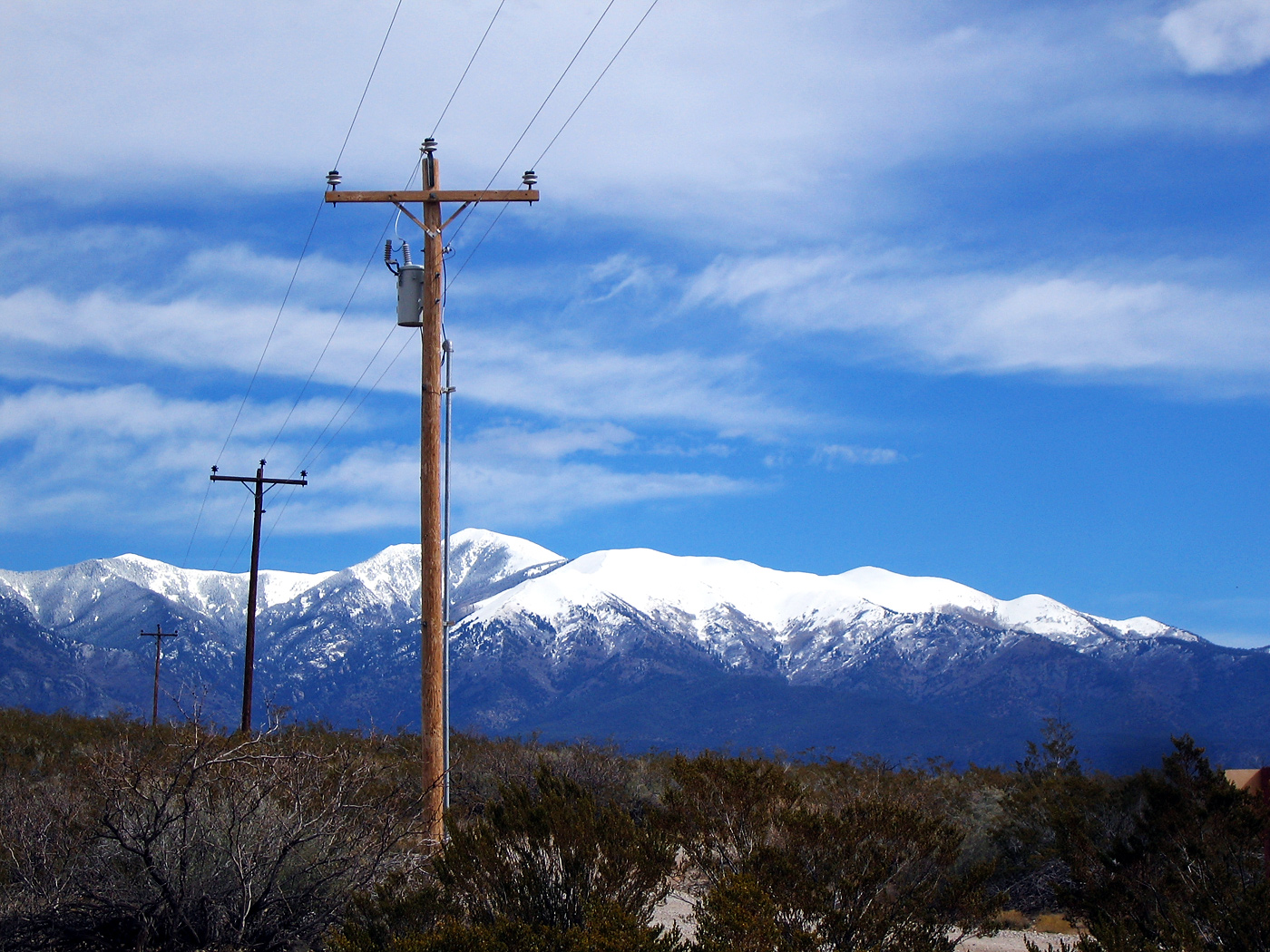

Highest point
- Elevation: 11,981 ft (3,652 m) NAVD 88
- Prominence: 5,533 ft (1,686 m)
- Listing: North America isolated peaks 74th; U.S. most prominent peaks 88th
- Coordinates: 33°22′28″N 105°48′31″W

Geography
- Location within New Mexico
- Location: Lincoln / Otero counties, New Mexico, U.S.
- Topo map: USGS Sierra Blanca Peak

Geology
- Rock age: 26 to 38 million years
- Mountain type: Stratovolcano complex

Climbing
- Easiest route: Hike south from ski area

Sierra Blanca Peak

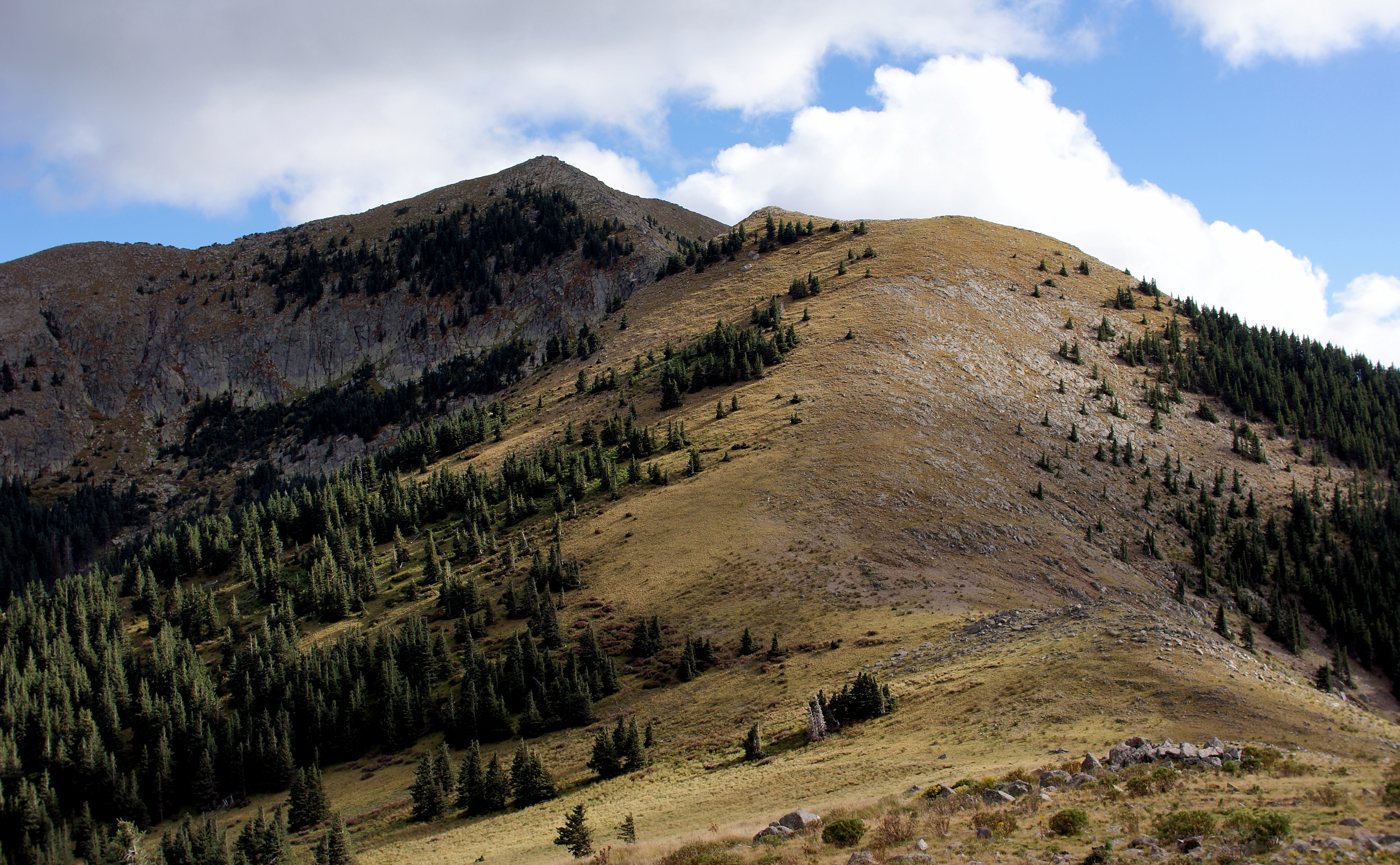
The primary route to the summit follows the ridge at right

The Sierra Blanca (Spanish: White Mountains) is an ultra-prominent range of volcanic mountains in Lincoln and Otero counties in the south-central part of the U.S. state of New Mexico. The range is about 40 miles (60 km) from north to south and 20 miles (30 km) wide.

Sierra Blanca Peak (White Peak) is the highest mountain in the range at 11,981 feet (3,652 m). It is southern New Mexico's highest peak, as well as the most prominent (5,533 feet) and the 40th highest in the entire state. It is also the most southerly peak and land area to exceed 11,000 feet in the continental United States (Only 19 feet shy of being the most southerly area above 12,000 feet). The peak is located on the Mescalero Apache Indian Reservation, approximately 10 miles (16 km) west-northwest of Ruidoso and 30 miles (50 km) north-northeast of Alamogordo.

== Geography ==
The majority of the Sierra Blanca range is within the Lincoln National Forest, and part of this is protected as the White Mountain Wilderness Area. Much of the southern half of the range, including the summit of Sierra Blanca Peak, is within the Mescalero Apache Indian Reservation. The peak is sacred to the Mescalero Apache, and requires a permit from the tribe for access. To the south, across the valley of the Rio Tularosa, lie the Sacramento Mountains. To the north is Carrizozo Mountain, and to the northeast lie the Capitan Mountains. On the west side, the range rises high above the Tularosa Basin.

The range serves as the headwaters for the Rio Ruidoso, Rio Tularosa, and Rio Bonito, as well as numerous arroyos draining into the Tularosa Basin, including Nogal Arroyo at the north end of the range.

Sierra Blanca Peak dominates the range and can be seen for many miles, particularly within the Tularosa Basin. It is visible from as far away as Sandia Crest near Albuquerque. It is one of the southernmost points at which alpine ecosystems occur in the United States. Rising more than 5,500 feet (1,700 m) above the adjacent Tularosa Basin, it has the highest topographic prominence in the state.

The eastern foothills of the Sierra Blanca range include the town of Ruidoso. The area has a number of popular hiking and camping destinations. Sierra Blanca Peak is the towering backdrop and snow-maker for Ski Apache, the southernmost major ski resort in North America. Ski Apache is located mostly on land within the Lincoln National Forest and is operated as a concession under contract to the U.S. Forest Service by the Mescalero Apache Tribe's Inn of the Mountain Gods.

=== Climate ===
Climate data for Sierra Blanca 33.3750 N, 105.8118 W, Elevation: 11,467 ft (3,495 m) (1991–2020 normals)
Month	Jan	Feb	Mar	Apr	May	Jun	Jul	Aug	Sep	Oct	Nov	Dec	Year
Mean daily maximum °F (°C)	35.2 (1.8)	36.2 (2.3)	42.0 (5.6)	47.1 (8.4)	55.3 (12.9)	64.6 (18.1)	63.9 (17.7)	61.7 (16.5)	57.9 (14.4)	51.5 (10.8)	44.6 (7.0)	35.9 (2.2)	49.7 (9.8)
Daily mean °F (°C)	25.0 (−3.9)	25.5 (−3.6)	30.5 (−0.8)	35.0 (1.7)	43.2 (6.2)	51.8 (11.0)	52.3 (11.3)	50.9 (10.5)	46.9 (8.3)	40.0 (4.4)	33.6 (0.9)	25.7 (−3.5)	38.4 (3.5)
Mean daily minimum °F (°C)	14.8 (−9.6)	14.9 (−9.5)	18.9 (−7.3)	23.0 (−5.0)	31.1 (−0.5)	39.0 (3.9)	40.7 (4.8)	40.2 (4.6)	35.9 (2.2)	28.6 (−1.9)	22.5 (−5.3)	15.4 (−9.2)	27.1 (−2.7)
Average precipitation inches (mm)	3.08 (78)	2.58 (66)	2.42 (61)	1.64 (42)	1.81 (46)	2.62 (67)	6.28 (160)	5.61 (142)	4.03 (102)	2.77 (70)	2.28 (58)	3.82 (97)	38.94 (989)
Source: PRISM Climate Group

== Volcanology ==
Sierra Blanca is a massive complex of volcanic rocks, including pyroclastic materials, lava flows, and intrusions. An ancient and heavily eroded volcanic pile, it is the largest mid-Tertiary volcanic complex east of the Rio Grande, with an estimated volume of erupted products of 185 cubic miles (770 km^{3}). Eruptions began about 38 million years ago, and extended over a twelve-million-year period. Most of the eruptions produced voluminous lava flows and breccias, with numerous intrusive dikes emplaced throughout the complex. The final activity produced the intrusions which form the present-day Sierra Blanca Peak. Following the volcanic period, the range's topography was modified by Pleistocene glaciation, block faulting, and erosion.

Between 2007 and 2014, the Sierra Blanca complex was geologically mapped, and the following stratigraphy was adopted:

- Godfrey Hills Group
  - Husk Windmill Formation (28.7–28.2 Ma): trachytic lava flows and tuff
    - Crawford Canyon Trachyte (28.6 Ma)
    - Rose Peak Trachyte (28.6 Ma)
    - 'Palisades Tuff (28.7 Ma): trachytic tuff
  - Lopez Spring Formation (34–28.7 Ma): lava flows of diverse composition
- Nogal Peak Trachyte (31.4 Ma)
- Church Mountain Phonolite (32.7 Ma)
- Walker Group
  - Three Rivers Formation, divided into members:
    - Buck Pasture Tuff
    - Double Diamond Member (36–34 Ma), laterally discontinuous volcaniclastics, basaltic trachyandesite, phonotephrite, and trachyte
    - Argentina Spring Tuff (36 Ma)
    - Taylor Windmill Member: Maroon volcaniclastic sediments interbedded with flows of trachybasalt to trachyte
    - Rattlesnake Member: plagioclase-bearing basaltic trachyandesite flows
  - Hog Pen Formation: interbedded debris flows and basalt to basaltic trachyandesite flows

These rest on the Sanders Canyon Formation, an Eocene sedimentary rock unit. They are intruded by the Three Rivers, Rialto, and Bonito Lake stocks. The Three Rivers Stock, which underlies Sierra Blanca Peak itself, is the largest of these and consists of multiple intrusions, and is composed mostly of syenite to alkali feldspar granite. It was emplaced 29 to 28 million years ago and is interpreted as the shallow magma chamber below a deeply eroded caldera.

The volcanic complex is part of the High Plains alkaline province, which lies along the boundary between the tectonically stable High Plains and the tectonically active western United States. It formed in the Sierra Blanca Basin, a northeast extension of the Tularosa Basin, during the time when the Rio Grande rift first began to open.

== See also ==
- List of Ultras of the United States
- List of mountain peaks of North America
  - List of mountain peaks of the United States
    - List of mountain peaks of New Mexico
