= Rio Pueblo de Taos =

Stream in Taos County, New Mexico, United States

Rio Pueblo de Taos Rio Pueblo, Taos Creek
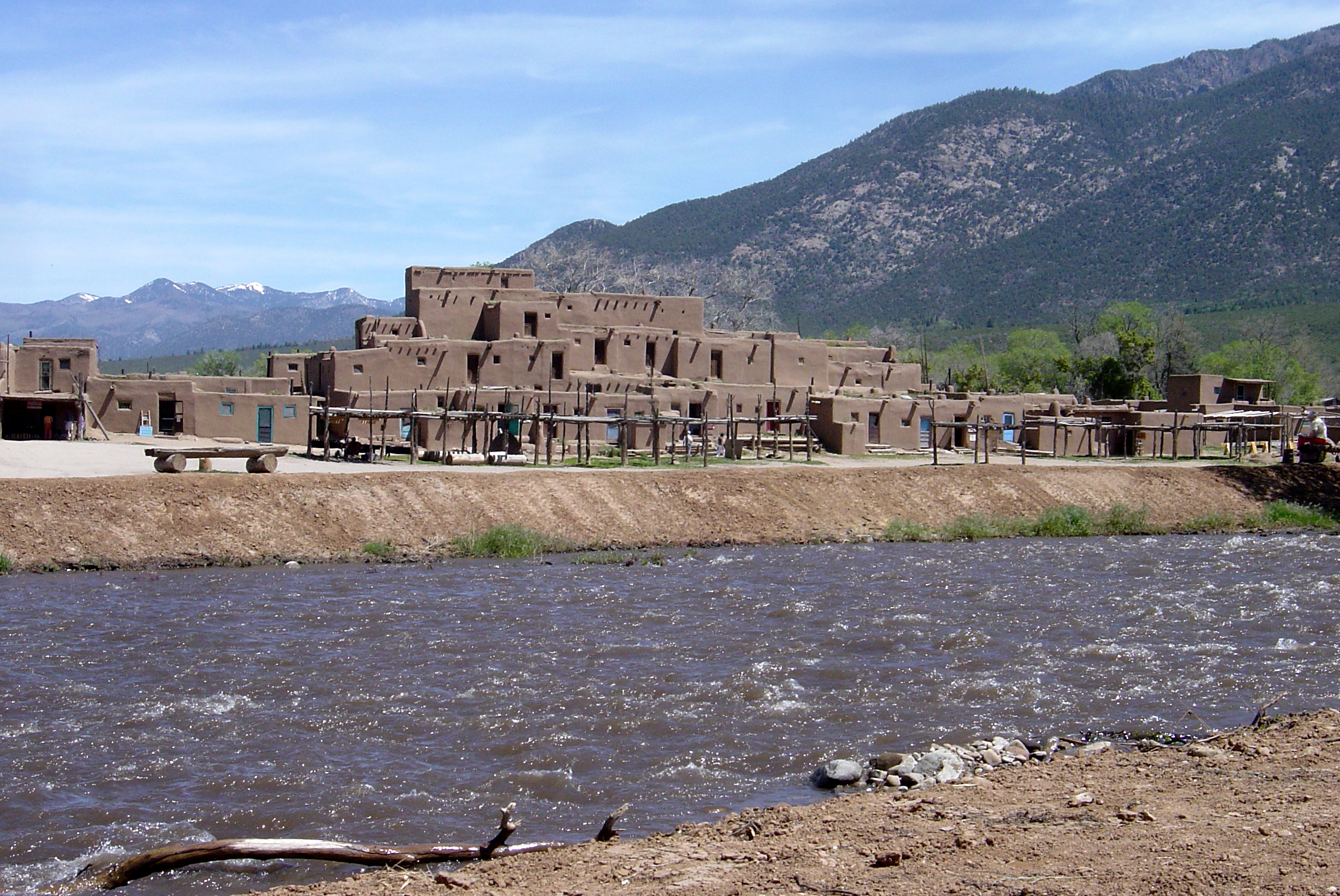
- Rio Pueblo de Taos at Taos Pueblo
- Native name: ȉaɫopháyp’ó’ona (Northern Tiwa)

Location
- Country: United States
- State: New Mexico
- County: Taos

Physical characteristics
- Source: Blue Lake
  - location: Taos Mountains
  - coordinates: 36°32′35″N 105°22′27″W
  - elevation: 11,312 ft (3,448 m)
- Mouth: Rio Grande
  - location: Rio Grande Gorge
  - coordinates: 36°20′21″N 105°43′50″W
  - elevation: 6,066 ft (1,849 m)
- Basin size: 380 mi^{2} (980 km^{2})
- Discharge
  - location: USGS gage 08276300, 5 miles above mouth
  - average: 61.2 cu ft/s (1.73 m^{3}/s)
  - minimum: 0.01 cu ft/s (0.00028 m^{3}/s)
  - maximum: 2,380 cu ft/s (67 m^{3}/s)

The Rio Pueblo de Taos, also known as Rio Pueblo (Northern Tiwa: ȉaɫopháyp’ó’ona, 'red willow creek'), is a stream in Taos County, New Mexico, United States that is a tributary of the Rio Grande. From its source in the Sangre de Cristo Mountains, it flows generally south and west to join the Rio Grande in the Rio Grande Gorge. The Rio Pueblo de Taos passes by the city Taos and through Taos Pueblo.

== Course ==
Photograph of the North Pueblo at Taos, across Rio Pueblo de Taos, by Edward S. Curtis, circa 1925

The Rio Pueblo de Taos originates at Blue Lake, about 2 miles (3.2 km) southeast of Wheeler Peak, the highest mountain in New Mexico. Several headwater tributaries drain the south and east slopes of Old Mike Peak, Lew Wallace Peak, and Red Dome. The river flows south for about 5 miles (8.0 km), then turns west. It is joined by La Junta Creek from the south, then Buffalo Grass Creek from the north. After flowing west for about 5 miles (8.0 km), and just downstream from the mouths of Frijoles Canyon on the north and Palo Encebado Canyon on the south, the Rio Pueblo de Taos abruptly leaves the mountains. Within a mile the river passes through the center of Taos Pueblo, then turns to flow southwest to the Rio Grande, passing just north of the town of Taos. The river's entire upper course in the mountains is within the Pueblo de Taos Indian Reservation.

Near Taos the Rio Lucero joins the Rio Pueblo de Taos from the north, after which the river flows by the historic Martinez Hacienda. Shortly below that the Rio Fernando de Taos joins from the south, after which the Rio Pueblo de Taos enters Taos Canyon. It is joined by Rio Grande del Rancho, which flows from the south through Ranchos de Taos, Arroyo Seco, from the north, then Arroyo del Alamo, from the south, after which it reaches the Rio Grande in the Rio Grande Gorge a few miles south of the Rio Grande Gorge Bridge. New Mexico State Road 567 crosses the Rio Grande via the Taos Junction Bridge just below its confluence with the Rio Pueblo de Taos. The area is part of the Orilla Verde Recreation Area.

== Names ==
In addition to Rio Pueblo de Taos and Rio Pueblo, the stream has been known by various other names, including Rio Taos, Taos Creek, Pueblo Creek, Ialap'aijpaana, Ja'lapa, Kipawai, T'awi'impo, and T'awipo.

== See also ==
- List of rivers of New Mexico
- List of tributaries of the Rio Grande
