= Taos Downtown Historic District =

Historic district in New Mexico, United States

- U.S. National Register of Historic Places
- U.S. Historic district
- NM State Register of Cultural Properties
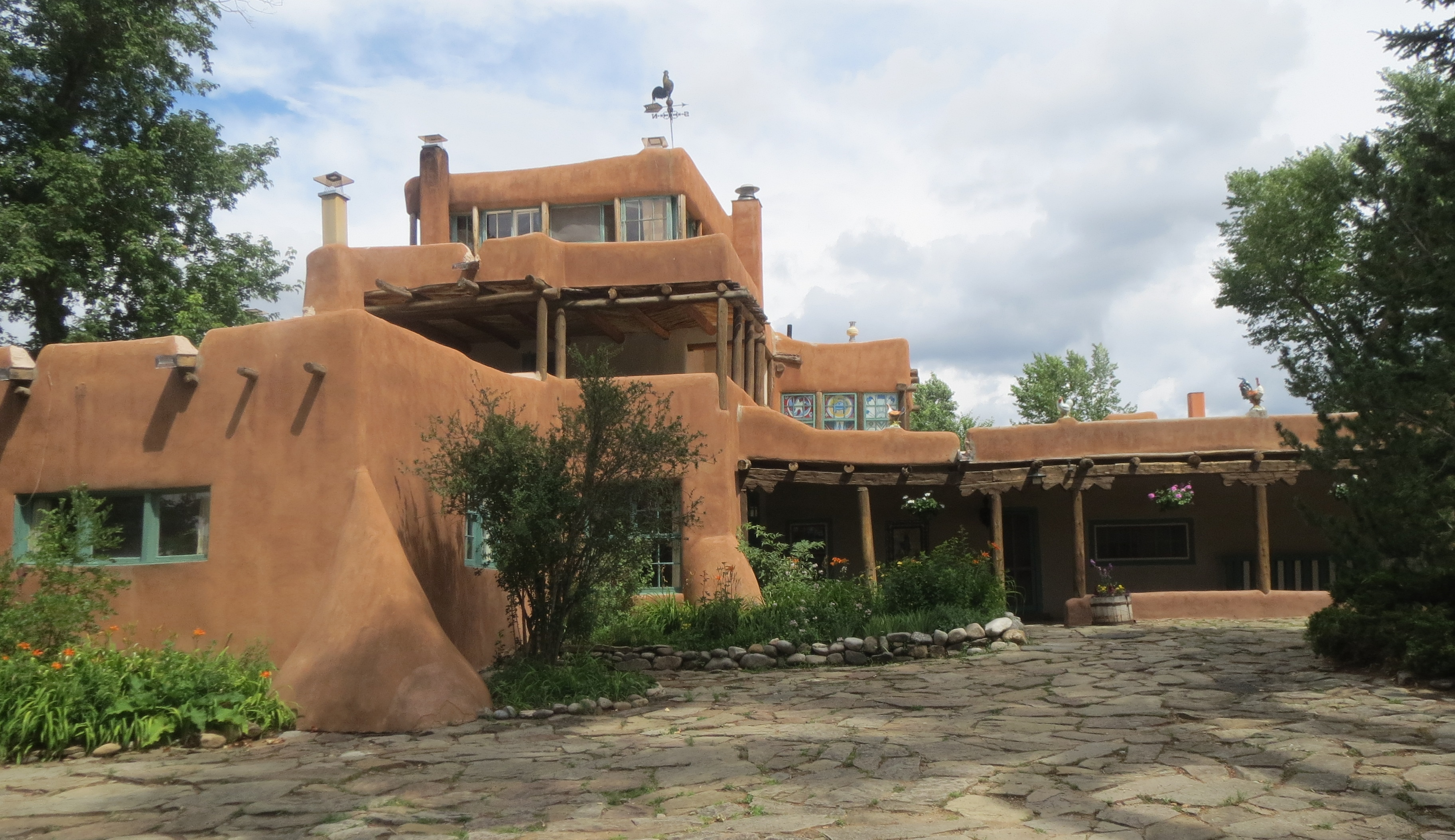
- Mabel Dodge Luhan House

- Location within New Mexico
- Location: NM 3 and NM 240, Taos, New Mexico
- Coordinates: 36°24′24″N 105°34′23″W
- Area: 30 acres (12 ha)
- Architect: multiple
- Architectural style: Late 19th And 20th Century Revivals, Colonial
- NRHP reference No.: 82003340
- NMSRCP No.: 860

Significant dates
- Added to NRHP: July 8, 1982
- Designated NMSRCP: April 15, 1982

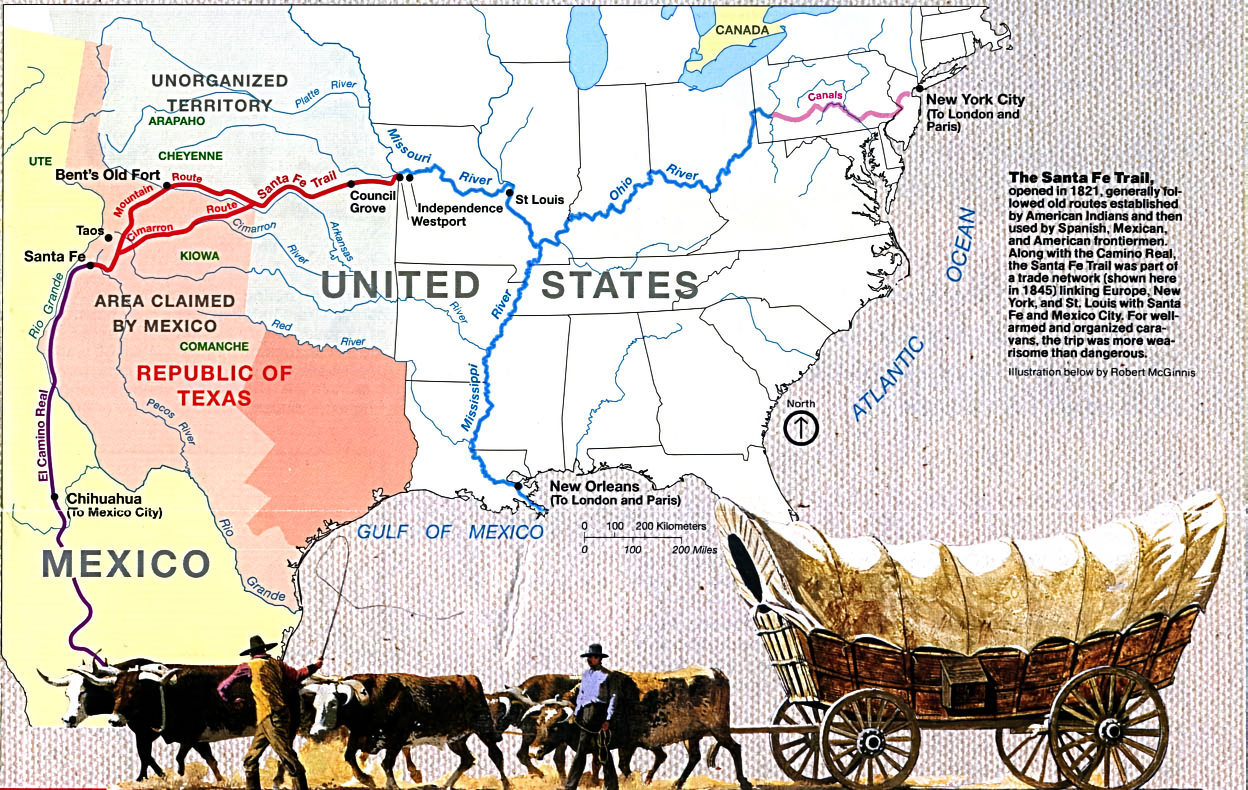
Map of Santa Fe Trail and El Camino Real Trail

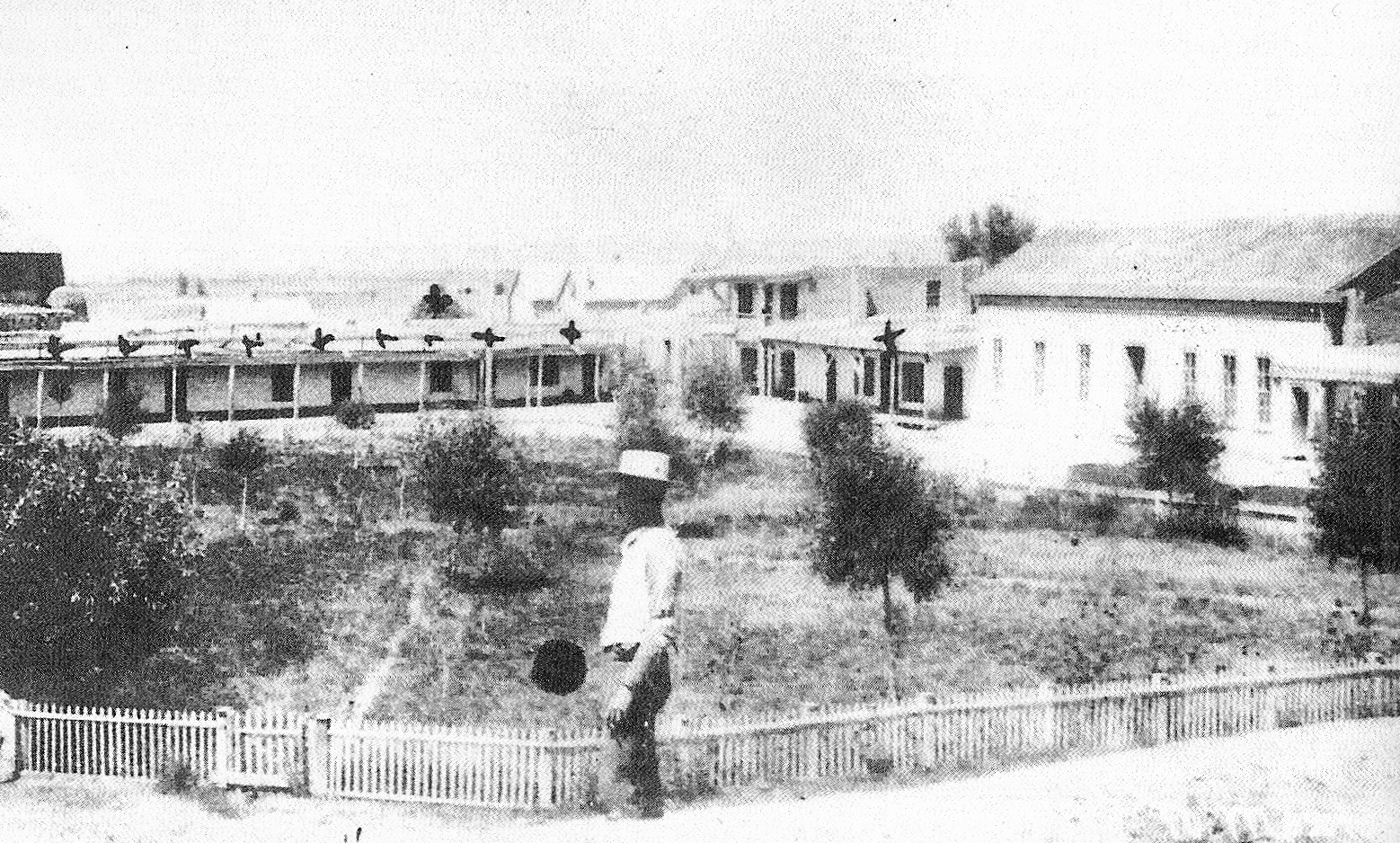
An 1883 photograph of the Taos Plaza taken from the southeast corner.

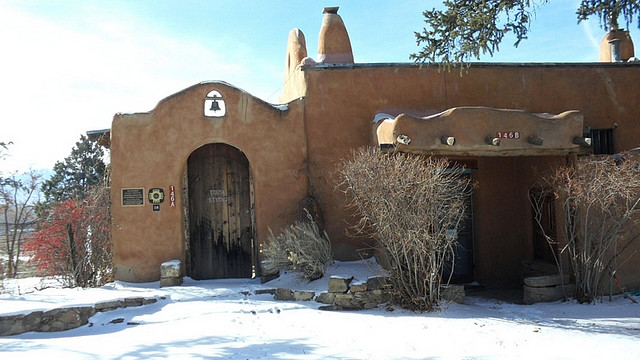
E. Irving Couse Studio, Taos

Taos Downtown Historic District is a historic district in Taos, New Mexico. Taos "played a major role in the development of New Mexico, under Spanish, Mexican, and American governments." It is a key historical feature of the Enchanted Circle Scenic Byway of northern New Mexico.

== Geography ==
Taos Downtown Historic District is located in the center of Taos, New Mexico. It is roughly bounded by Ojitos, Quesnel, Martyr's Lane, Las Placitas and Ranchitos Streets.

More broadly the area originally called Don Fernando de Taos (Note: The town name Don Fernando de Taos may be based upon King Ferdinand of Spain or a man named Fernando Vidalpando whose daughter, Marie Rose, was kidnapped by Comanches. Don Fernando de Taos was the name of the 1797 land grant that resulted in the founding of Taos.) is located in the Taos Valley, alongside Taos Creek and about 2 miles (3.2 km) south of Taos Pueblo. In the distance is Taos Peak.

== History ==
=== Native Americans ===
Arrowheads, potshards and pictographs found in the area provide evidence that Native Americans ranged through the Taos area about 6,000 years ago. About 900 years ago Pueblo people moved into the Taos and Picuris Pueblo areas.

=== Spanish settlement ===
Spanish conquistadors, led by Hernando de Alvardo, entered the Taos Valley in 1540. The area was settled by Spanish colonialists starting about 1615. What had begun as good relationships between the people from the pueblo and the settlers became contentious due to "brutal treatment" of the pueblo residents by the Franciscan missionaries, pressure to convert to Christianity, and demands to make tributes to encomenderos. Some of the colonists left the Taos area in 1840 after the Franciscan priest was killed. In 1661 some people returned to the still difficult situation. Due to the poor treatment of the residents of the pueblo, a revolt by indigenous peoples in 1680 resulted in the Spanish being driven out of the area. Sixteen years later the Taos valley was resettled by Don Diego de Vargas of Spain with a renewed and more respectful perspective. Spanish families settled in the Taos Plaza area and Ranchos de Taos. In 1710 the Spanish regained the territory.

For protection against attacks by Plains Indians, many people of Spanish heritage lived on, or built houses very near, the Taos Pueblo. Subsequently, concerned about the rate of intermarriage between the Spanish and people of the pueblo, the Spanish were asked to move at least "one league" away from the pueblo.

In 1779 the Battle of Cuerno Verde was led by Juan Bautista de Anza against the Comanches. Several tribal leaders and the chief were killed during the battle. As a result, the hostilities by that tribe subsided. In 1794 an order was initiated that prohibited Spanish, Negroes and mulattoes from living on pueblo lands. In addition, the General Indian Policy by Commandant General Teodoro de Croix resulted in a reduction in hostile attacks in the Taos Valley.

In 1796, (Note: There are different dates given for the Don Fernando de Taos Land Grant. According to the New Mexico Office of the State Historian, the grant was issued May 1, 1796. The following year water rights were given for access to excess water from the Lucero and Taos Rivers for crop irrigation. In 1799 a grant allowed for individual allotment of land for farming.) The Don Fernando de Taos Land Grant gave land to 63 Spanish families in the Taos valley, including the Taos Plaza which was then called Don Fernando de Taos. The settlement was built as a fortified plaza, with strong gates to enclose the settlement to protect the residents and livestock at threats of attack by Plains Indians. At each corner of the thick adobe walls of the plaza sentries stood guard for protection. Within the plaza, residents celebrated during fiestas, engaged in church festivities, and traded goods. It is now a central plaza surrounded by residential areas.

Taos was the most northern stop on the El Camino Real de Tierra Adentro, also known as the King's Highway, from Mexico City.

Mountain men who trapped for beaver nearby made Taos their home in the early 1800s. In December 1826 Kit Carson arrived and later married Josefa Jaramillo from Taos. At that time there were about 500 settlers in Taos. It was almost as important as Santa Fe and was the northernmost custom depot of the Spanish colonial settlements. As the Santa Fe Trail was established between the American territory of Missouri and Santa Fe, fur trade and goods trade developed in Taos for people of American, Spanish and Native American heritage. Santa Fe Trail traders included Charles Bent and William Bent who operated Bent's Fort. Goods produced in Taos included furs, blankets, and "Taos lightning", made from fermented wheat.

In 1826 Padre Antonio José Martínez began to serve the parish of Our Lady of Guadalupe. He also founded a newspaper, the first one west of the Mississippi, which was the precursor to the modern The Taos News.

In 1830 a building housing a jail and courthouse was built on the north side of the plaza. The Columbian and Don Fernando hotels, saloons and gambling establishments were built to accommodate the influx of visitors to Taos.

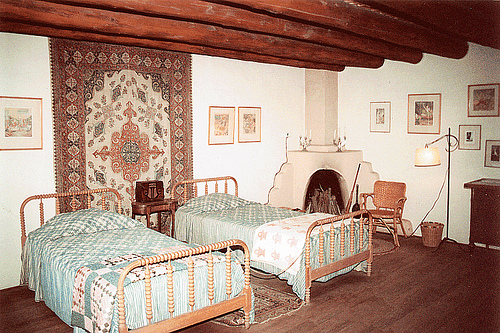
Blumenschein House Bedroom, 1989

Sites

- Taos Plaza
- Our Lady of Guadalupe Parish
- La Morada de Nuestra Senora de Guadalupe
- Kit Carson House

See also

- La Loma Plaza Historic District
- Martinez Hacienda
- Ranchos de Taos
- Taos Pueblo

=== American territory and settlement ===
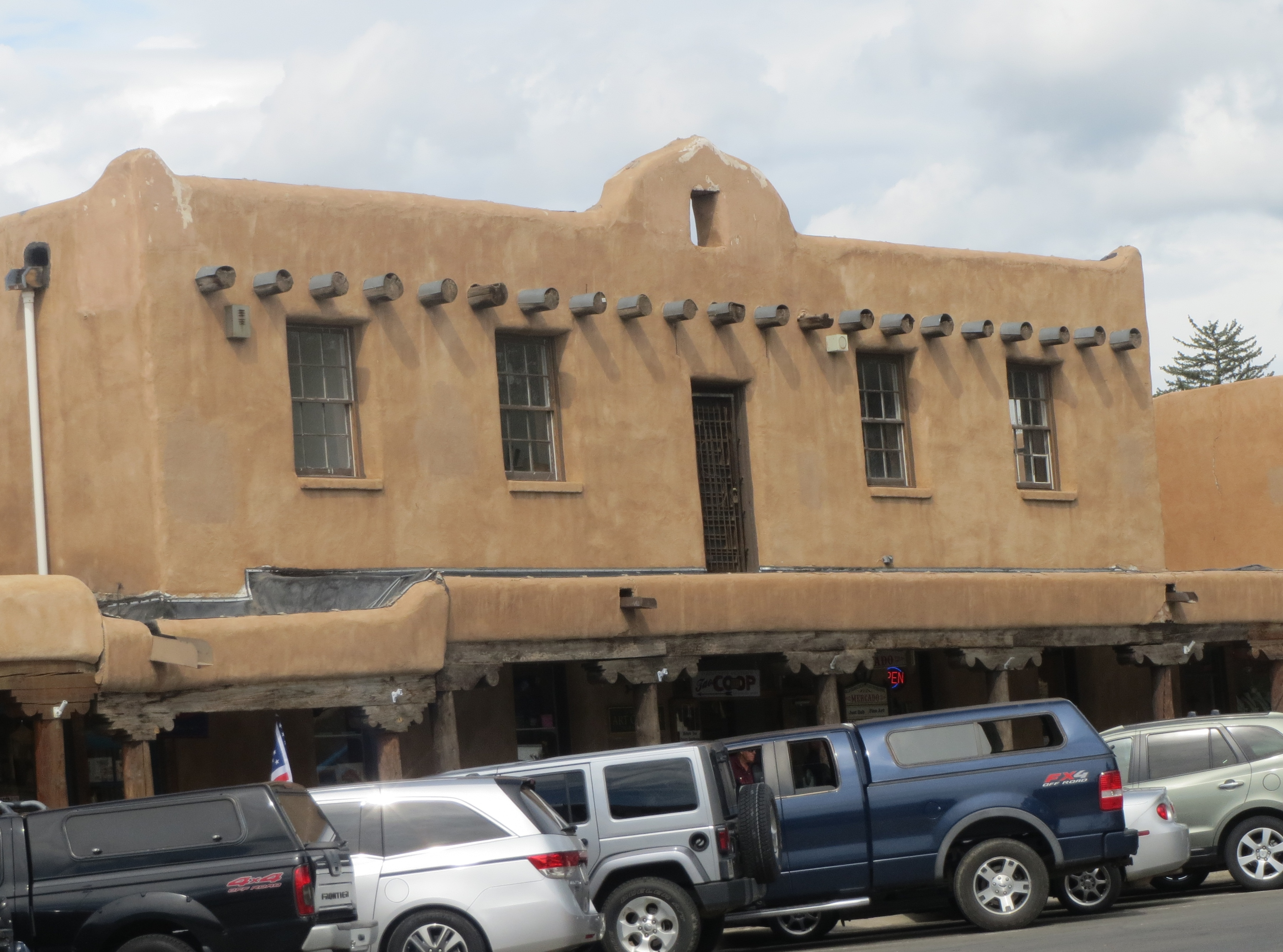
Former Taos Courthouse, built after 1930

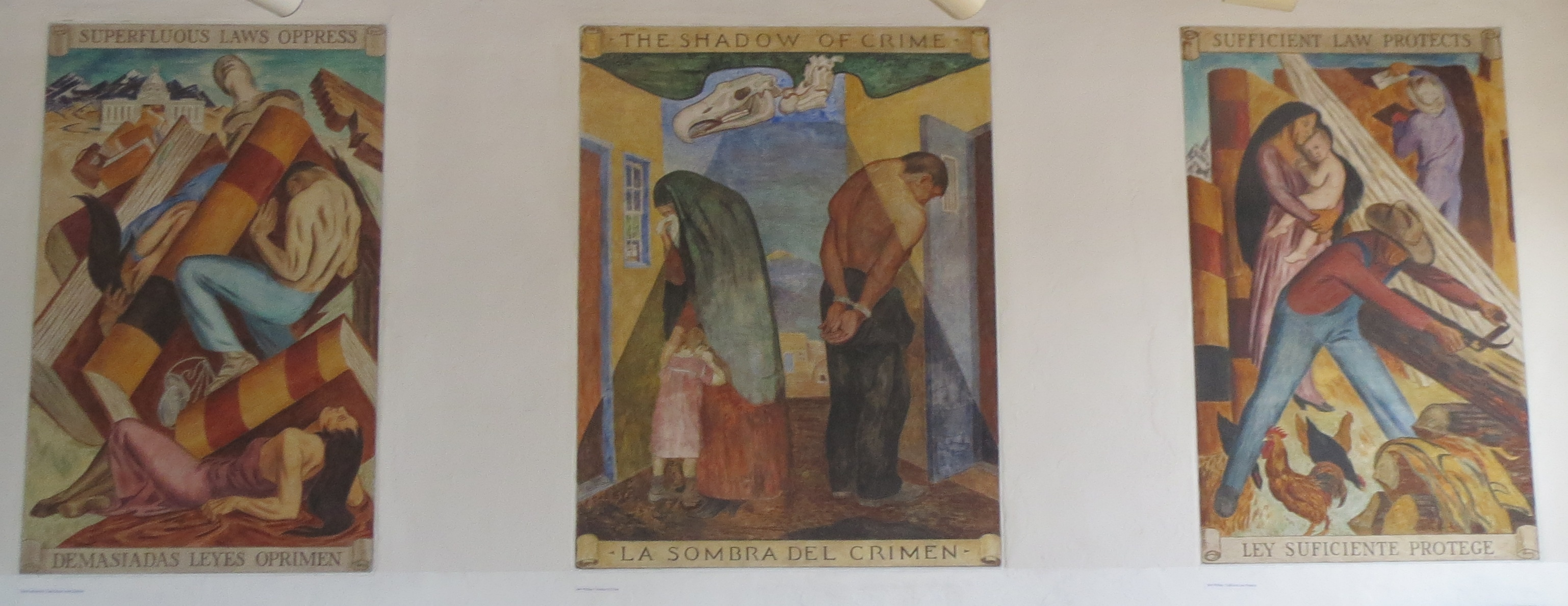
A few of the murals painted by members of the Taos art colony in 1933 and 1934: Bert Geer Phillips, Victor Higgins, Ward Lockwood, and Emil Bisttram

The United States took possession of New Mexico in 1847 (during the Mexican–American War). In retaliation, some former Mexican citizens and Taos Natives rebelled and during the Taos Revolt Charles Bent, the first territorial governor, was killed in his home. In response, the United States Army killed more than 150 people at the Taos Pueblo and destroyed the original San Geronimo Mission. In 1850, New Mexico and Arizona became an official territory of the United States.

Taos, one of the oldest Spanish settlements in the Taos valley, has examples of Spanish Colonial, Mission Revival, Pueblo Revival and Territorial architecture.

In 1930 several buildings on the plaza succumbed to fire, including the courthouse building and the Don Fernando Hotel. A new courthouse building was built and in 1933 and 1934 the Works Progress Administration funded the creation of murals within the courthouse. The frescoes were painted by Taos art colony members Emil Bisttram, Victor Higgins, Ward Lockwood and Bert Geer Phillips.

Sites

- Governor Charles Bent House
- Taos Inn

=== Taos art colony ===
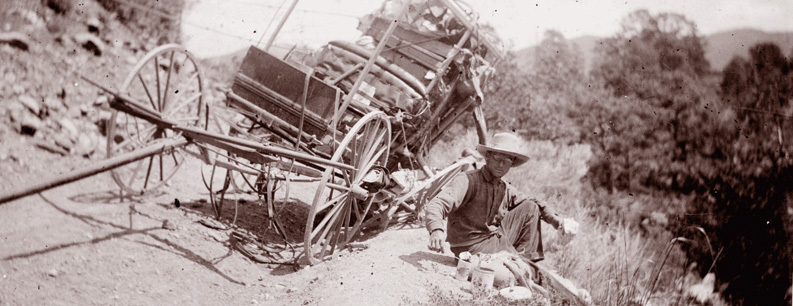
"Artists Bert Geer Phillips and Ernest Blumenschein stop to have a broken wagon wheel repaired, become enchanted with Taos and decide to stay. This event starts an immigration of artists that continues today."

In the late 19th century members of the Taos art colony settled in homes and studios around the plaza. The first of which were Bert Geer Phillips and Ernest L. Blumenschein who became "enthralled" by Taos scenery and clear light in 1898. The Taos Society of Artists was formed in 1912 with other artists who had moved to Taos.

Socialite Mabel Dodge Luhan arrived in Taos in 1917 and brought "creative luminaries" to the area, including Carl Jung, Georgia O'Keeffe, D. H. Lawrence, Thomas Wolfe, Willa Cather, Ansel Adams, Thornton Wilder, and Aldous Huxley.

Sites

- Ernest L. Blumenschein House
- Eanger Irving Couse House and Studio—Joseph Henry Sharp Studios
- Nicolai Fechin House
- Leon Gaspard House
- Harwood House
- Ernest Martin Hennings
- Mabel Dodge Luhan House
- Taos Art Museum

=== Hippie hang out ===
Inspired by the movie Easy Rider in which bikers "briefly discovered peace, creativity, and free love", Hippies arrived in Taos in the 1960s and 1970s and their residence influenced the culture of Taos.

== Gallery ==
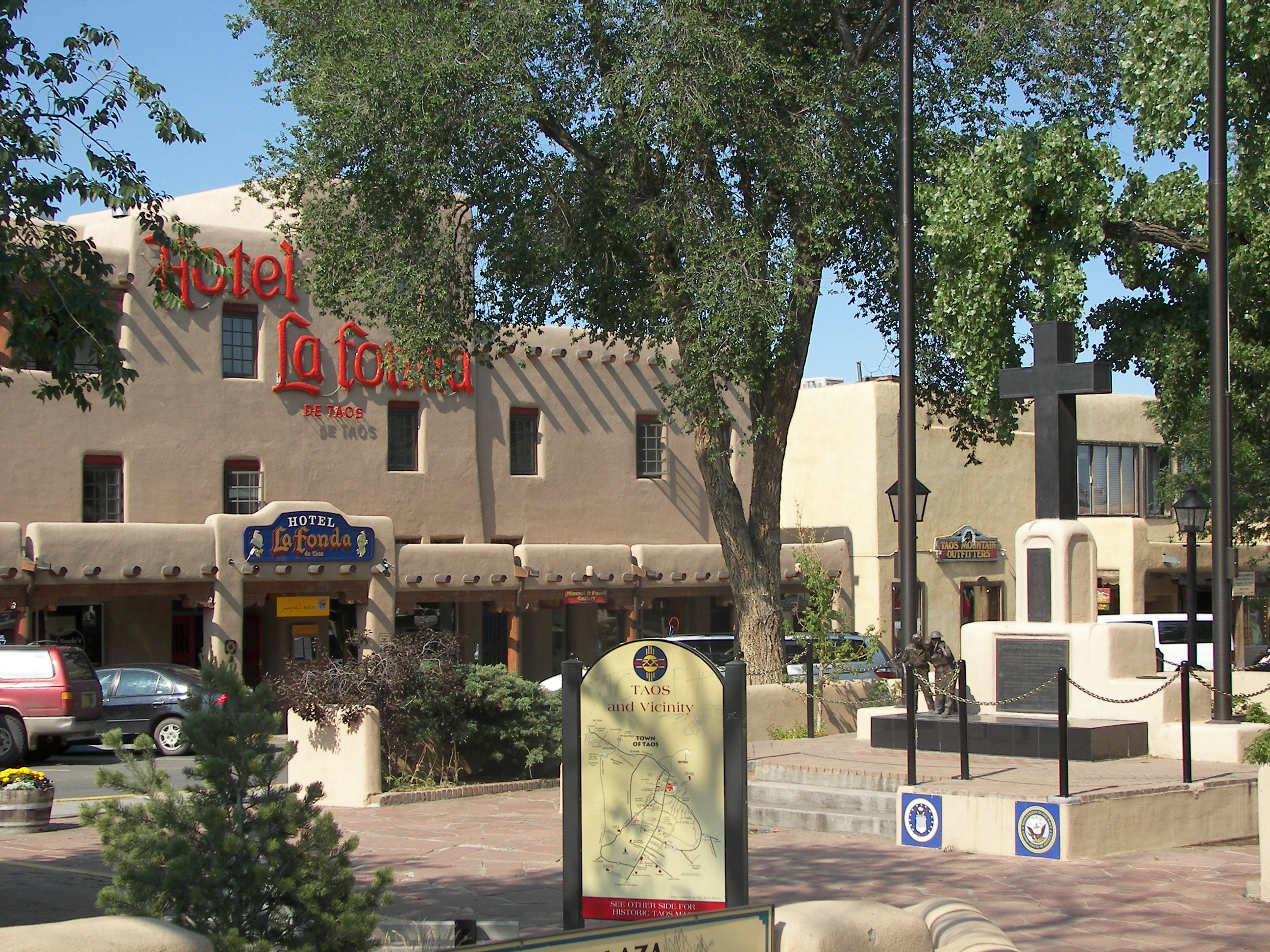
Taos Plaza and La Fonda Hotel, part of which was once the Bent and St. Vrain Store

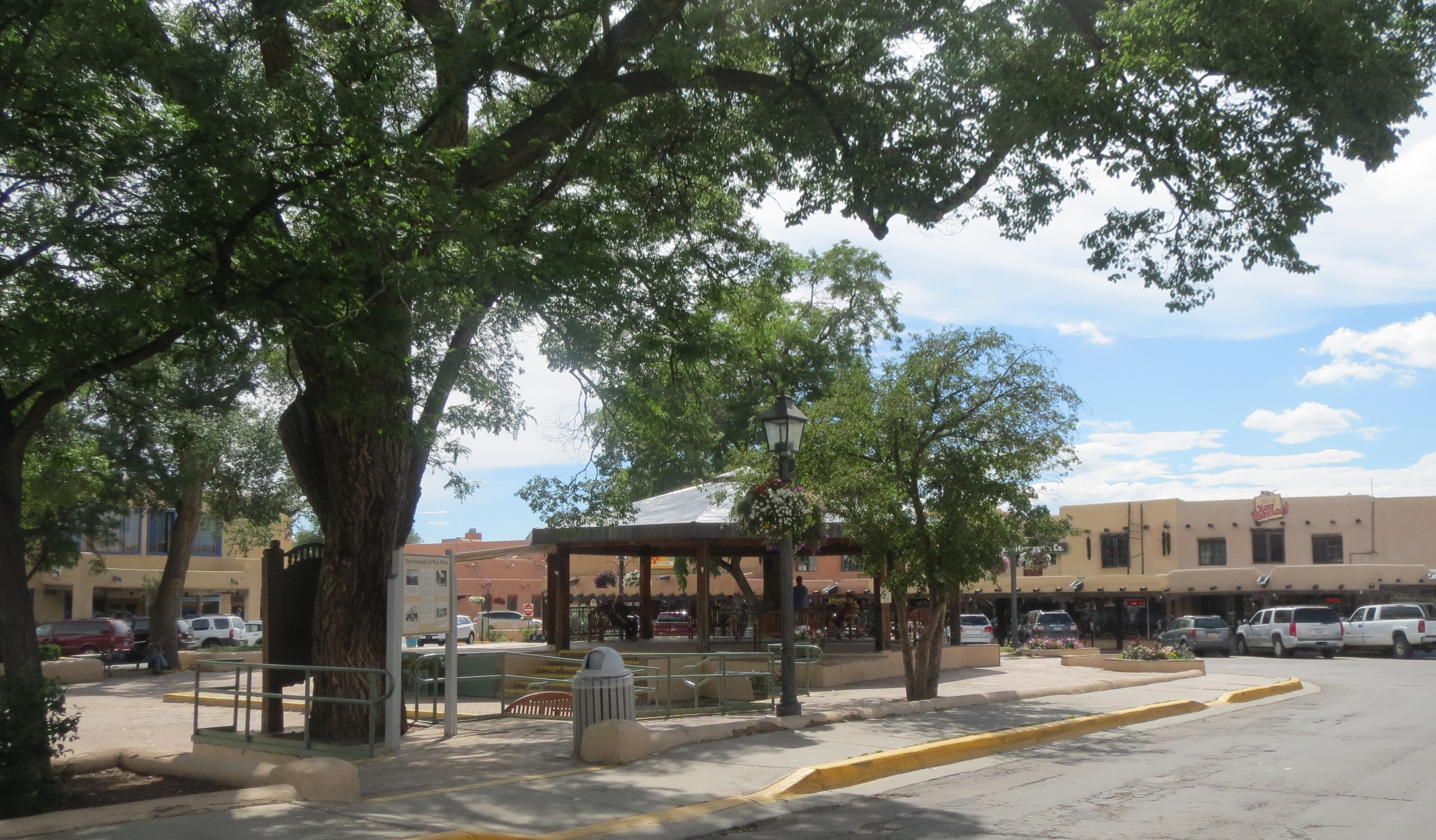
Taos Plaza

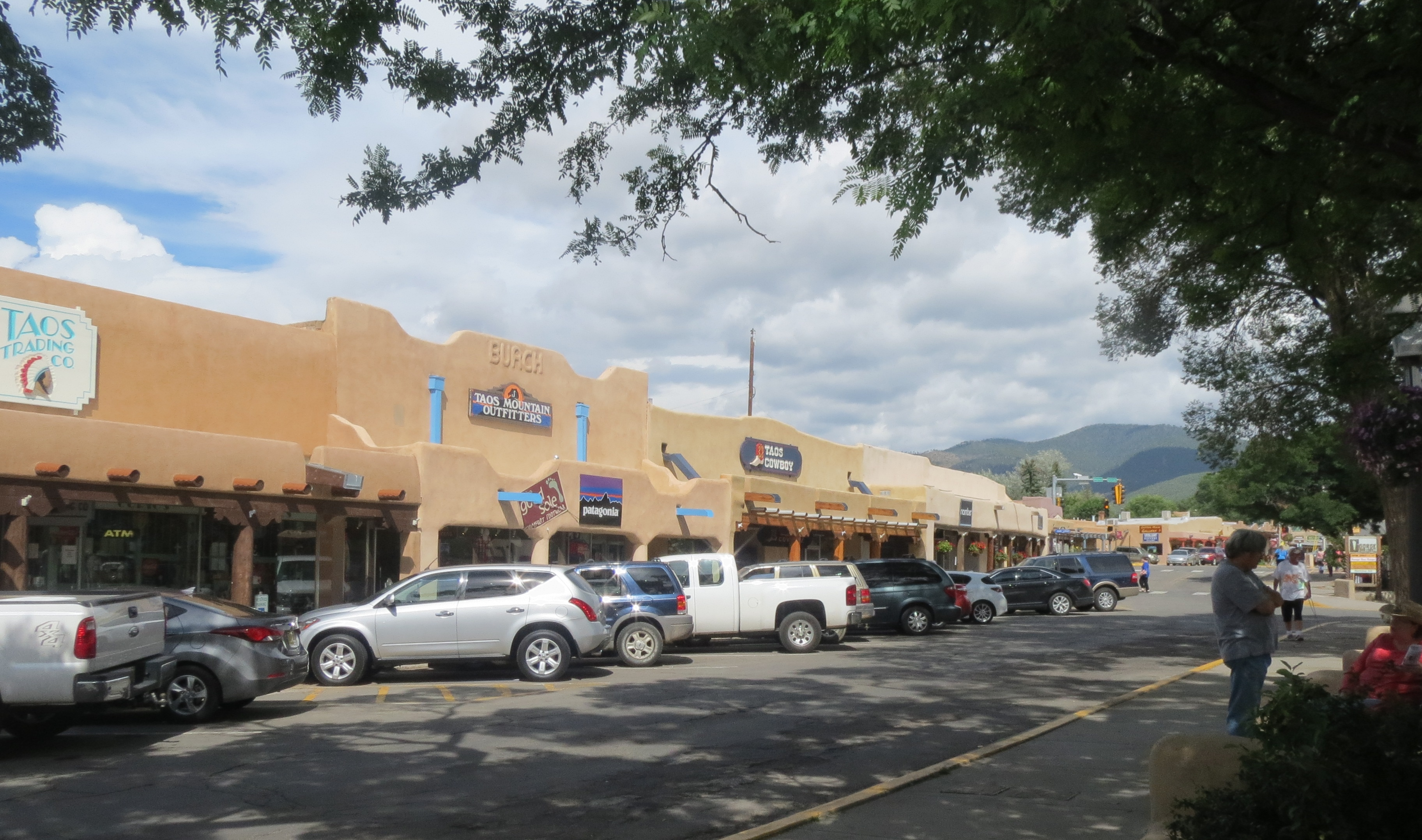
Taos Plaza

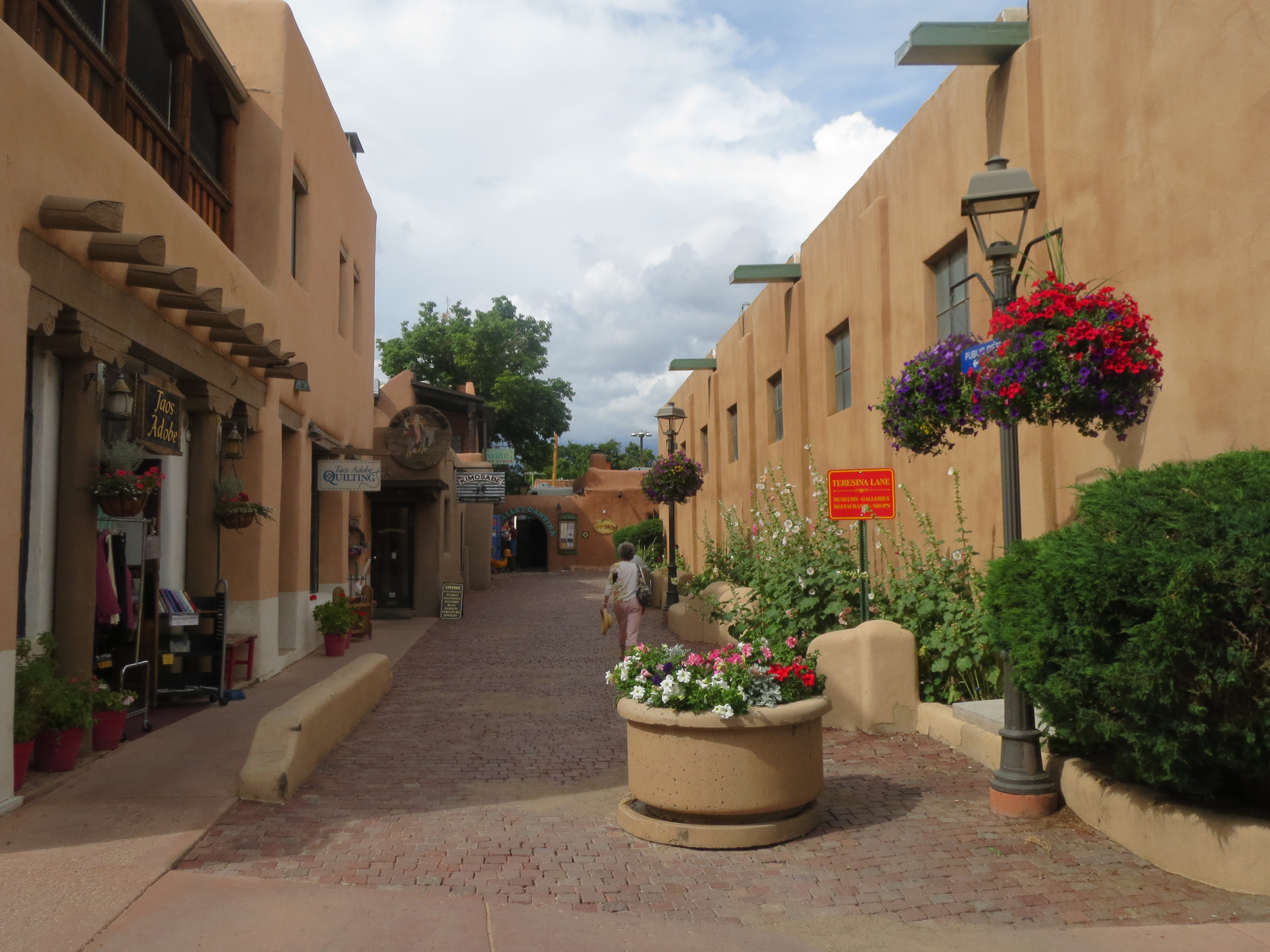
Alley off of Taos Plaza

== See also ==
- National Register of Historic Places listings in Taos County, New Mexico
