= Our Lady of Guadalupe Parish (Taos, New Mexico) =

Historic church in Taos, New Mexico

Coordinates: 36°24′29.03″N 105°34′32.67″W

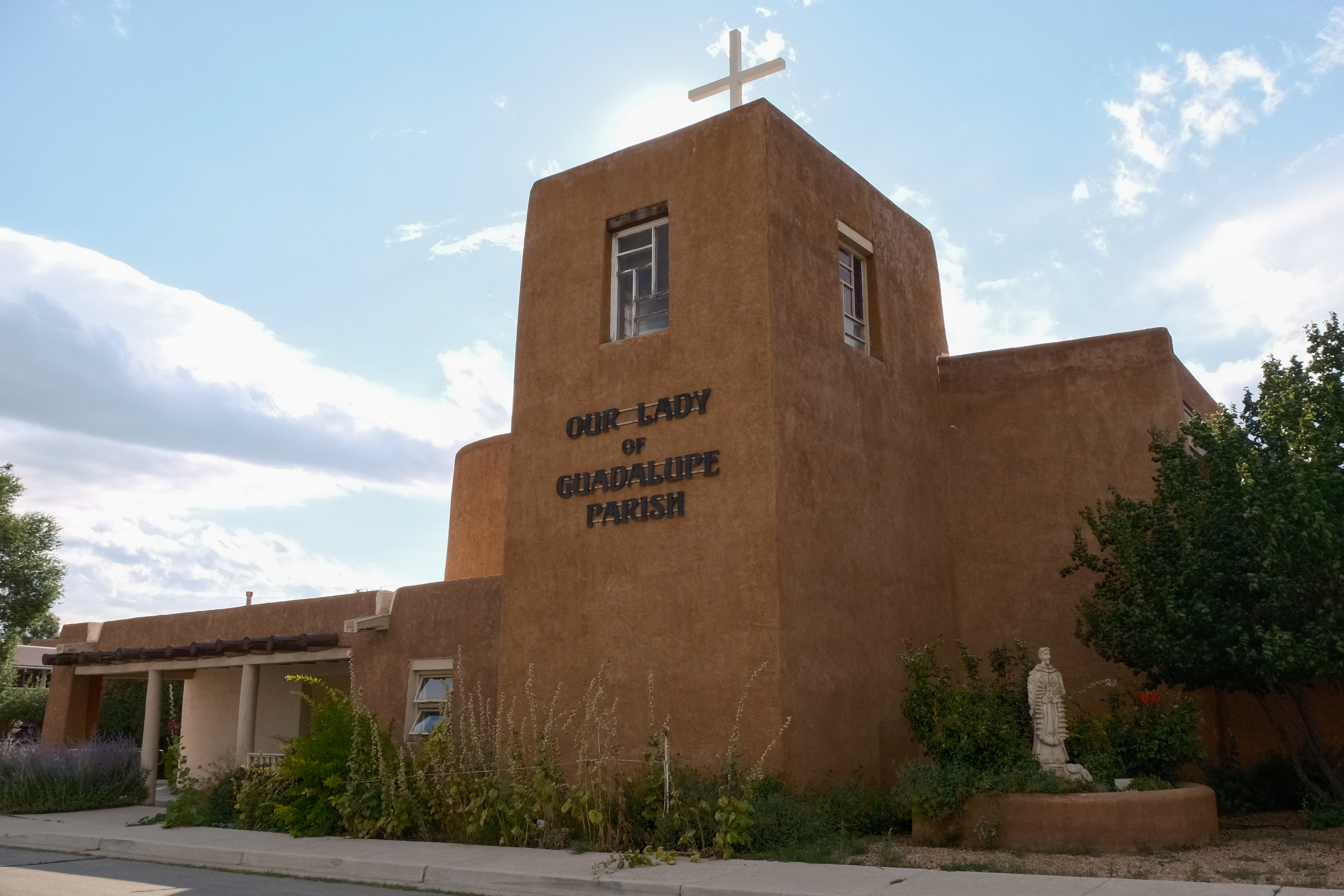
Our Lady of Guadalupe Parish

Our Lady of Guadalupe Parish or Nuestra Senora de Guadalupe is a historic church adjacent to the Taos Plaza at 205 Don Fernando Street in downtown Taos, New Mexico.

== History ==
Having received permission from Durango, Mexico's Bishop Olivares built the Nuestra Señora de Guadalupe church in Taos as a Franciscan mission of San Geronimo Parish at the Taos Pueblo beginning on November 18, 1801. It was completed in 1802 and had adobe walls 3 to 4 feet thick and a flat roof. Fray José Benito Pereyro, OFM, served the church.

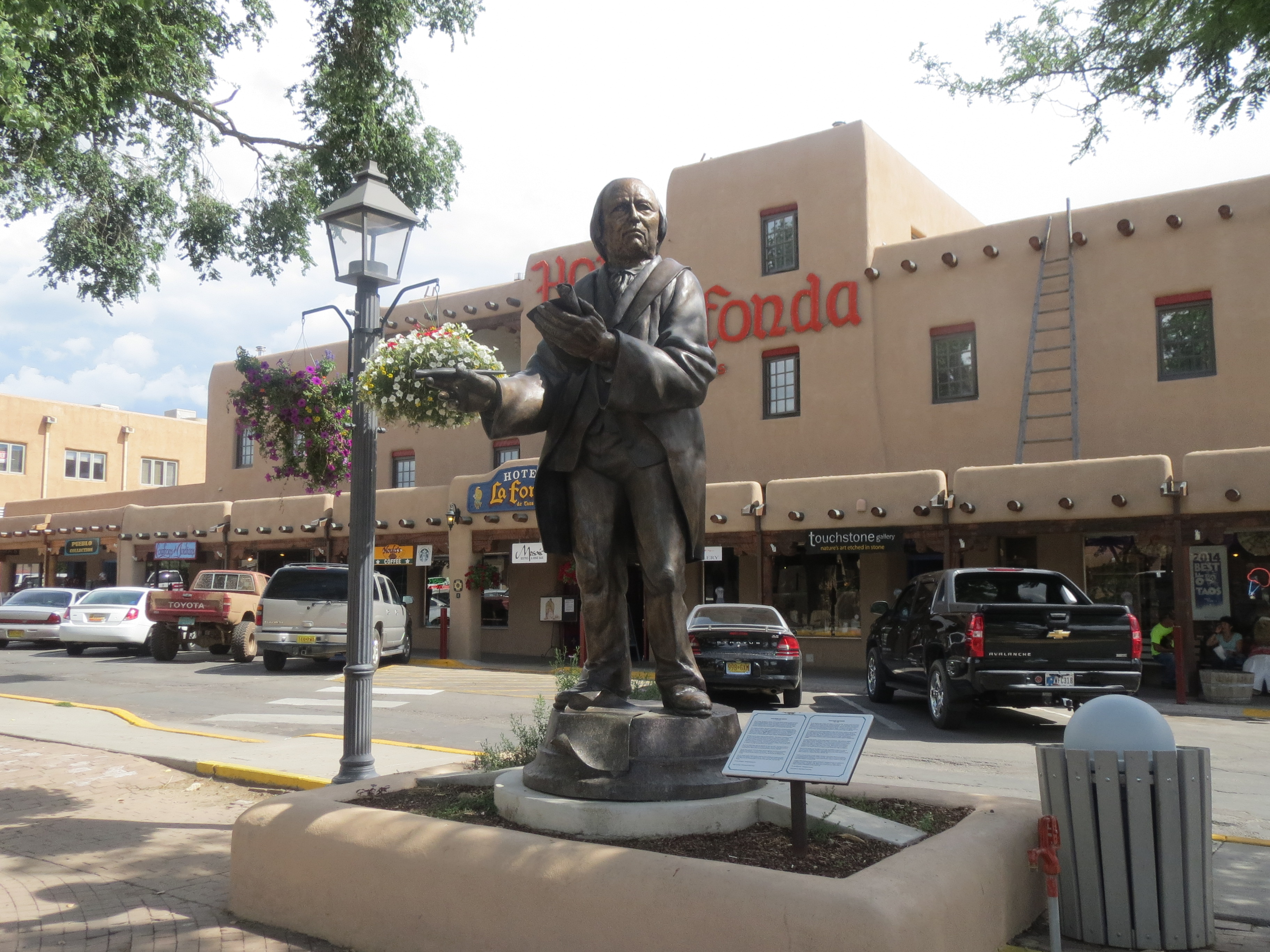
Sculpture of Padre Antonio José Martínez in Taos Plaza by Huberto Maestas

Padre Antonio José Martínez served the parish church beginning in August 1826. He was the first non-Franciscan priest. In 1833 it was commonly known as the "Padre Martinez church" and became a parish church under the patronage of Our Lady of Guadalupe by Bishop Zubiria of Durango. It was the first Our Lady of Guadalupe churches in what is now the United States. San Francisco de Asis Mission Church in Ranchos de Taos and San Geronimo Church at Taos Pueblo then became mission churches of the parish.

Martinez served the parish until 1857. About 1911, the parish building was considered to be irreparable and was demolished. A new church was built on the same site by John Baptist Pitaval, Archbishop of Santa Fe. It was organized by Father Joseph Giraud and was completed within the year. The parish was destroyed in an accidental fire on July 24, 1961.

A new church was built adjacent to the site of the former churches of southwestern adobe architecture with curved lines. It was dedicated December 1961 or on December 16, 1962 by Archbishop Edwin Byrne. Monsignor Charewicz was the parish priest until 1967. Father Robert Beach served the parish after Byrne.

Hung within each of the three churches has been a painting by Jose Santiago made in 1674 of Our Lady of Guadalupe that had been given to Padre Martinez as a gift.

In 2008 Our Lady of Guadalupe regained ownership of La Morada de Nuestra Senora de Guadalupe, a center of New Mexico Penitente Brotherhood, which was built on Taos Pueblo land.

== Overview ==
It is a parish church of the Archdiocese of Santa Fe and has missions at St. Jerome Church at Taos Pueblo, St. Theresa Chapel in El Prado, Immaculate Conception in Ranchitos, Our Lady of Sorrows in Cañon, New Mexico and San Antonio at La Loma Taos Indian Pueblo.

== Services ==
Masses are held daily.

== Feast Day ==
The feast day for the parish is December 12.

== Gallery ==
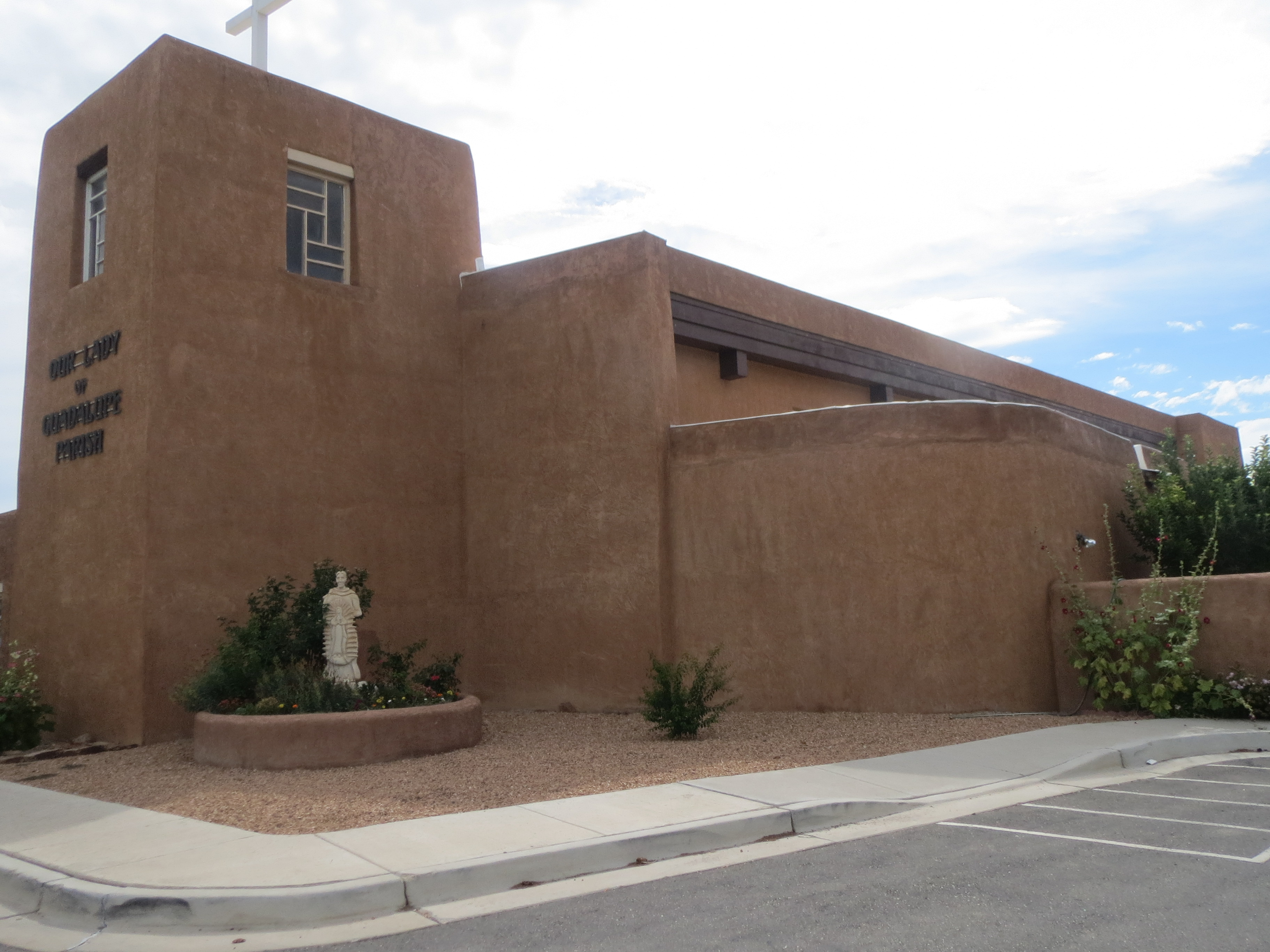

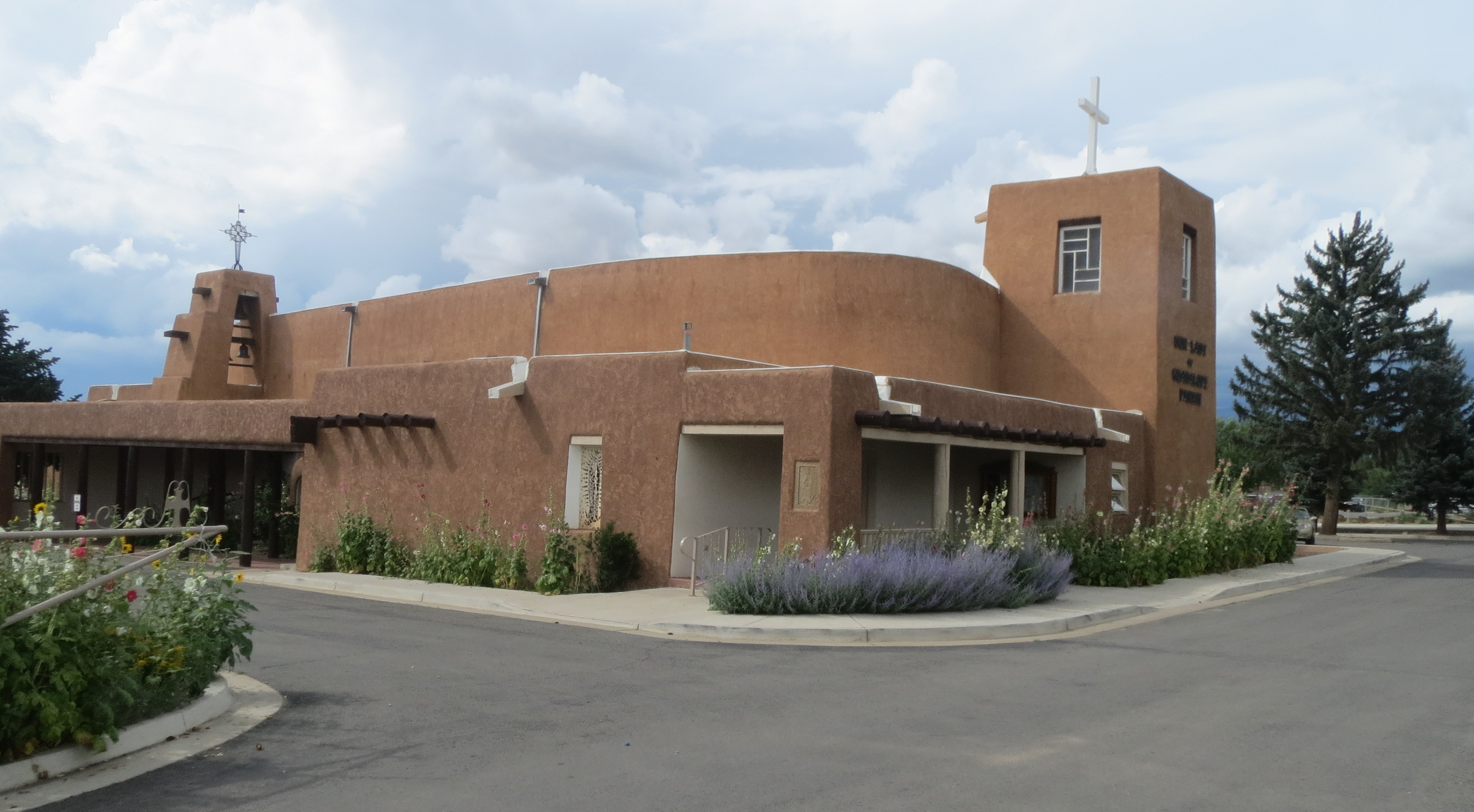
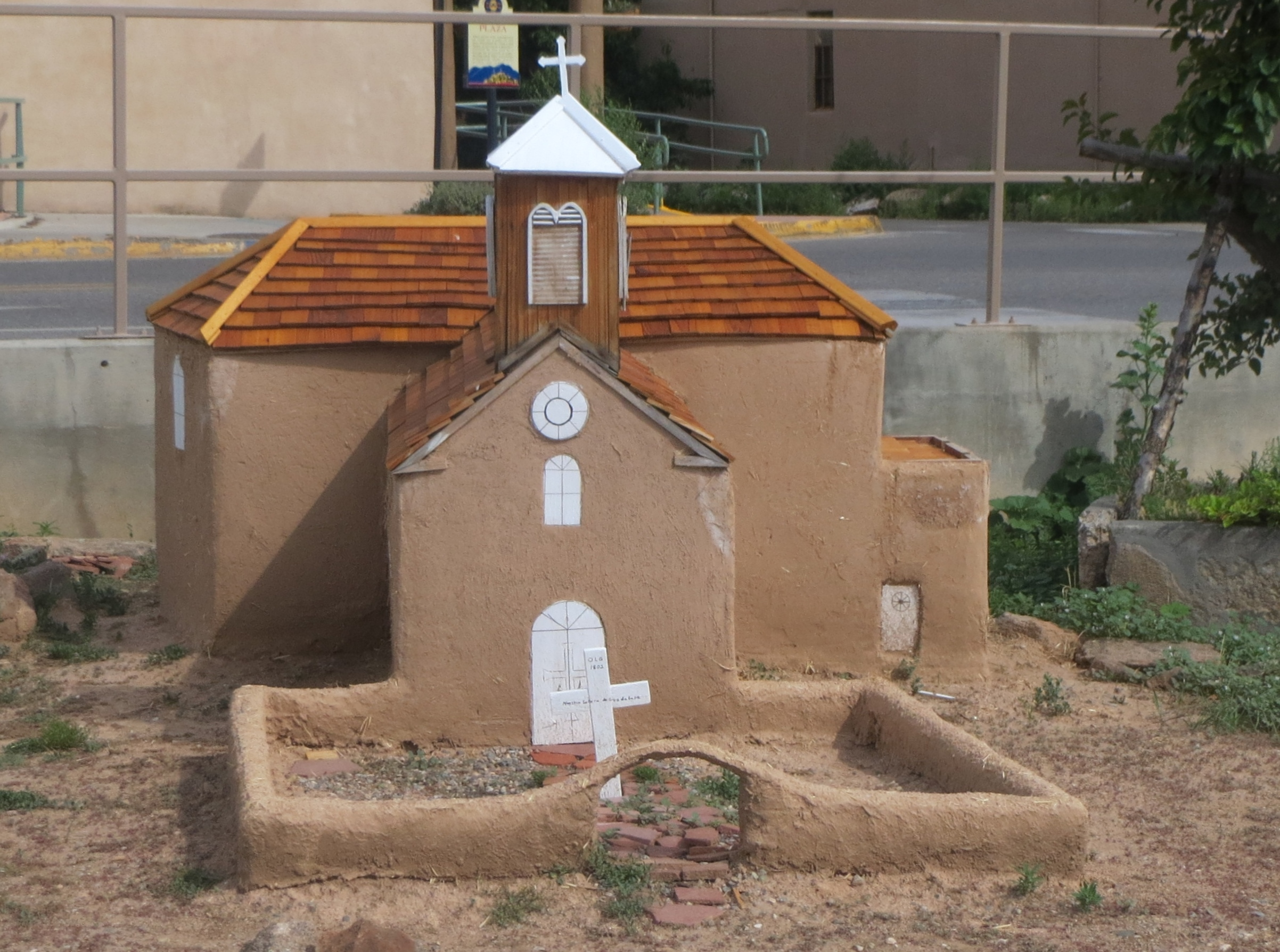
Model of second church

== See also ==
- Taos Downtown Historic District
- List of churches in the Roman Catholic Archdiocese of Santa Fe
