= Maestas =

Maestas is a surname. Notable people with the surname include:

- Huberto Maestas, American sculptor
- Moe Maestas (born 1968), American attorney and politician
- Roberto Maestas (1938–2010), American activist
- Francisco Maestas, plaintiff in the case, Maestas vs. George H. Shone
