= La Morada de Nuestra Senora de Guadalupe =

- U.S. National Register of Historic Places
- NM State Register of Cultural Properties
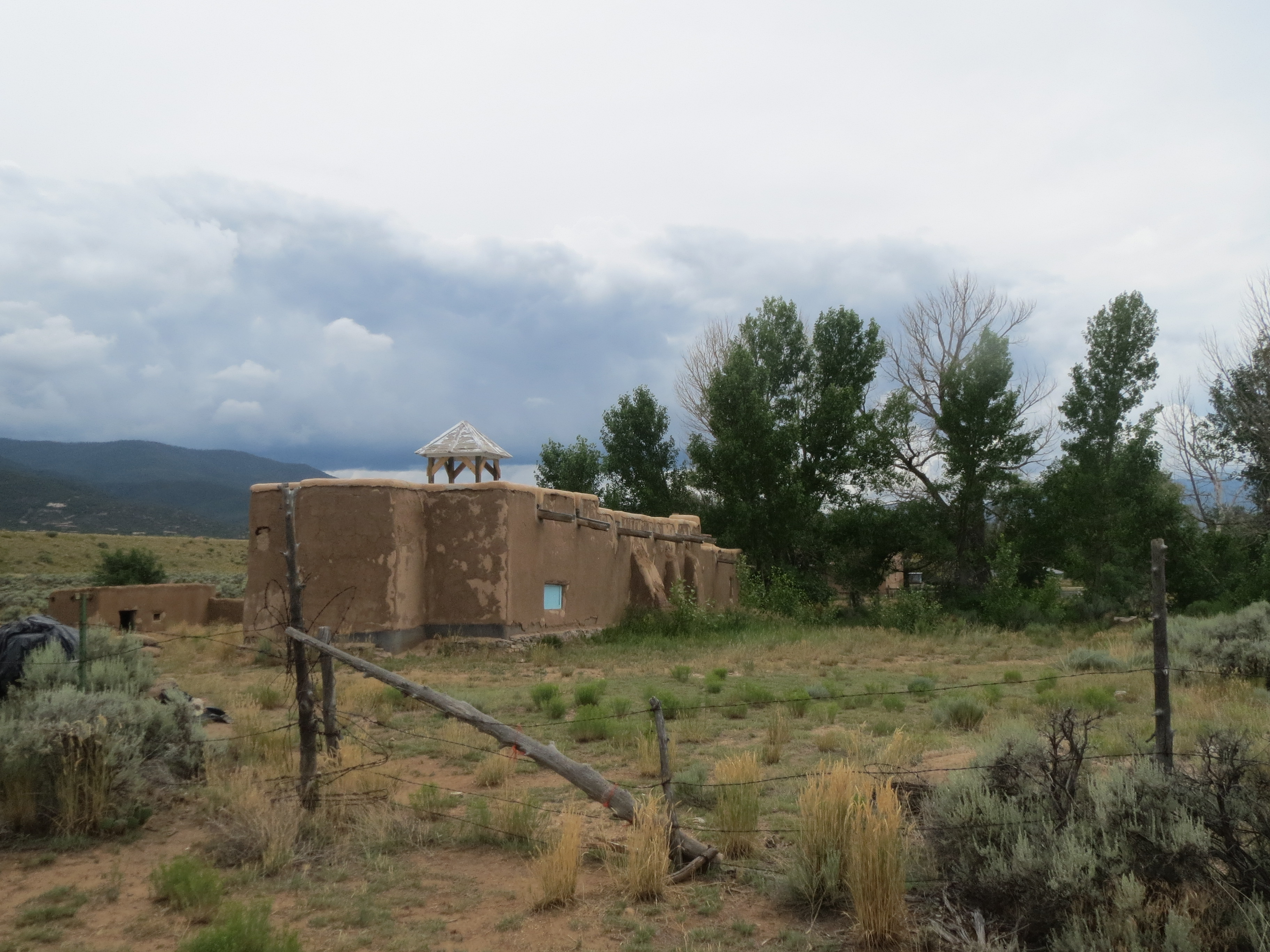
- La Morada de Nuestra Senora de Guadalupe

- Location within New Mexico
- Nearest city: Taos, New Mexico
- Coordinates: 36°24′22″N 105°33′46″W
- Area: 0.3 acres (0.12 ha)
- Built: 1895
- Architectural style: Pueblo
- NRHP reference No.: 76001201
- NMSRCP No.: 368

Significant dates
- Added to NRHP: June 29, 1976
- Designated NMSRCP: February 28, 1975

La Morada de Nuestra Senora de Guadalupe, also known as Taos Morada, is a holy site and past home of La Fraternidad Piadosa de Nuestro Padre Jesús Nazareno in Taos, New Mexico. The Penitent Brothers, or the Hermanos Penitentes used the Morado for religious study of ancient Catholic lay religious practices.

== History ==
Land was granted for Taos Morada and the Calvario in 1797 to 1798 by the religious and administrative officials of the Taos Pueblo. The property was to be used by Hermanos for religious purposes. Taos Morada was fully completed in 1834 and was led by Padre Antonio José Martínez. From the 1800s it was a center of Hermanos' religious activity, based upon practices that originated in Spain.

By the 1970s there were only a few remaining Hermanos. In 1977 Taos Morada was sold to the Kit Carson Memorial Foundation against the wishes of Taos clergy, parishioners and Hermanos.

It was listed on the National Register of Historic Places and received monies from the National Park Service, the state Historic Preservation Office, and CETA funds for the restoration of Taos Morada to its state during the mid-19th century. The restoration, though, did not allow for religious devotions by Hermanos. In 2005 the museum board agreed to sanction certain devotional exercises, which began April 11, 2006 during Holy Week for Hermanos from Northern New Mexico Moradas. In or after 2008, the Morada became the property of the Catholic Our Lady of Guadalupe Church in Taos and the Archdiocese of Santa Fe. In 2010 a statement by an archbishop claimed that no Hermanos services would be held until he consecrated it.

In 2013 it was reported that the grounds are open to the public, but the building interior is private.

== Gallery ==
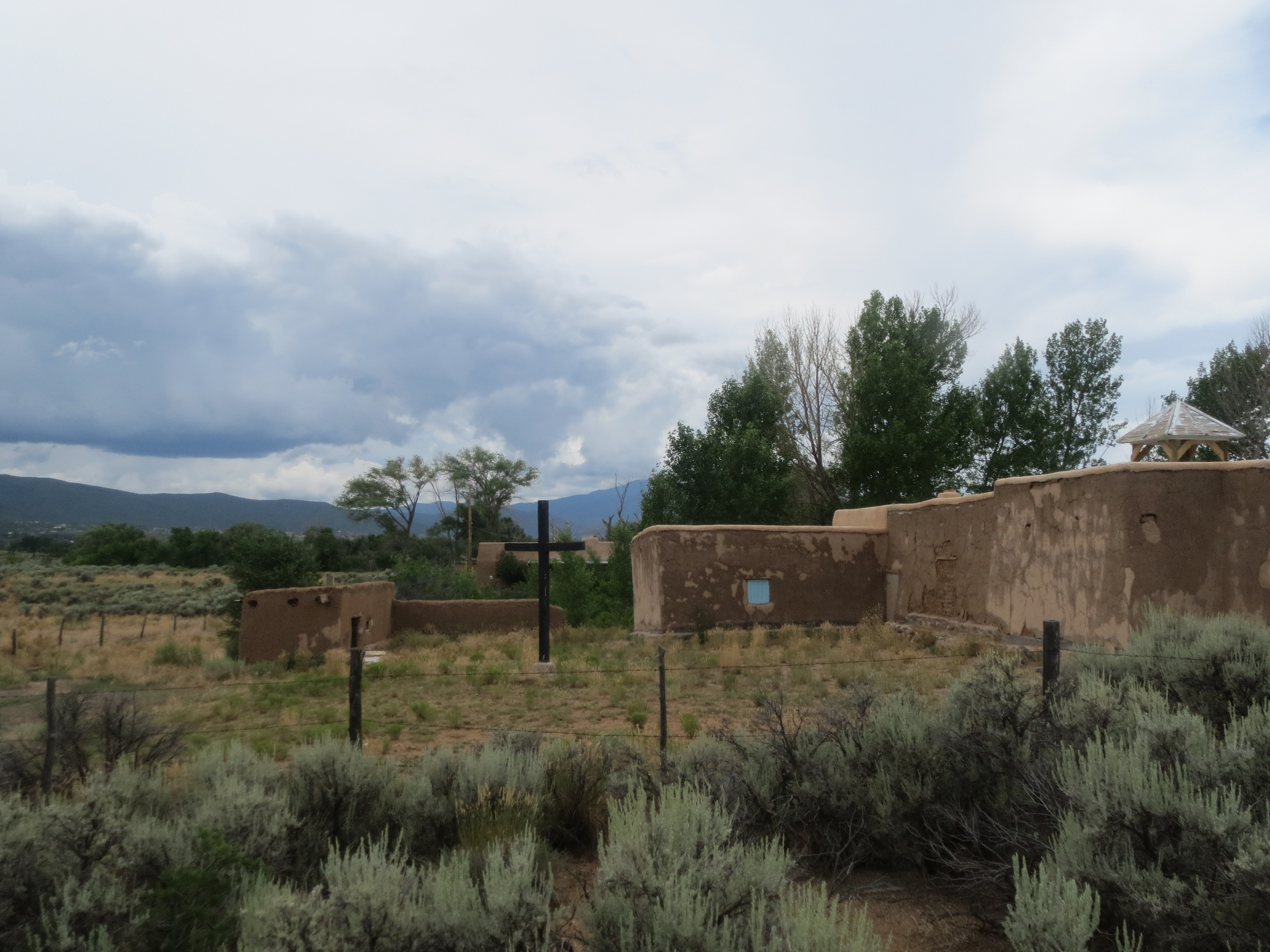

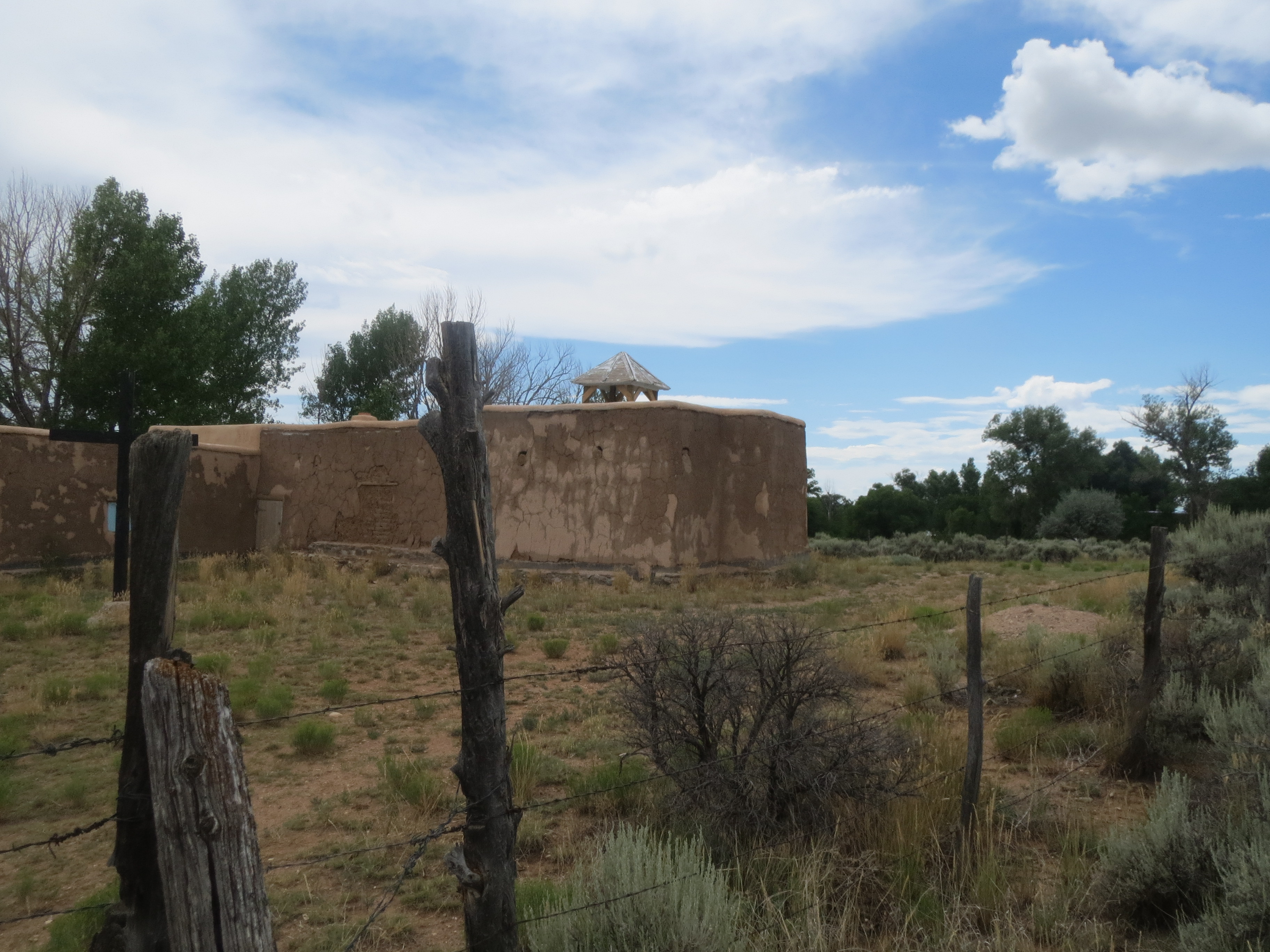

== See also ==
- National Register of Historic Places listings in Taos County, New Mexico
- Penitentes (New Mexico)
