= Ward Lockwood =

American painter (1894–1963)

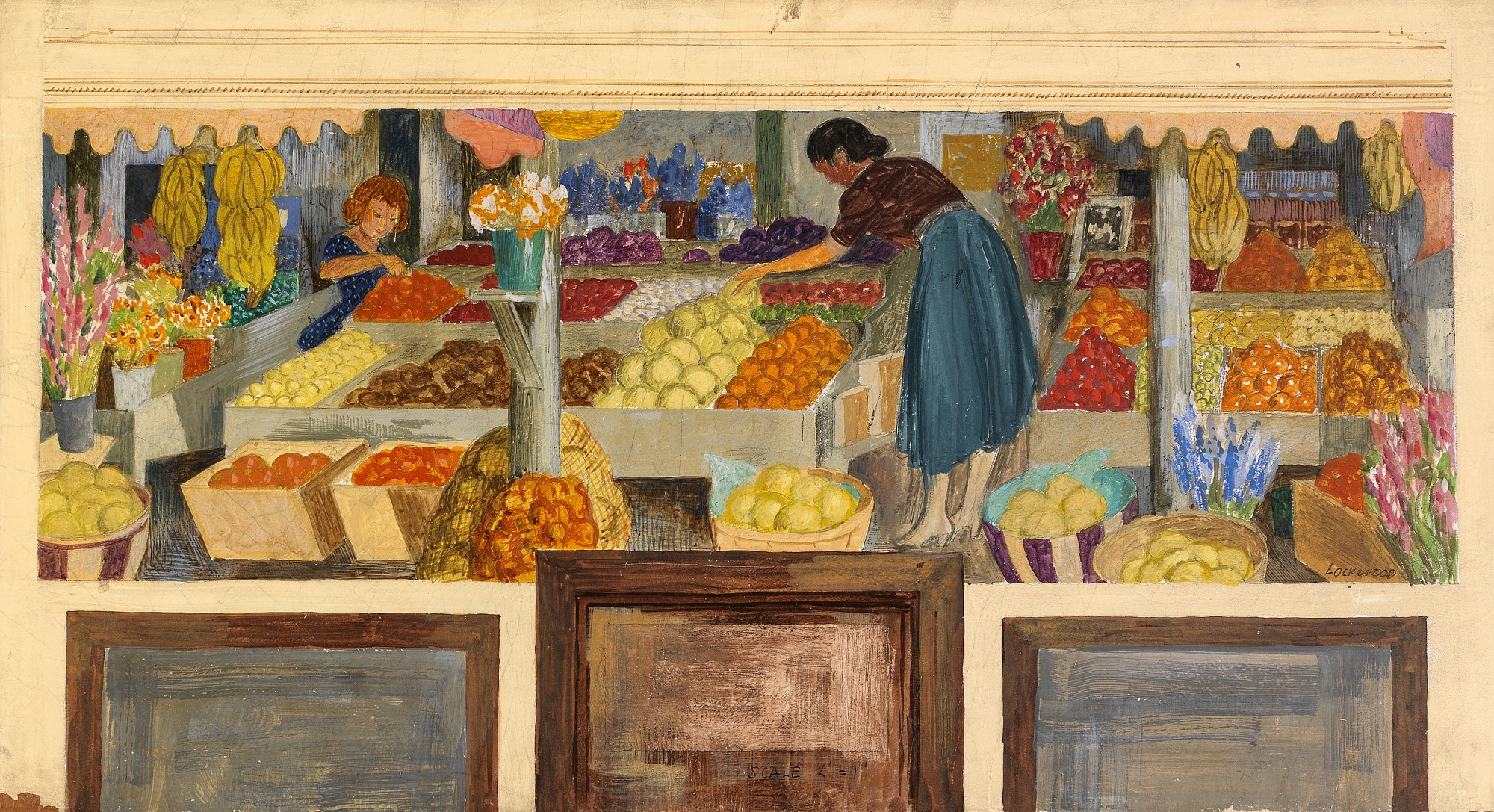
Harvest of the Rio Grande Valley (mural study by Ward Lockwood for Edinburg, Texas Post Office)

John Ward Lockwood (September 22, 1894–July 6, 1963) was an American painter, art teacher and veteran of two world wars.

During the New Deal era of public artwork commissions for new federal buildings, Lockwood was hired by the Treasury Department Section of Painting and Sculpture to paint murals at the new post office buildings in Edinburg, Texas, and Hamilton, Texas, as well as at Taos County Courthouse, Colorado Springs Fine Arts Center, in the lobby of the federal courthouse in Wichita, Kansas, and in a courtroom at the federal courthouse in Lexington, Kentucky. He also created two murals for what was then the Post Office headquarters building in Washington, D.C.

Lockwood wrote that the mural in the Hamilton post office, Texas Rangers Singing in Camp, was “the most popular one I have done.” The murals in Colorado Springs, on theme of “classic American theater,” will be removed sometime during or after 2022, “due to racist imagery and damage accumulated from their location in a food service area.” The Post Office (now Clinton Federal Building) murals were challenged for their depiction of Native Americans in the early 2000s.

Lockwood advocated strongly for the only abstract art post office mural that was ever commissioned by the Section, Lloyd Ney’s New London Facets in New London, Ohio.

He studied at the University of Kansas, Pennsylvania Academy of Fine Art, and Academy Ransom in Paris. He taught art at both UC Berkeley and the University of Texas.

The Norton Simon Museum in Pasadena hosted a show of his work in 1960, one of more than 30 one-man shows of his work.

Born in Atchinson, Kansas, he served in both the 89th Division of the American Expeditionary Force during World War I and in the Army Air Corps during World War II, retiring as a lieutenant colonel (possibly full colonel) in 1954. Involved with the Taos Artists Colony in the 1920s and 1930s, he died in Taos, New Mexico shortly after his retirement.

His wife was Martha Clyde Bonebrake (1891–1969).
