= Taos Plaza =

Historic plaza in Taos, New Mexico

Coordinates: 36°24′26″N 105°34′28″W

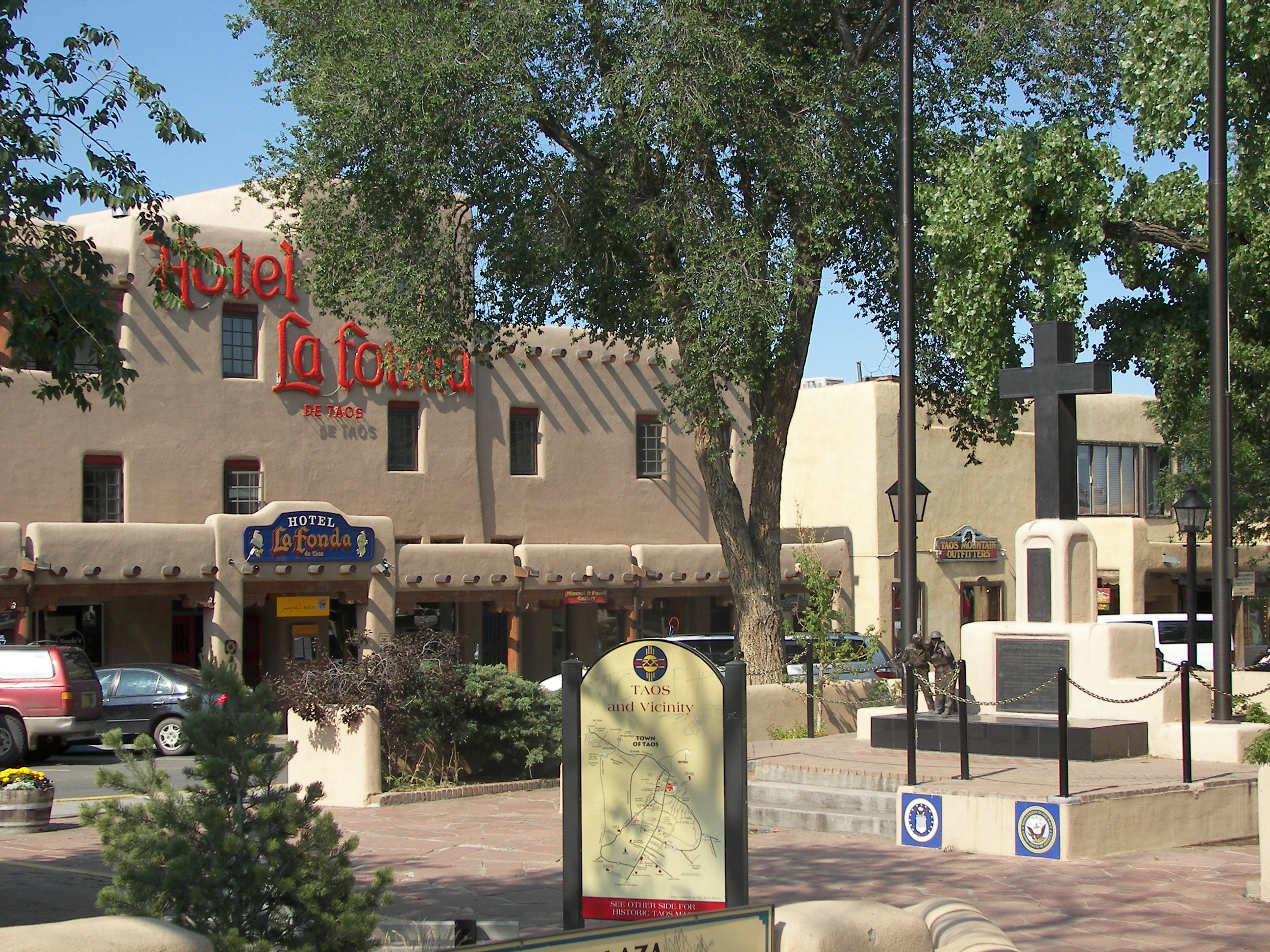
Taos Plaza and the Hotel La Fonda

Taos Plaza is a center of shops and monuments within the Taos Downtown Historic District in Taos, New Mexico.

== Overview ==
The Taos Plaza is the historic center of the town of Taos. Once a Spanish fortified walled plaza with houses and businesses, it now has a park with shady trees, park benches, and a gazebo surrounded by retail businesses made of adobe. An anchor of the plaza is the Hotel La Fonda de Taos, which has a small museum of D.H. Lawrence paintings and a restaurant named Joseph's Table with hand-painted floral murals. There is metered parking within the plaza and shopping includes galleries of Native American art and jewelry and souvenir shops. The old courthouse and historic Taos jail are located on the north side of the Plaza.

It is the central point for a walking tour of the Taos Downtown Historic District, which includes the Ernest L. Blumenschein House, Harwood Museum of Art, Governor Charles Bent House, Taos Inn, John Dunn House, Taos Art Museum, and the Nicolai Fechin House.

It is located immediately west of the intersection of US 64 (Kit Carson Road) and NM 68. Taos County owns and manages it.

== History ==
Located in Taos, New Mexico. Spanish settlers began colonization of the Taos Valley in 1616, but the Plaza dates to the late 18th century when the Don Fernando de Taos Land Grant was ceded to Spanish settlers from the Taos Pueblo in 1796 by Don Fernando de Chacon, Governor of New Mexico. It and the Taos Pueblo were the terminal points of the Camino Real de Tierra Adentro, or King's Highway, from Mexico City.

Taos Plaza served for decades as the central meeting place in the valley and survived numerous fires that destroyed several older buildings.

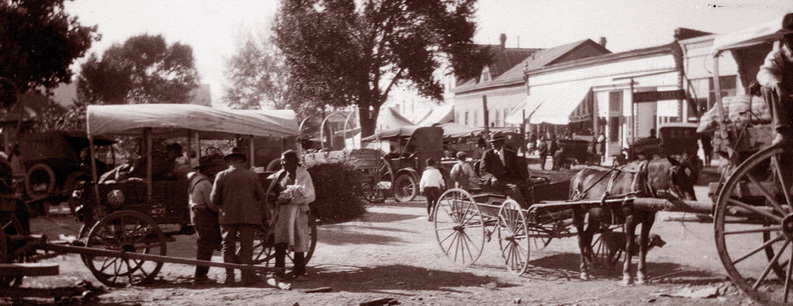
Taos Plaza looking northwest 1906

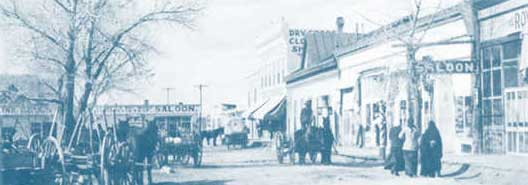
Taos Plaza, about 1907

Nearby is the home of Charles Bent, who was appointed Governor of New Mexico when it became an American Territory during the Mexican–American War. He was killed by Indian rebels during the Taos Revolt.

== American flag ==
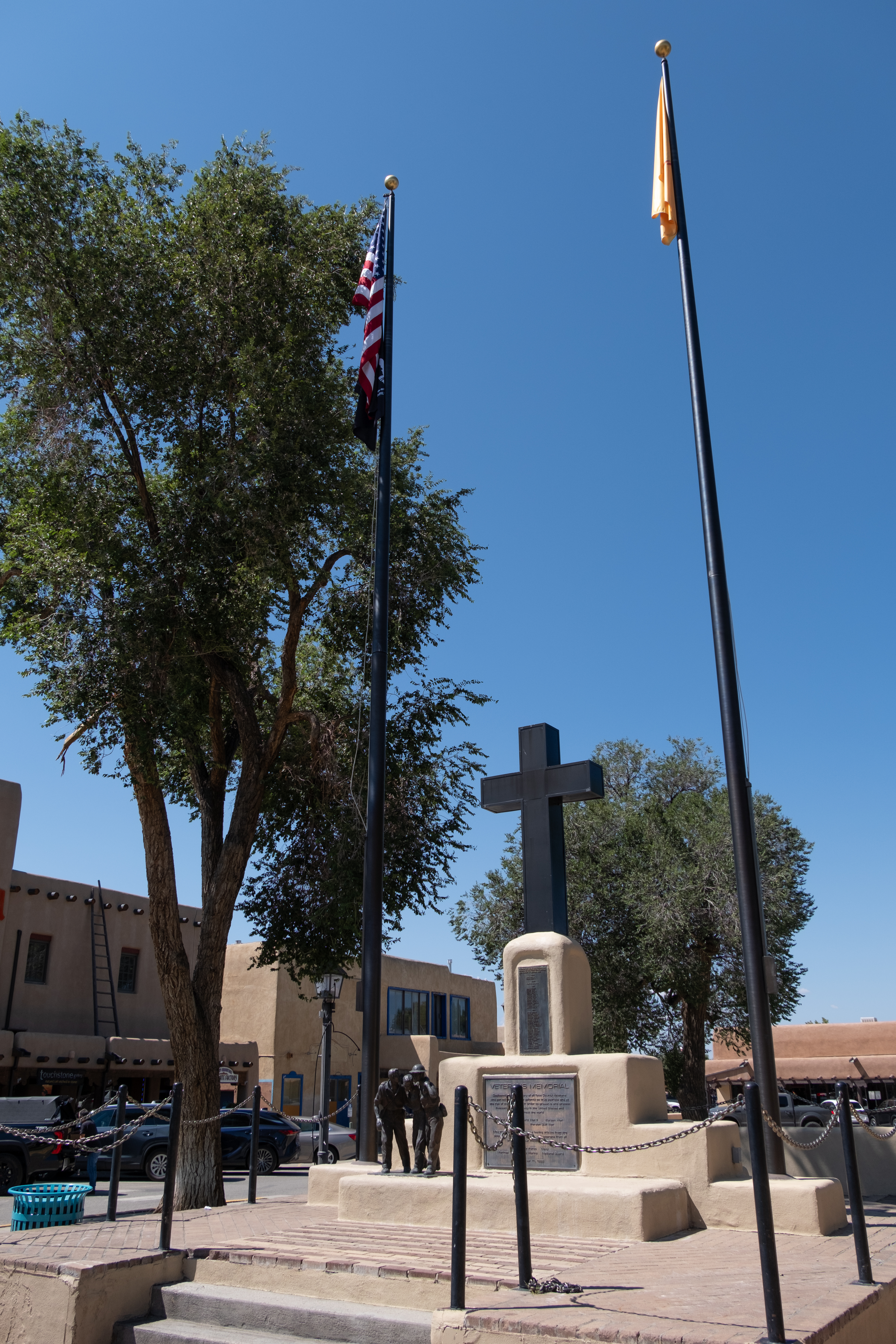
The flagpole at Taos Plaza

In 1861, during the Civil War, Southern sympathizers repeatedly tore down an American flag flying over the Plaza. Captain Smith Simpson, with the help of Kit Carson, Ceran St. Vrain, and others, guarded the flag 24 hours a day. The United States Congress permitted Taos to fly the flag twenty-four hours a day to commemorate the event.

== Tourism ==
Taos Plaza is a tourist destination with many shops displaying Northern New Mexico foods and cultural items, including products made in Taos, chile ristras, packaged food items, Southwestern jewelry, pottery, clothing, leather work, and Native American moccasins and drums.

The Fiestas de Santa Ana y Santiago (colloquially referred to as the Fiestas de Taos) is hosted during the final week of July, a weekend long celebration of the Hispanic heritage of Taos when the plaza is filled with music, food, and dance. It begins with a Friday night Mass and includes crowning of a fiesta queen. Other events, many of which are free, are held throughout the year in the plaza, including free music in the summer and Yuletide celebrations in December.

== Gallery ==
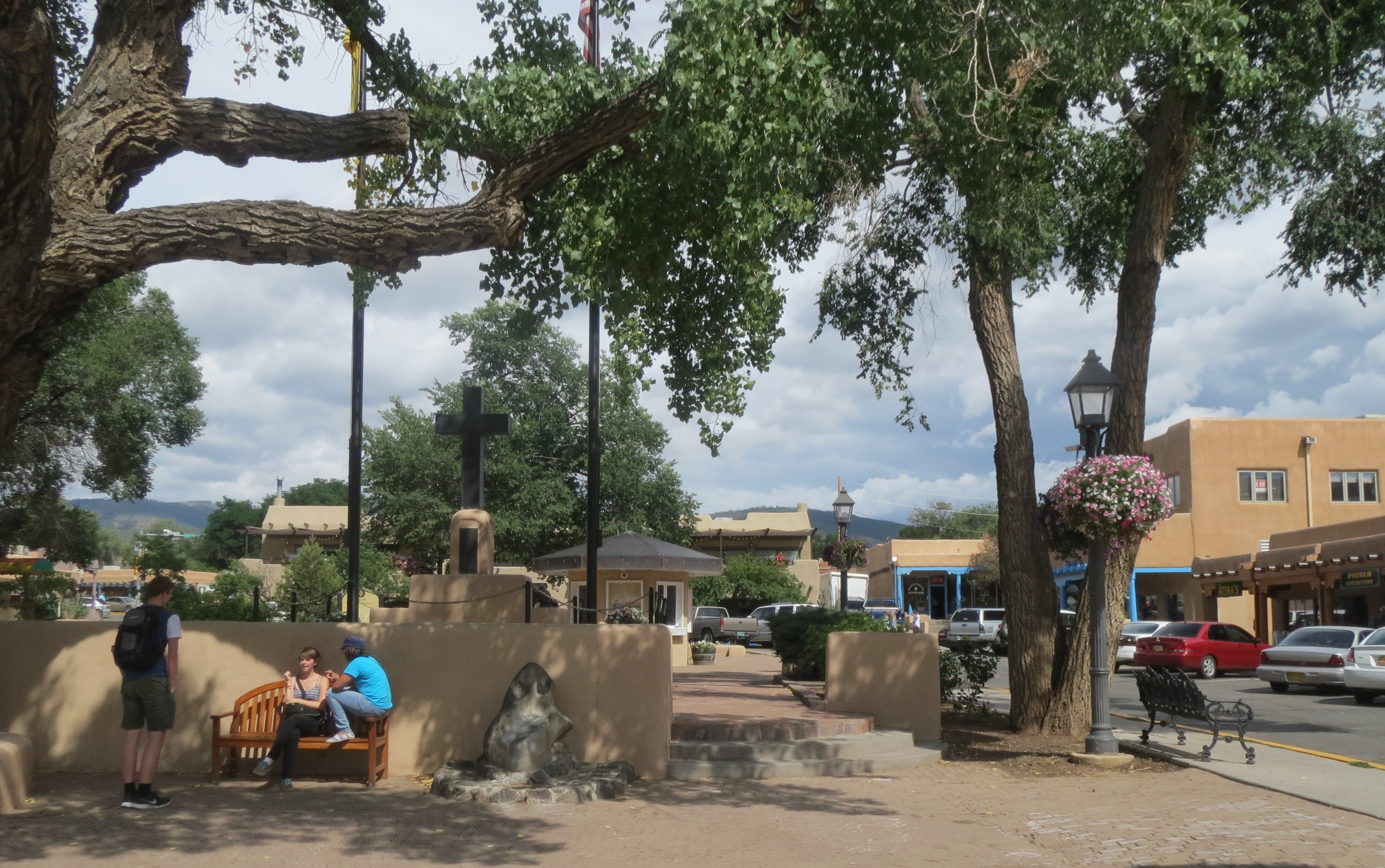
Taos Plaza, with shops, galleries and restaurants

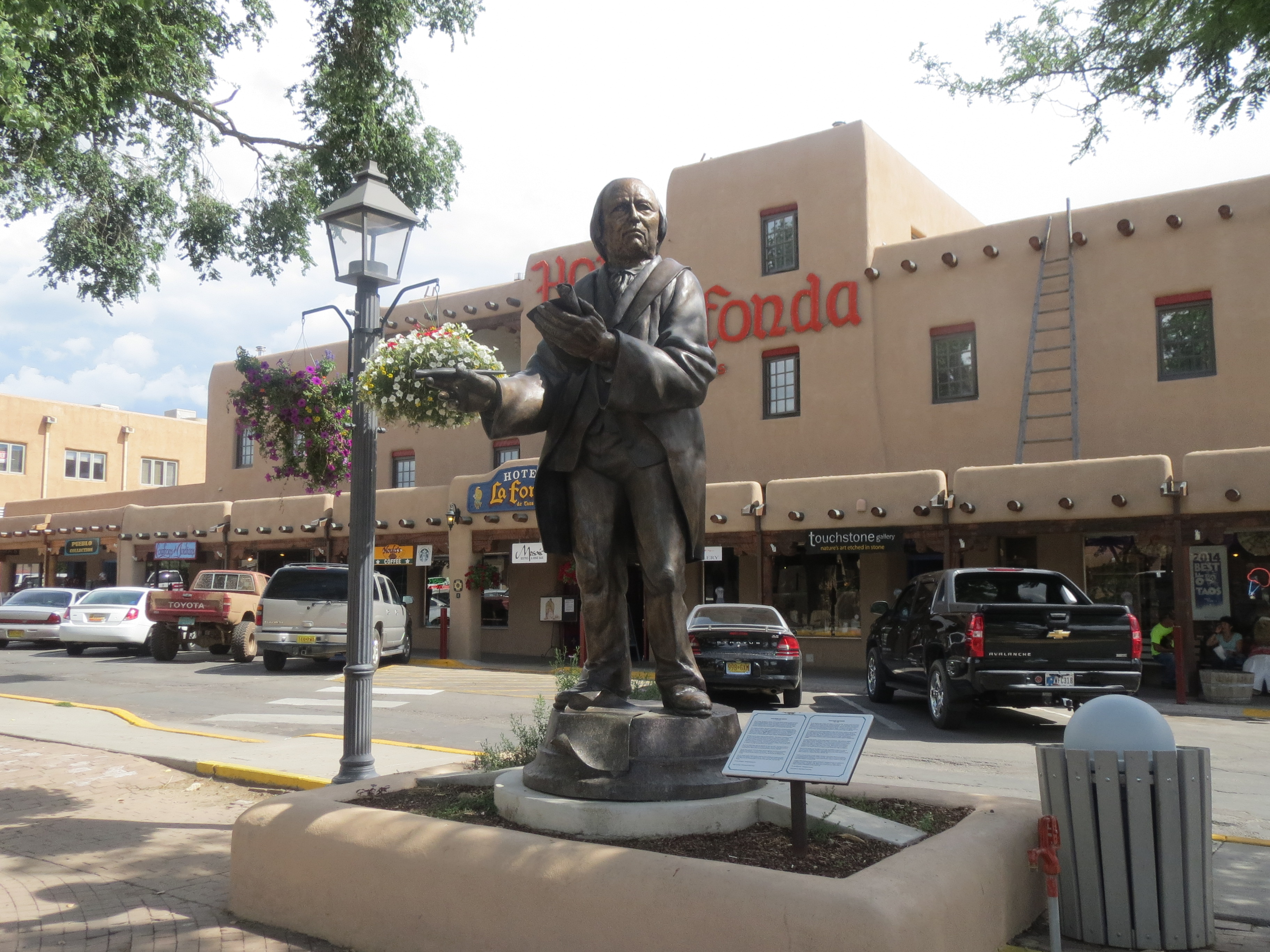
Taos Plaza and La Fonda Hotel, with sculpture of Padre Jose Antonio Martinez in the foreground

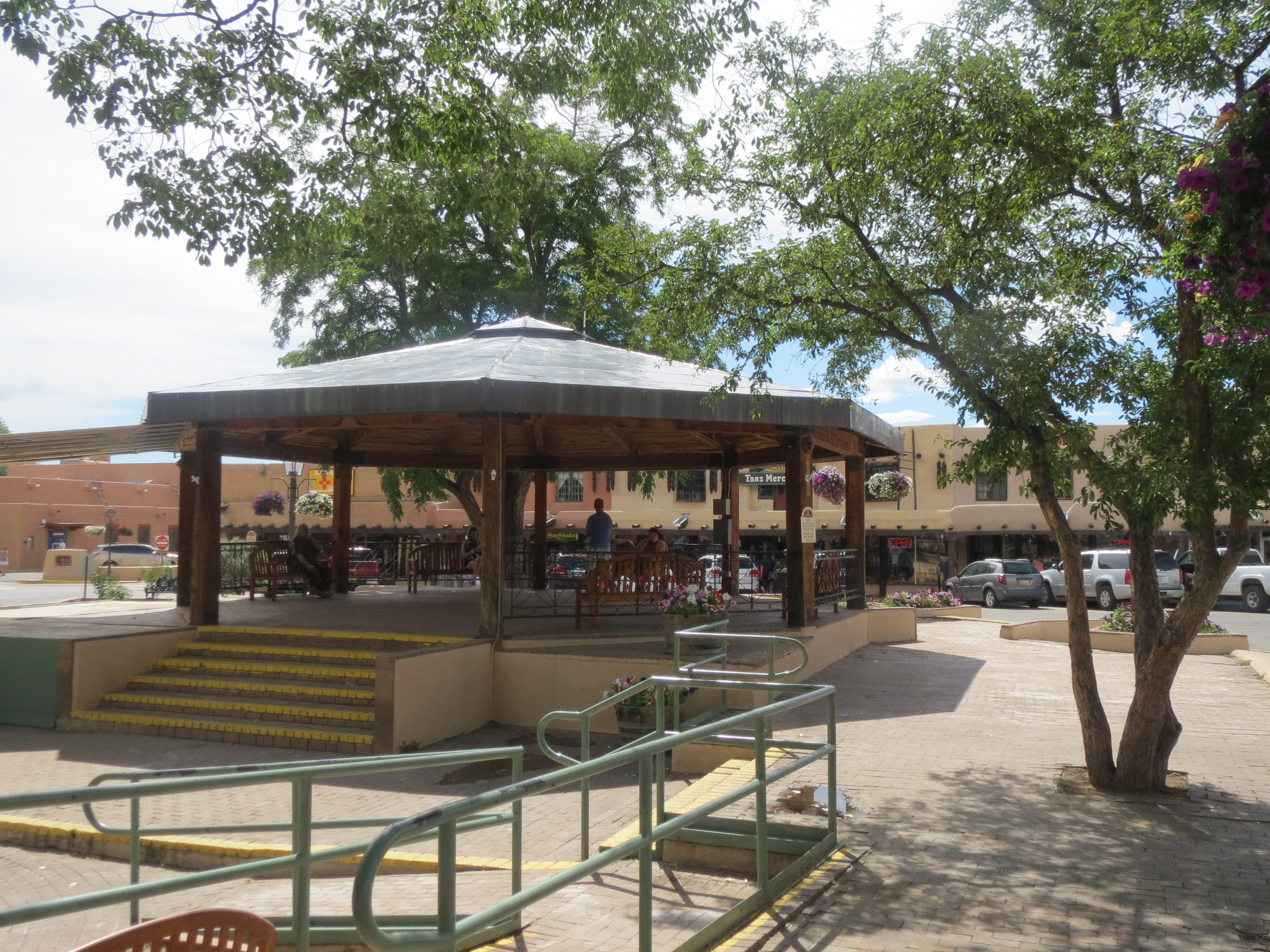
Taos Plaza, the gazebo was donated by Mabel Dodge Luhan

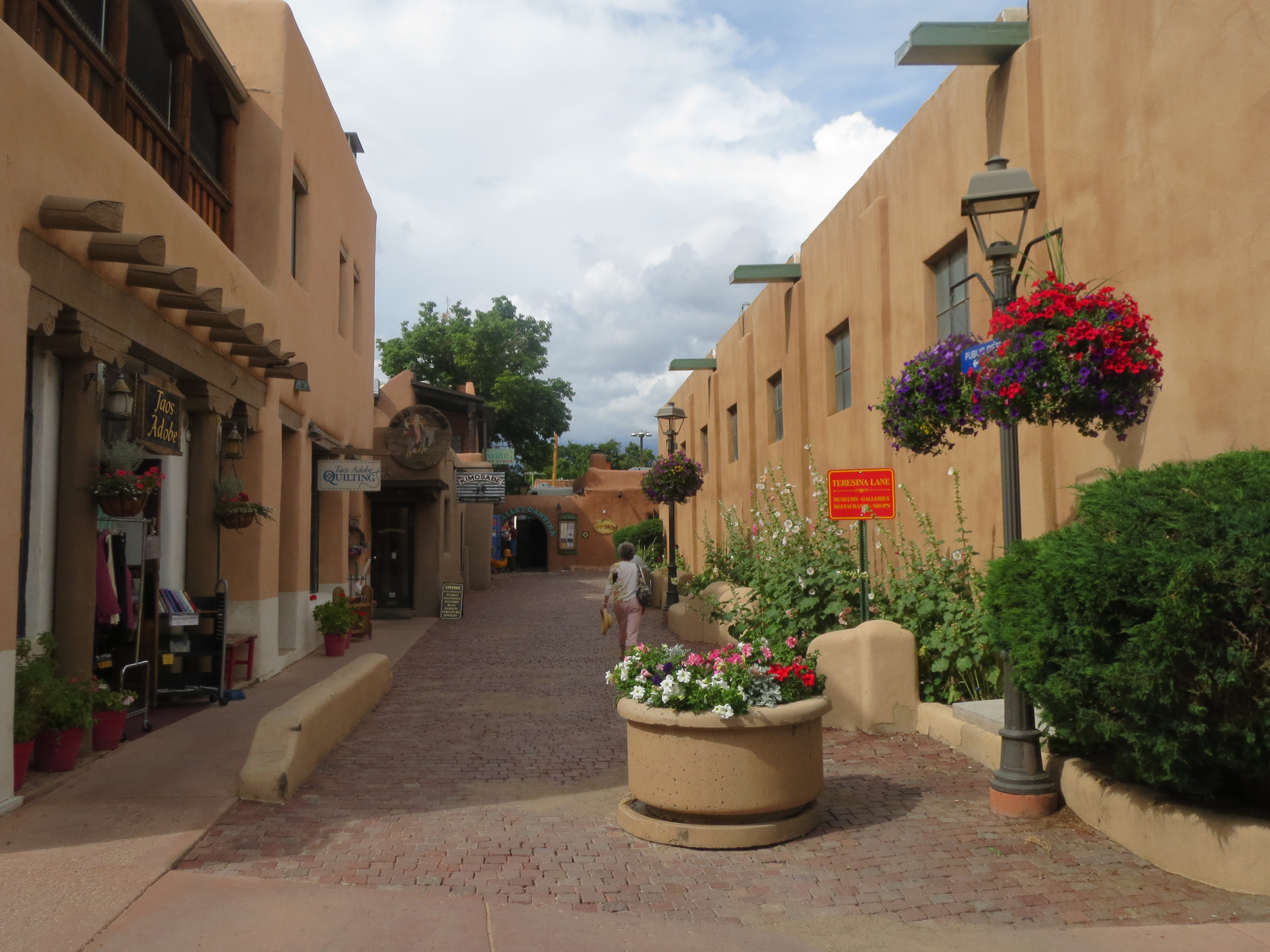
Alley off of the north side of the Taos Plaza with additional shops
