= Ernest L. Blumenschein House =

Historic house in New Mexico, United States

- U.S. National Register of Historic Places
- U.S. National Historic Landmark
- U.S. Historic district – Contributing property
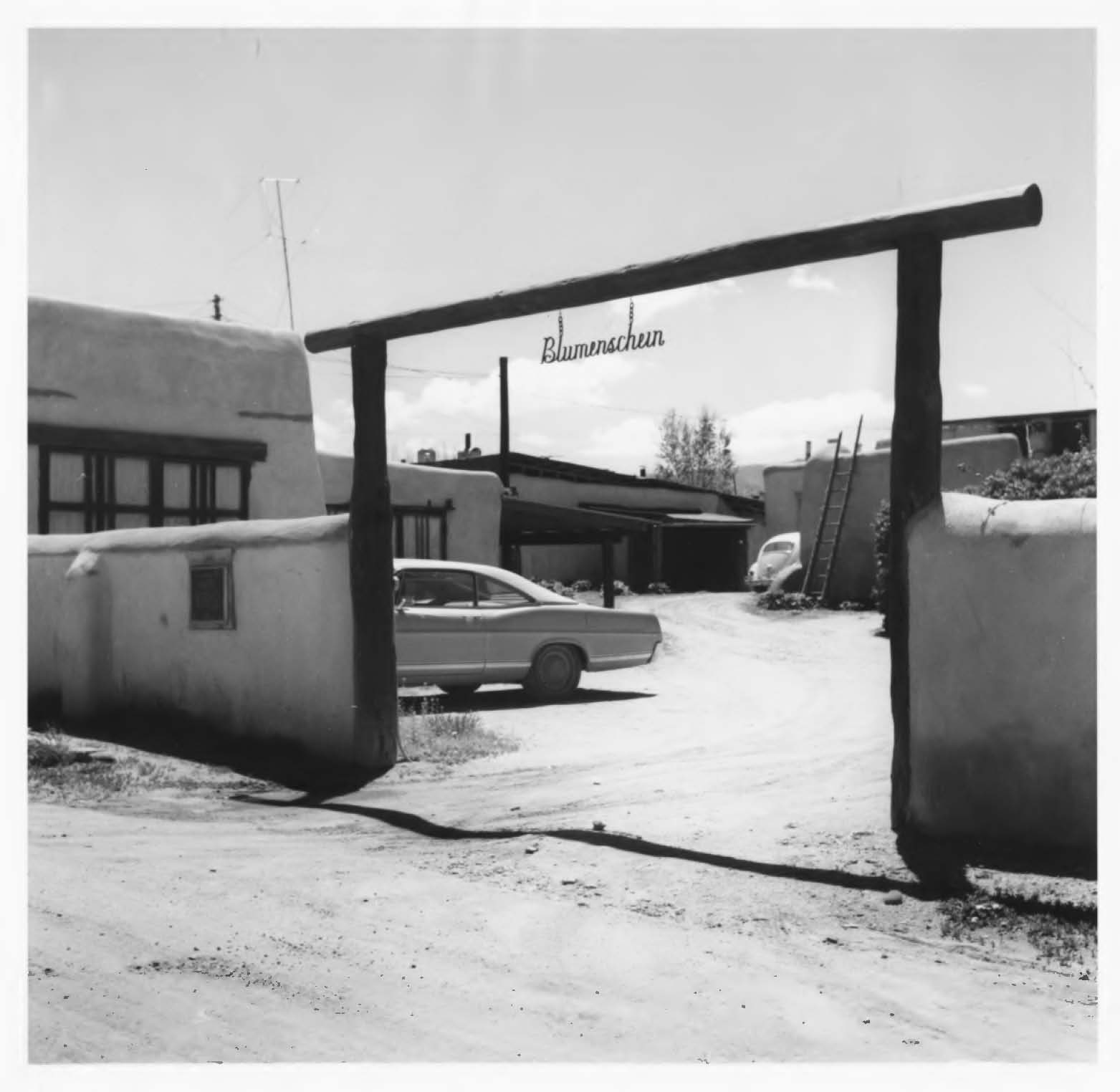
- Ernest L. Blumenschein House in 1969

- Location within New Mexico Location within the United States
- Location: 222 Ledoux St., Taos, New Mexico
- Coordinates: 36°24′21″N 105°34′34″W
- Area: less than one acre
- Built: 1823
- Architectural style: Colonial, Spanish Colonial
- Part of: Taos Downtown Historic District (ID82003340)
- NRHP reference No.: 66000495

Significant dates
- Added to NRHP: October 15, 1966
- Designated NHL: December 21, 1965
- Designated CP: July 8, 1982

The Ernest L. Blumenschein House is a historic house museum and art gallery at 222 Ledoux Street in Taos, New Mexico. It was a home of painter Ernest L. Blumenschein (1874-1960), a co-founder of the Taos Society of Artists and one of the Taos Six. It was declared a National Historic Landmark in 1965.

== Description and history ==
The Blumenschein House is located on the south side of Ledoux Street, 1-1/2 blocks south of central plaza in Taos. It is a single-story adobe structure, with eleven rooms, built in the Spanish Pueblo style with a central courtyard. A low wall with central opening separate the courtyard from the street. The house's construction date is uncertain, but its oldest sections probably predate the 1820s. The interior is furnished to appear as it might have been when the Blumenschein family lived there. It features family possessions, a collection of the family's art, works by other famous Taos artists, and fine European and Spanish Colonial style antiques. The museum is owned and operated by Taos Historic Museums.

Ernest Blumenschein, a native of Pittsburgh, Pennsylvania, was schooled in art in Cincinnati, New York City, and Paris. While in Paris he met Joseph Henry Sharp, who described a visit he made to Taos in 1883. Blumenschein and Bert Phillips traveled to Taos in 1898, where they established the Taos Art Colony. He used this house as a home and studio from 1919 until 1960. The house itself had previously been used as a home and studio by Herbert Dunton, and was already well known as a gathering point for artists. The colony formed by these people was broadly influential in exposing the art world to Taos and the desert southwest. The house remained in the Blumenschein family until 1962, when his heirs donated it to the organization that is now Taos Historic Museums. After a period as a multiunit residence, it was converted into a museum and gallery space.

== Gallery ==
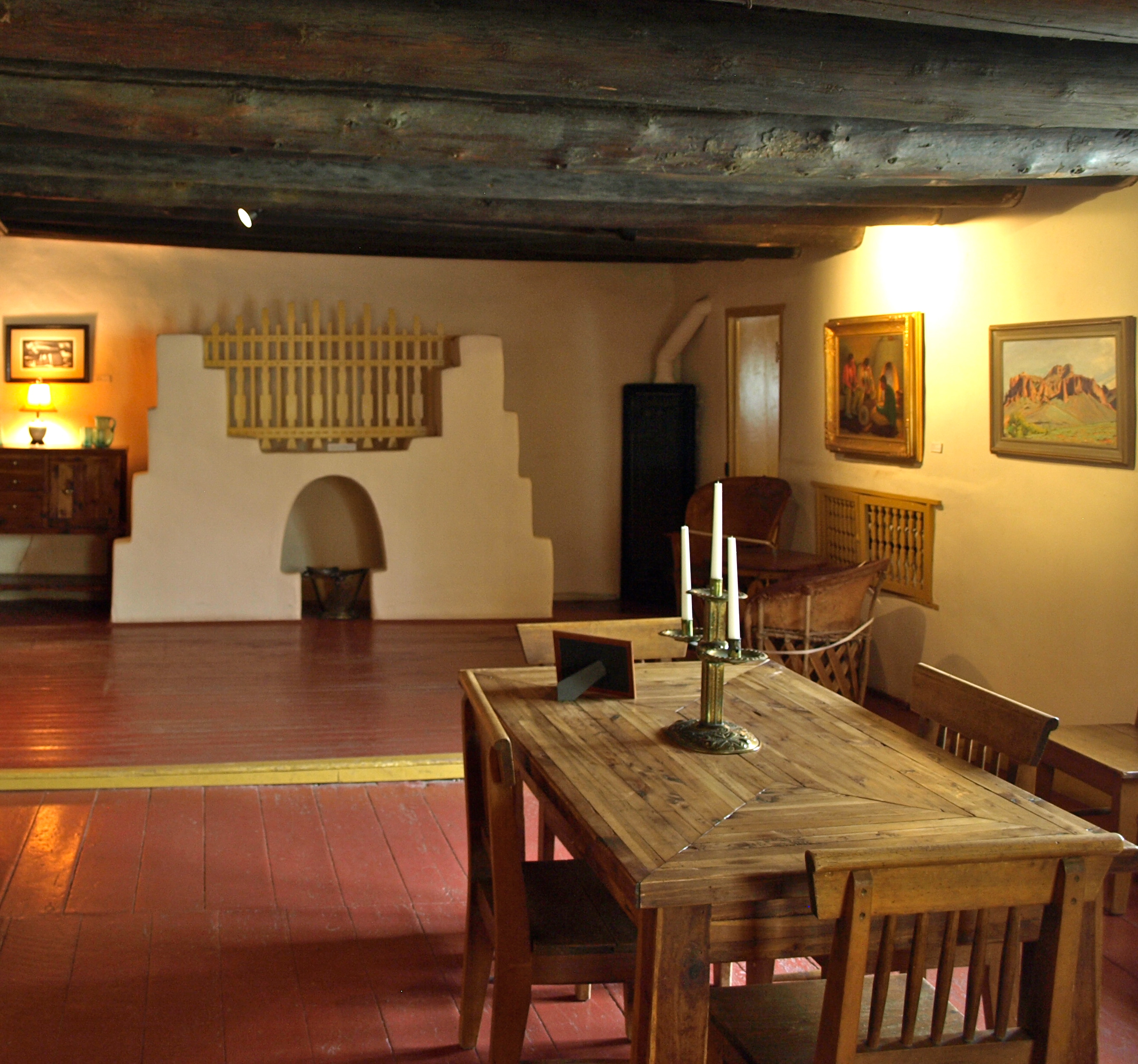
Dining room in Blumenschein Home. This section of the house was built in 1797.

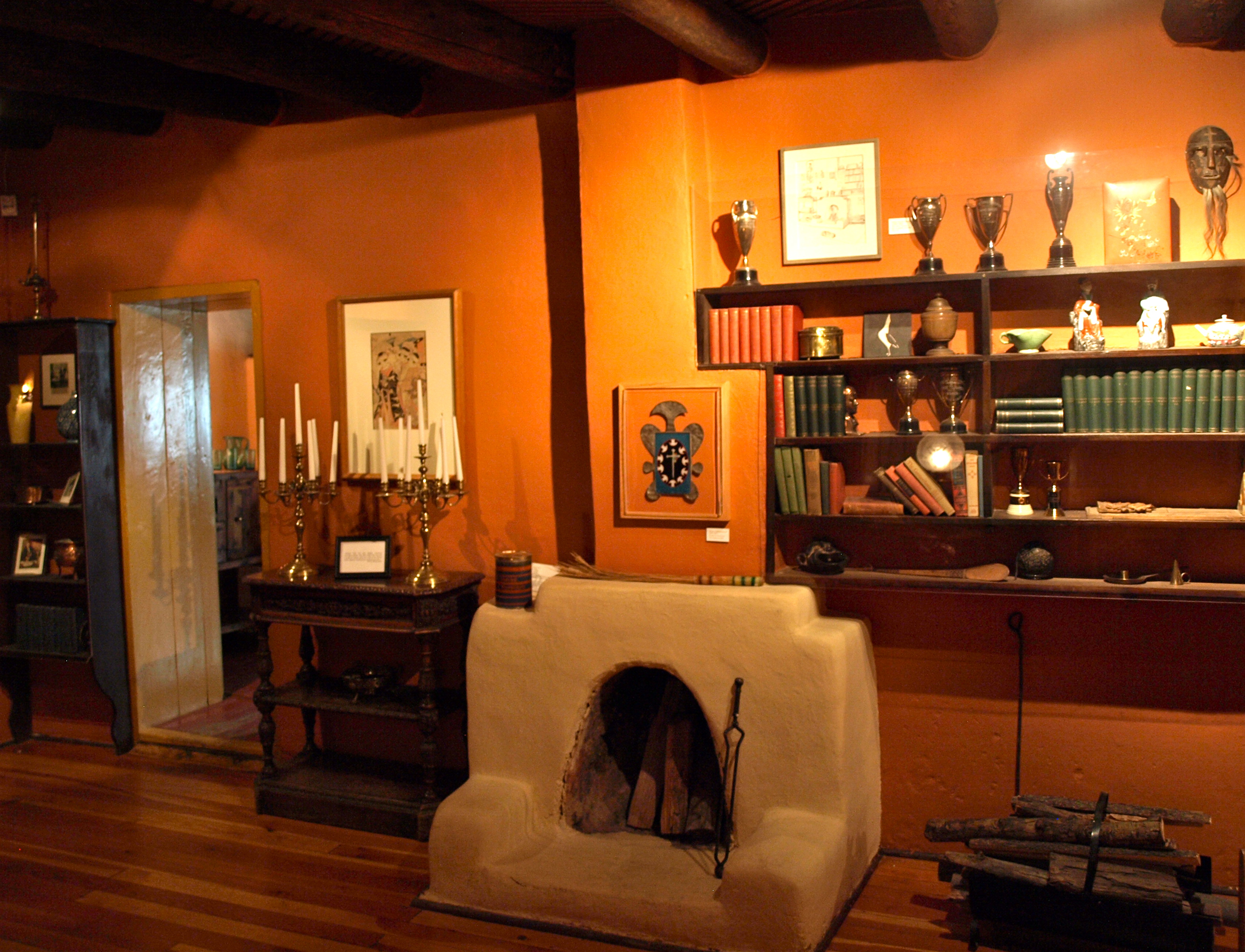
Library in Blumenschein Home, 2010

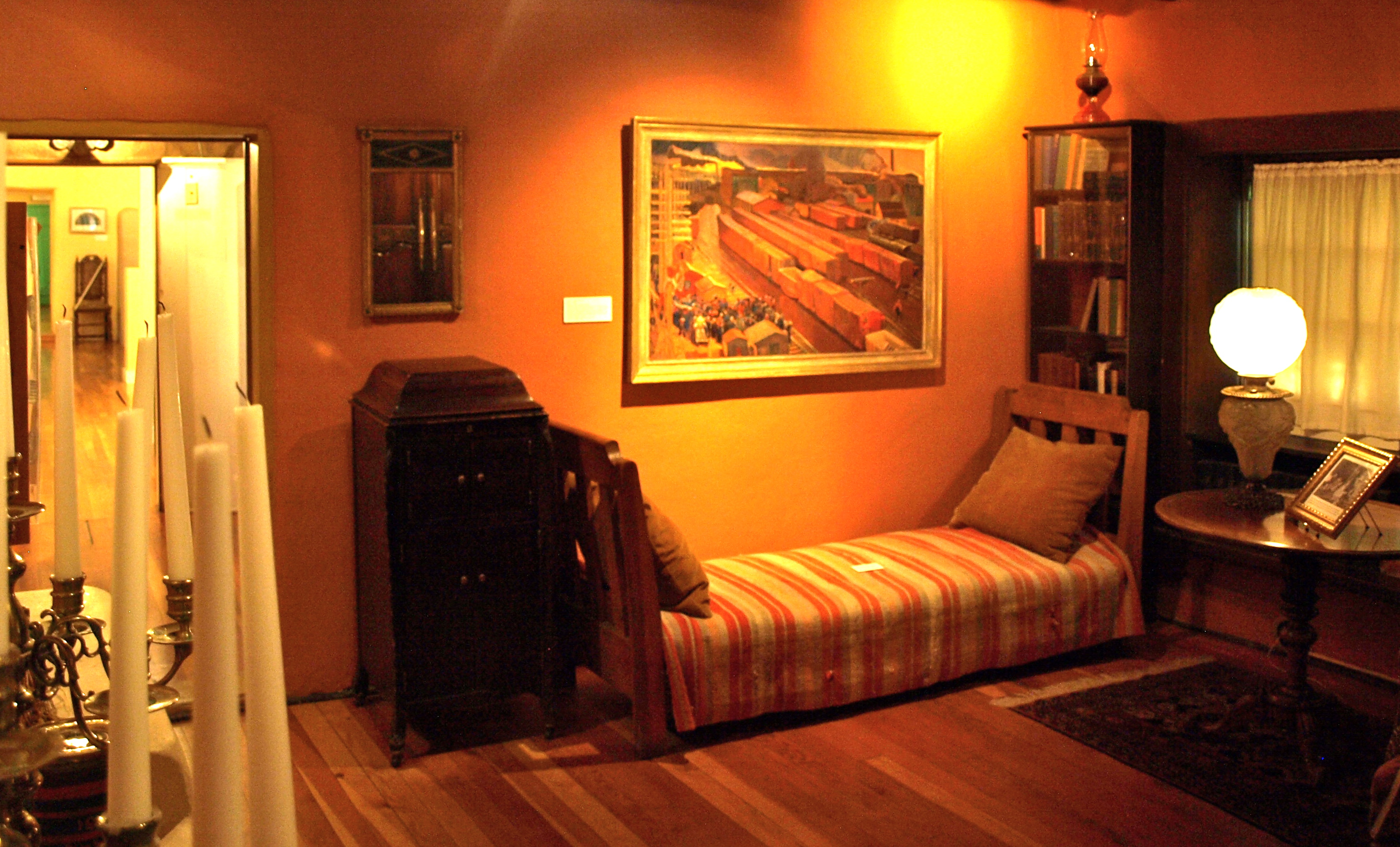
Library, Blumenschein painting above daybed is Railroad Yard, Meeting Called (reworked 1951)

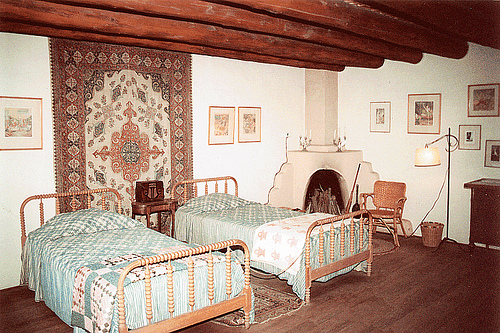
Bedroom in Blumenschein Home, 1989

== See also ==
- National Register of Historic Places listings in Taos County, New Mexico
- List of National Historic Landmarks in New Mexico
