= Taos Valley =

Valley in New Mexico, United States

Coordinates: 36°22′30.09″N 105°40′17.05″W

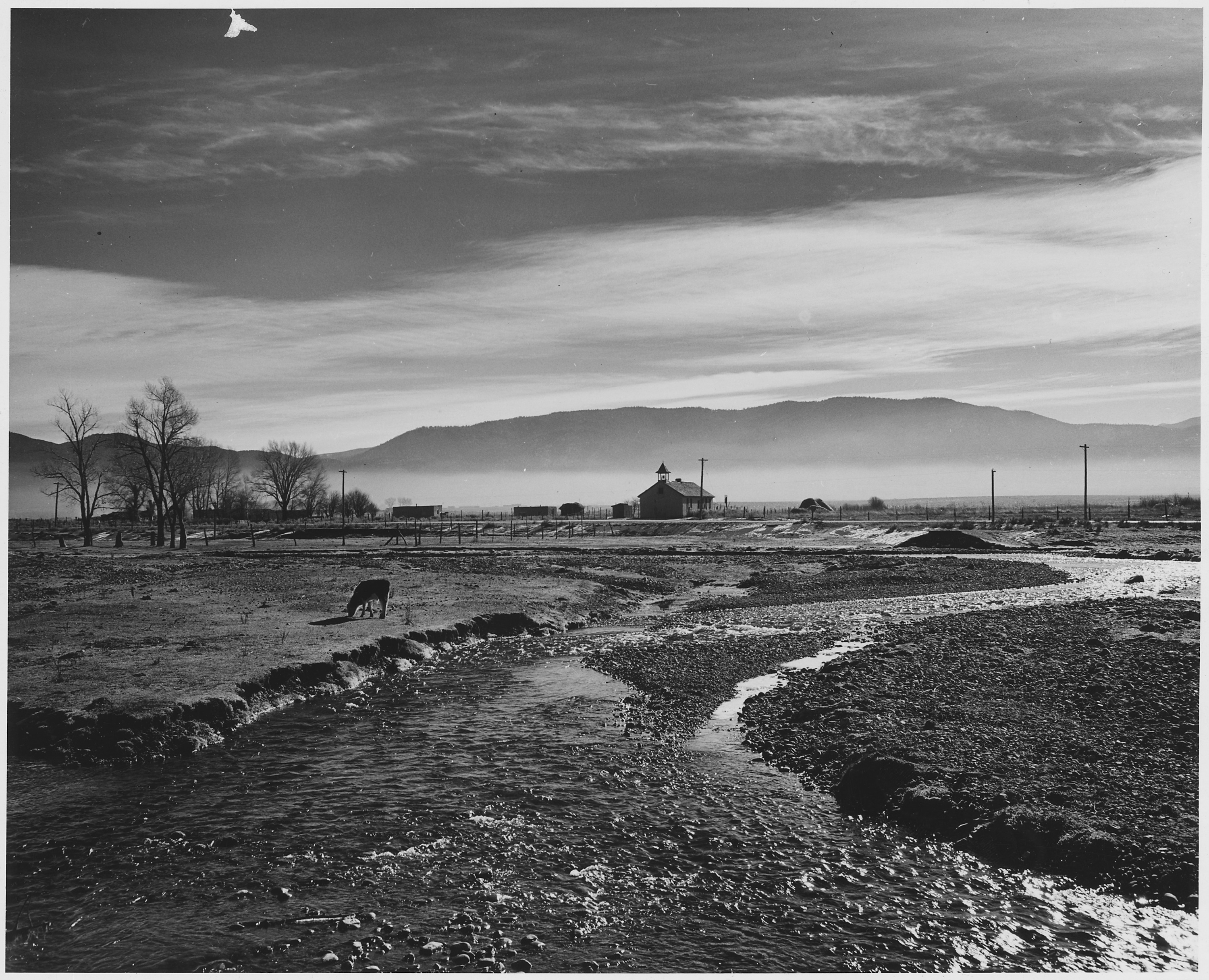
Taos Valley mist in the morning, The Rio Pueblo de Taos, New Mexico

Taos Valley, also called Lower Taos Canyon, is a valley located in Taos County, New Mexico. It is bounded by the Rio Grande Gorge; the deep ravine, or Arroyo Hondo, of the Rio Hondo; and the Taos Mountain range. Included in the valley are Ranchos de Taos, the Taos Pueblo, and Taos Plaza.

== Overlook ==
The Taos Valley Overlook of the Río Grande del Norte National Monument, about 11 miles (18 km), provides a view of the Taos Valley and the Rio Grande Gorge. Four rivers cross the Taos Valley: Rio de Taos, Rio Lucero, Rio de las Trampas, and Rio de San Fernando.

== History ==
The valley was used for more than 9,000 years as a major route for travel and trade according to archaeological evidence. Pit houses and room blocks provided the first permanent housing for inhabitants beginning about 900 A.D. Ancestral Puebloans are believed to have moved into the area of the Taos Valley and tributaries of the Rio Grande at that time.

It was the home of the puebloan people of Taos Pueblo beginning about 1100 or 1200 A.D. At that time, construction began on multiple dwellings. It was first visited by people of European descent in the 1500s, when Capitan Hernando Alvarado arrived on August 29, 1540. He was part of Francisco Vázquez de Coronado's expedition. Alvarado met the Tiwa people of Taos Pueblo. Fray Francisco de Zamora spread the Catholic religion throughout the Taos Valley, will based at the Taos Pueblo from 1610 to 1617. The Spanish were driven out of the area by the Puebloans in 1680. Sixteen years later, Diego de Vargas resettled the area around Ranchos de Taos, the Taos Pueblo, and Taos Plaza. Taos Valley had a population of 306 people of Spanish descent in 67 families in 1776. The most populated area in the valley at that time was Ranchos de Taos. The Spanish brought modern methods for irrigation called acequias and introduced fruit and vegetables to the region. They also introduced livestock. The Puebloans taught the Spanish how to build adobe structures.
