= Governor Charles Bent House =

Historic house in New Mexico, United States

- U.S. National Register of Historic Places
- NM State Register of Cultural Properties
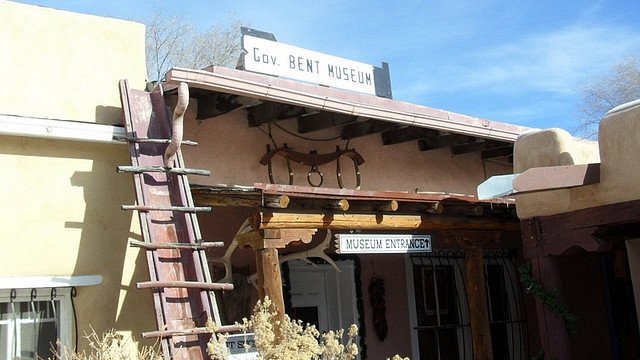
- Governor Charles Bent House

- Location within New Mexico
- Location: 117 Bent Street, Taos, New Mexico
- Coordinates: 36°24′31″N 105°34′22″W
- Area: 0.3 acres (0.12 ha)
- Built: 1830
- NRHP reference No.: 78001831
- NMSRCP No.: 50

Significant dates
- Added to NRHP: November 16, 1978
- Designated NMSRCP: March 21, 1969

The Governor Bent House is the historic home of Governor Charles Bent who served as the first United States territorial governor of New Mexico.

== Charles Bent ==
In 1846 Charles Bent was appointed Governor of the territory of New Mexico during the Mexican–American War. An Anglo-American government rule was culture shock to the Native Americans who had lived in the land for many centuries and then coexisted (in a manner where kidnapping, murder and rape by both sides was commonplace) with Hispanic people during Spanish colonization and then possession by Mexico. Protesting American's possession of the territory, an angry mob descended on his home in January, 1847 and killed Governor Bent, survived by his wife and children who escaped through a hole in the adobe wall to the neighboring home.

Prior to becoming governor, Bent was a well-respected trader who owned a number of wagon trains on the Santa Fe Trail and trading posts in Santa Fe and Taos. Bent built Bent's Fort in Colorado with his brother William and Ceran St. Vrain. It was a famous trading center for Native Americans and early mountain men. He traded with frontier mountain men, exchanging supplies for furs and buffalo hides.

== Museum ==
Located just north of the Taos Plaza at 117 Bent Street, the Governor Bent House is a private museum open to the public. Inside the museum are memorabilia and artifacts of the uprising. Within the house is the hole in the wall that allowed family members to escape. The museum also has works of local artists.

The building is Hispanic Vernacular built about 1835 of adobe stucco over adobe bricks and wooden framed building. The building is on the State Register of Cultural Properties since 1969 and the National Register of Historic Places. The building is occupied by the museum, an art gallery and rental units.

== See also ==
- National Register of Historic Places listings in Taos County, New Mexico
