= Huberto Maestas =

American sculptor

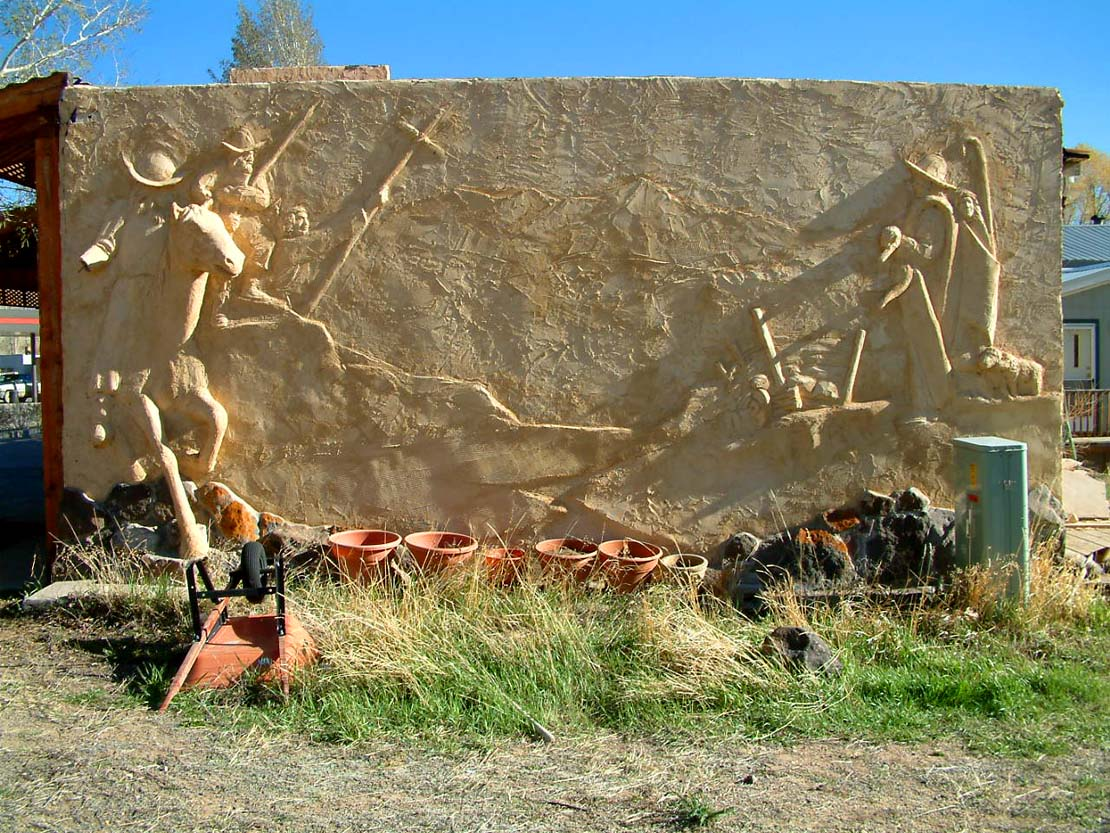
Spanish arrival in the San Luis Valley

Huberto Maestas is an American sculptor living in San Luis, Colorado. His notable works include the life-sized Stations of the Cross located in San Luis, Colorado, miniatures of which are in the Vatican collection, and the statue of Padre Martinez in Taos, New Mexico.

Maestas's former studio can be found in downtown San Luis, recognizable by the life-sized bas relief on the side of the building depicting Spanish conquistadors and farmers arriving in the San Luis Valley.
