= Antonio José Martínez =

New Mexican priest (1793–1867)

The Reverend Antonio José Martínez
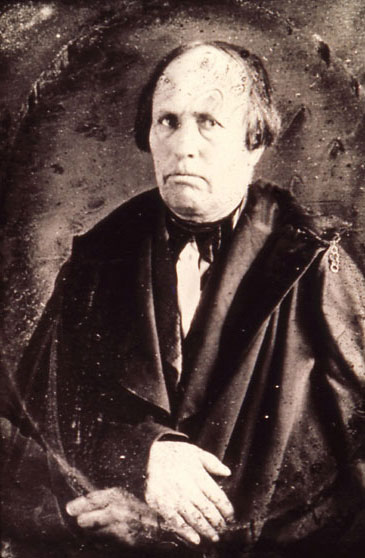
- Padre Martínez, c. 1848
- Born: January 17, 1793; Abiquiú, Santa Fe de Nuevo México, Viceroyalty of New Spain (now Rio Arriba County, New Mexico, U.S.)
- Died: July 27, 1867 (aged 74); Kit Carson Park in Taos, New Mexico
- Occupations: Priest, educator, publisher, rancher, farmer, community leader, and politician

Antonio José Martínez (January 17, 1793 – July 27, 1867) was a New Mexican Catholic priest, educator, publisher, community leader attorney and politician. He served five times under the Republic of Mexico on the legislature of the Departamento de Nuevo Mexico, and six times for the Territory of New Mexico under the United States.

== Biography ==
=== Spanish period ===
Martínez was born Antonio Jose Martinez in Abiquiu on January 17, 1793, when New Mexico was a very isolated and desolate territory of the Spanish Empire. In 1804, the Martinez family, including his father Severino and five siblings, moved to Taos, a prosperous outpost, where they came to be known as Martínez. His mother was María del Carmel Santistévan of La Plaza de Santa Rosa de Abiquiú. During his upbringing, Martínez's father taught him the importance of ranching and farming at the Hacienda Martínez in Northern New Mexico. In 1811, Martínez married María de la Luz, who died giving birth to their daughter less than a year later, when he was 19. Their child was named in honor of María de la Luz.

Six years later, Martínez moved south after much thought and correspondence with the Catholic Bishop of Durango. He decided to travel there in 1817, and become a priest, enrolling in the Tridentine Seminary of the Diocese of Durango. Martínez not only excelled at the seminary but also in understanding the ideals of liberal Mexican politicians and teachers of his day, including Miguel Hidalgo. After six years, Martínez was ordained and returned to New Mexico, where after a few years in other parishes, he became the parish priest of Taos.

In 1826, Martinez established a coed elementary school and in 1833 a seminary from which 16 men were ordained to the priesthood.

=== American period ===
In 1841, the newly formed Republic of Texas recognized the difficulties New Mexico was facing and decided to take advantage of them by sending an expedition to invade New Mexico and possibly annex the territory. The invasion failed, and the Texans were captured by Manuel Armijo. This event, in addition to the numerous Americans already living in New Mexico, led many to believe that New Mexico had weakened and become ready for invasion. The Mexican–American War began in 1846. Stephen W. Kearny led 1,700 American troops into Santa Fe without encountering any resistance. Before the invasion, Martínez had witnessed the animosity towards Native Americans and Mexicans displayed by the Anglos living in New Mexico. He encouraged his students to study law and it was to them he delivered his famous quote, "The American government resembles a burro; but on this burro lawyers will ride, not priests."

Within a year of the American occupation, the Taos Revolt occurred. Charles Bent, the newly appointed American governor of New Mexico, was assassinated in the uprising. American forces quickly regained power, instituted martial law, and executed the rebels involved. Many, including Kit Carson, believed Martínez himself took part in some way in instigating the rebellion, but nothing has been proven. In a letter to a friend in Santa Fe, Martínez stated that the American reprisals were too harsh and would hinder future relations between New Mexico and its new rulers. Despite the problems, Martínez was able to adjust to the administration and for seven years played a dominant role in the conventions and legislative sessions of the new New Mexico Territory.

Also during the American period, Martinez founded in 1846 a law school that graduated many of the earliest lawyers and politicians of the Territory of New Mexico. He produced a spelling workbook for the children of his family members, and later obtained the first printing press in New Mexico. In 1838, he published his autobiography on his press, and the following year published the first book printed in New Mexico, a bilingual ritual—Latin and Spanish. He published only six issues of the newspaper called El Crepúsculo de Libertad; published religious/devotional tracts and texts for his elementary school, seminary, and law school.

==== Conflict with Bishop Lamy ====
With the new government came new leadership, both political and religious. Jean-Baptiste Lamy, a Frenchman nearly 21 years younger than Martínez, became the vicar apostolic of Santa Fe in 1851. Martínez supported Lamy until January 1854, when Lamy issued a letter instituting mandatory tithing and decreeing that heads of families that failed to tithe be denied the sacraments. Martínez publicly protested the letter and openly contested it in the secular press. From then on, Lamy and Martínez clashed over many issues, such as the effects of frontier life on Catholic standards, and women's issues. The two also argued over interpretations of canon law. The situation culminated when Lamy wrote a letter explaining that he felt New Mexicans faced a sad future because they didn't have the intellectual liveliness of Americans and their morals were primitive. These comments outraged New Mexicans. The clergy of New Mexico wrote a letter directly to the Pope, expressing their concern about Lamy. Martínez was not involved in the letter but continued to write communiques criticizing Lamy for the Santa Fe Gazette.

In early 1856, Martínez offered his conditional resignation, but admitted his parishioners in Taos, New Mexico, to his private chapel in his home and ministered to them from there. On October 27, 1856, Lamy suspended Martínez. In response, Martínez antagonized the pastor that Lamy sent in his place, persuaded a neighboring priest of his goals and gained the allegiance of approximately a third of the parishioners in the two parishes. Finally, in April 1858, Lamy excommunicated Martínez. Martínez never recognized the validity of the excommunication and continued to minister to his supporters until his death. Martínez also continued to write about Christianity, publishing his famous work, Religión, in which he called for small honoraria for priests in New Mexico, because of the heavy demands associated with New Mexico's isolation. He also explained the problem of denying sacraments to individuals because of their financial status. Lastly, he condemned the Spanish Inquisition and all the actions associated with it, including the many excommunications.

=== Death ===
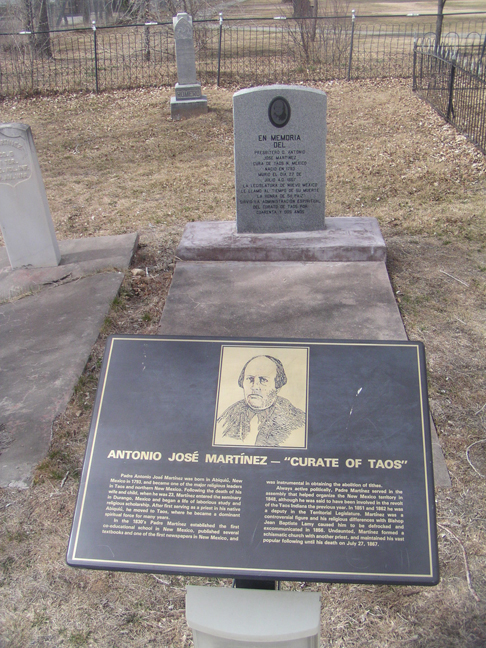
The grave of Fr. Martínez

Martínez died on July 27, 1867. Infirm and aged beyond his years, Martínez lived the last ten years of his life estranged from Lamy.

In his will, Martínez expressed a desire not to have a public ceremony, nevertheless there was a large funeral ceremony for him. Martínez requested to be buried in his Oratorio, dedicated to La Purísima Concepción, contiguous to and on the west-side of his residence. This request was honored, and so he was buried in his own Oratorio that he had built on his property. A quarter century later in 1891, his body was moved about two miles east the American Cemetery. The land, originally owned by Martínez, was deeded to Theodora Romero, and then came into possession of the Kit Carson park and cemetery in Taos.

Inscribed on the Martínez tombstone are the words La Honra de su País ("The Honor of his Homeland"). Martínez's peers in the Territorial Legislature pronounced this encomium in 1867, the year of his death.

== Personal life ==
Martínez was married before he became a priest; his wife died in childbirth, and his daughter died at the young age of 12. Even after ordination, Martínez had other children that he recognized as heirs in his will. His eldest was Santiago Valdez (b. 1830) who wrote his 1877 biography, and the second to the youngest was Vicente Ferrer Romero (b. 1844) who became an effective evangelist in the Presbyterian Church.

After his tension and controversies with Lamy, in 1863 it seems Martínez flirted with becoming an Anglican, observing Holy Communion "according to the reformed rite" with Bishop Joseph C. Talbot. However, he remained staunchly Catholic. as his last will and testament testifies.

== Legacy ==
Martínez appears as a character in Willa Cather's 1927 novel Death Comes for the Archbishop.

Sculptor Huberto Maestas of San Luis, Colorado sculpted the larger than life-sized bronze memorial of Martínez unveiled at Taos Plaza on July 16, 2006.

== Controversy ==
=== Revolution of 1837 ===
When Santa Anna became the President of Mexico in 1833, he intentionally began to centralize and departmentalize the Mexican government. Santa Anna also began to impose harsher taxes in New Mexico, which sparked a rebellion in the northern part of the province. In 1837, the rebels, mostly poorer ranchers and farmers, captured Santa Fe, killed governor Albino Pérez, and installed their own governor, José María González. The leaders of the rebellion were divided on their goals and soon factionalized.

American merchants and traders within New Mexico were uncomfortable about the new government and funded a Mexican army led by Manuel Armijo to put down the uprising. The Martínez family had grown wealthy through trade and would have become a critical subject had the rebellion survived. Martínez not only helped fund the Mexican army, but also offered his services to Armijo as chaplain of the army until the termination of the revolt in early 1838, when the old administration was restored with Armijo as governor. Upon suppression of the rebellion, Armijo ordered the execution of José Gonzales, but not before directing Martínez: "Padre Martĺnez, confiese á este genĺzaro para que le dén cinco balazos" ("Father Martĺnez, hear this genizaro's confession so that he may be shot five times"). Martínez heard Gonzales's confession and then handed him over to Armijo.

=== Penitentes ===
Following Mexican independence from Spain, Church authorities in Mexico withdrew the Franciscan, Dominican and Jesuit missionaries from its provinces. In 1832, the last of the Franciscan regional authorities authorized Padre Martínez to supervise the Penitente brotherhood, a type of folk Catholicism that had developed among the Hispano New Mexicans. In addition to offering spiritual and social aid to the community, the Penitentes engaged in such ascetic practices as flagellation and the carrying of heavy crosses. Bishop Lamy unsuccessfully attempted to suppress the brotherhood as a part of the "Americanization" of the Church in New Mexico. Padre Martínez championed the Penitente cause, putting him squarely at odds with Lamy.

== See also ==
- Death Comes for the Archbishop
- Lamy of Santa Fe
