= Doktor Martin =

Doktor Martin may refer to:

- Doktor Martin (German TV series)
- Doktor Martin (Czech TV series)

== See also ==
- Doc Martin (disambiguation)
