= Mabel Dodge Luhan House =

Historic house in New Mexico, United States

- U.S. National Register of Historic Places
- U.S. National Historic Landmark
- NM State Register of Cultural Properties
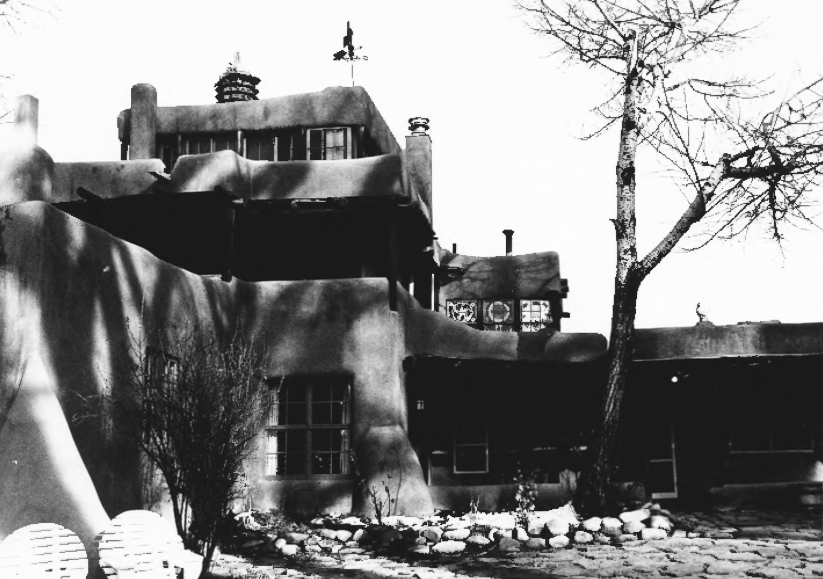
- View from entry courtyard

- Location within New Mexico Location within the United States
- Location: Luhan Lane, Taos, New Mexico
- Coordinates: 36°24′29″N 105°33′52″W
- Area: 5.3 acres (2.1 ha)
- Built: 1800
- Architect: Tony Luhan; Mabel Dodge Luhan
- Architectural style: Pueblo
- NRHP reference No.: 78001832
- NMSRCP No.: 540

Significant dates
- Added to NRHP: November 15, 1978
- Designated NHL: December 4, 1991
- Designated NMSRCP: December 9, 1977

The Mabel Dodge Luhan House, also known as the Big House, is a historic house at 240 Morada Lane in Taos, New Mexico, United States. It was designated a National Historic Landmark in 1991. It is now used as a hotel and conference center.

It was a home of arts supporter and writer Mabel Dodge Luhan (1879–1962), where she orchestrated one of the most successful artistic salon environments in the early 20th century United States, hosting well-known writers, painters, photographers, and musicians, and nurturing the young Taos art colony.

== Description ==
The Mabel Dodge Luhan House is located near the eastern edge of the town center of Taos, at the end of Morada Lane. The house, originally part of a larger compound, is a 20+ room adobe construction up to three stories in height. Stylistically it is an early example of what is now recognized as the Pueblo Revival style, blending elements of traditional Native American Pueblo elements with those of the Spanish Colonial period.

== History ==
The house was built between 1917 and 1922, using largely traditional Puebloan construction methods, and incorporates into its structure two older buildings. The work was overseen by Tony Luhan, a Native American whom Mabel Dodge later married. The public spaces of the interior include the large "Big Room", a two-section chamber that doubles as entrance vestibule, and the "Rainbow Room", so named for the colors painted on the latillas (the crossing members of the ceiling above the vigas). The house was the largest of several small houses Luhan had built on her property; the others served as additional guest quarters, and have not been well preserved.

Mabel Dodge Luhan was born into a wealthy family and was well-educated in the arts. In the 1910s, she became well known for the salon-style gatherings at her New York City apartment. Her short marriage to painter Maurice Sterne brought her to New Mexico in 1917, where she soon bought the property near Taos, and sought to recreate the salon atmosphere in the budding art colony.

Her endeavour was highly influential, furthering the careers of writers Willa Cather and D. H. Lawrence and artists and photographers including Ansel Adams, Georgia O'Keeffe, and Edward Weston. Musical guests included composer and conductor Leopold Stokowski and composer Dane Rudhyar. While resident here, Luhan also wrote seven books on cultural and intellectual aspects of American society.

The house was later owned for a time by actor Dennis Hopper. It currently is used as a hotel and conference center, with a focus on education.

== Gallery ==
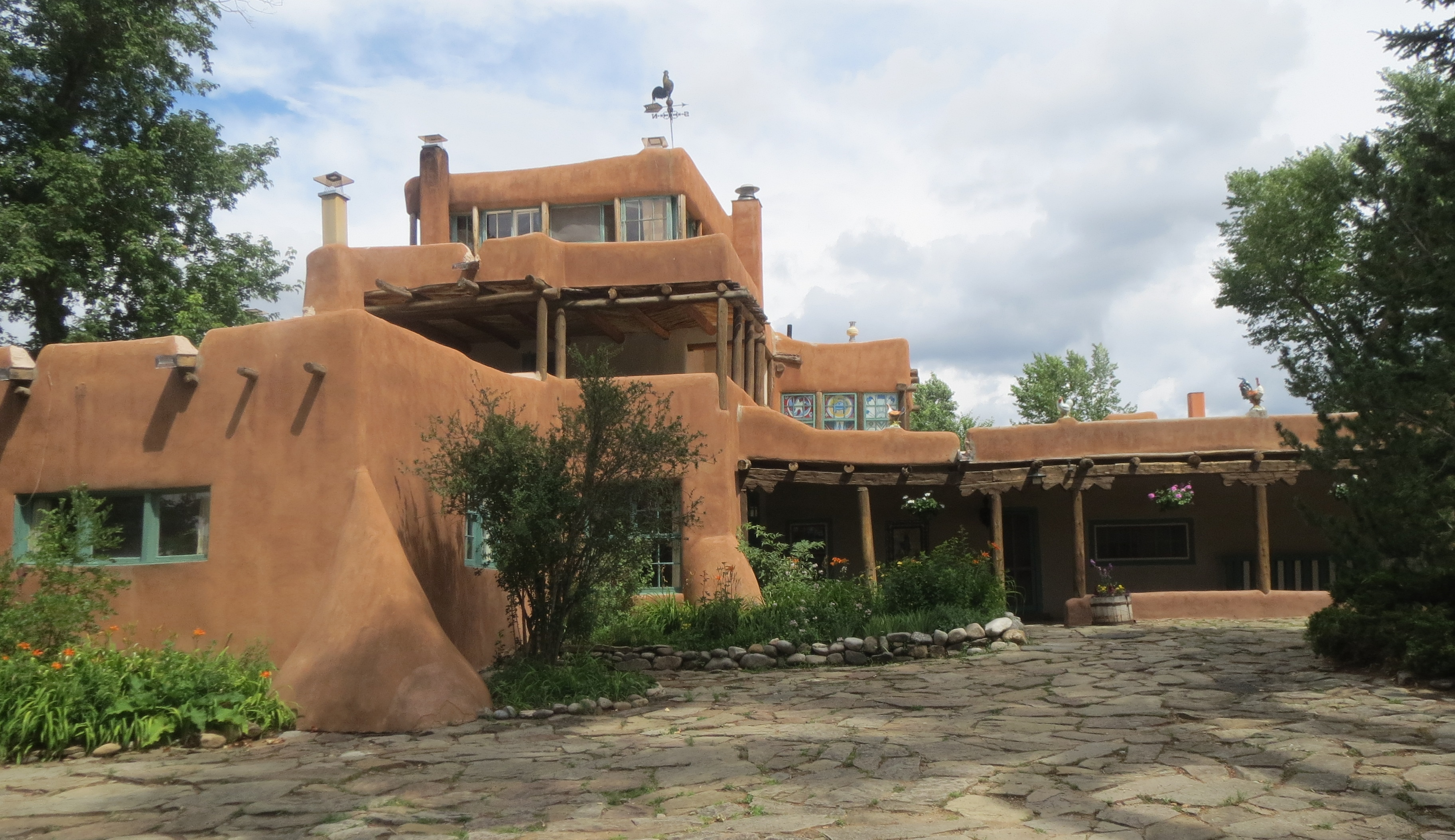
Mabel Dodge Luhan House

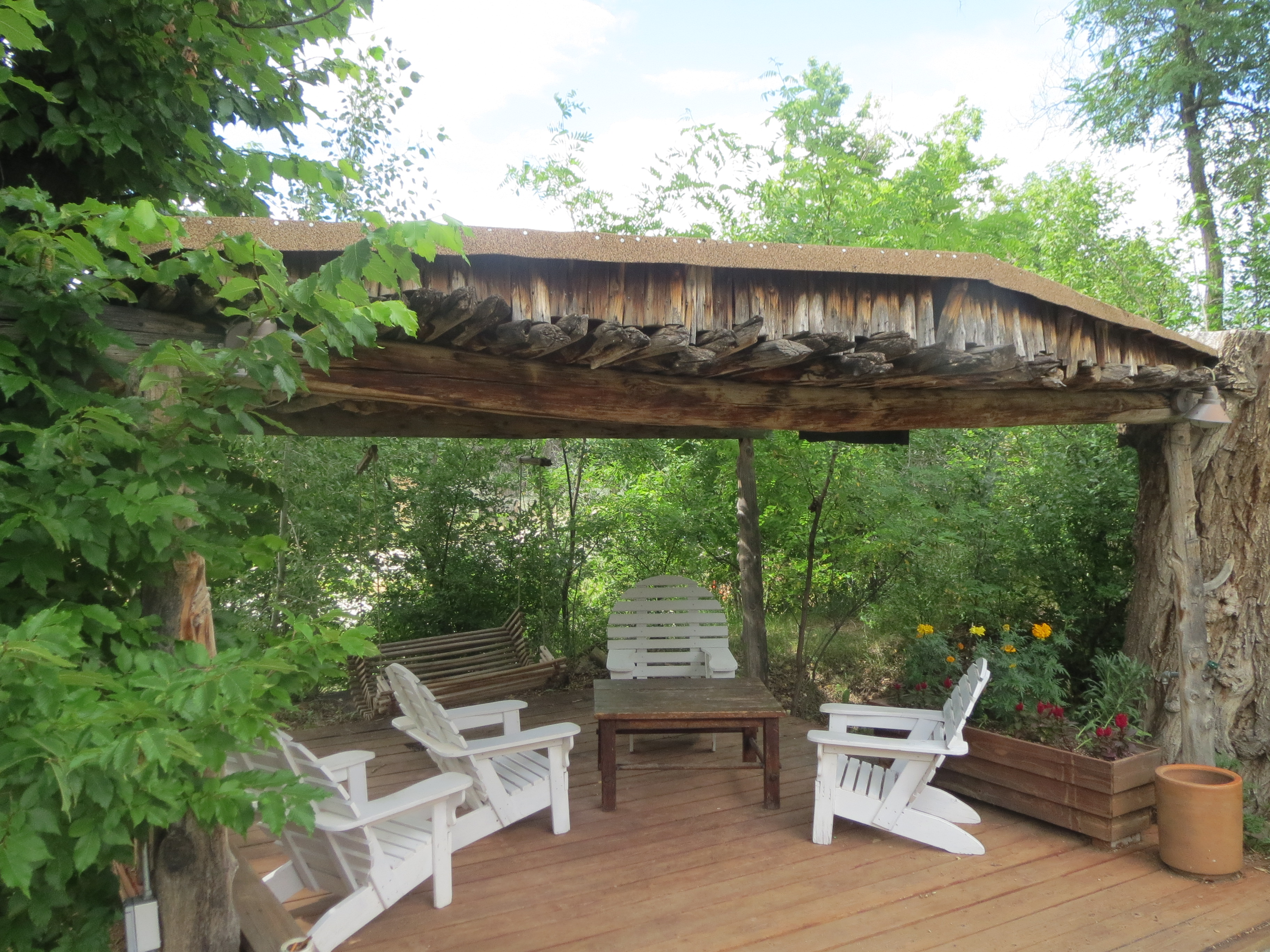
Outdoor deck

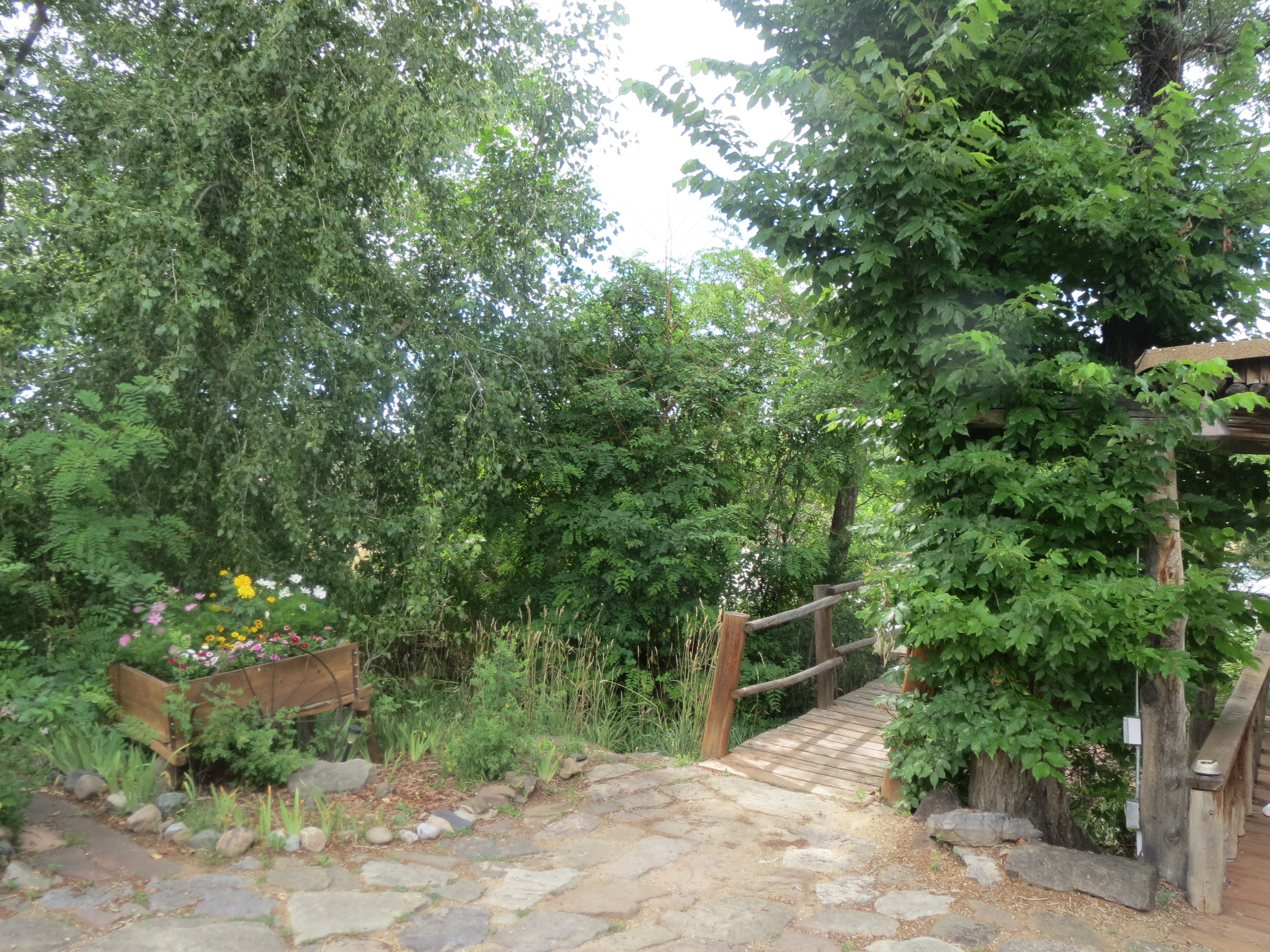
Garden

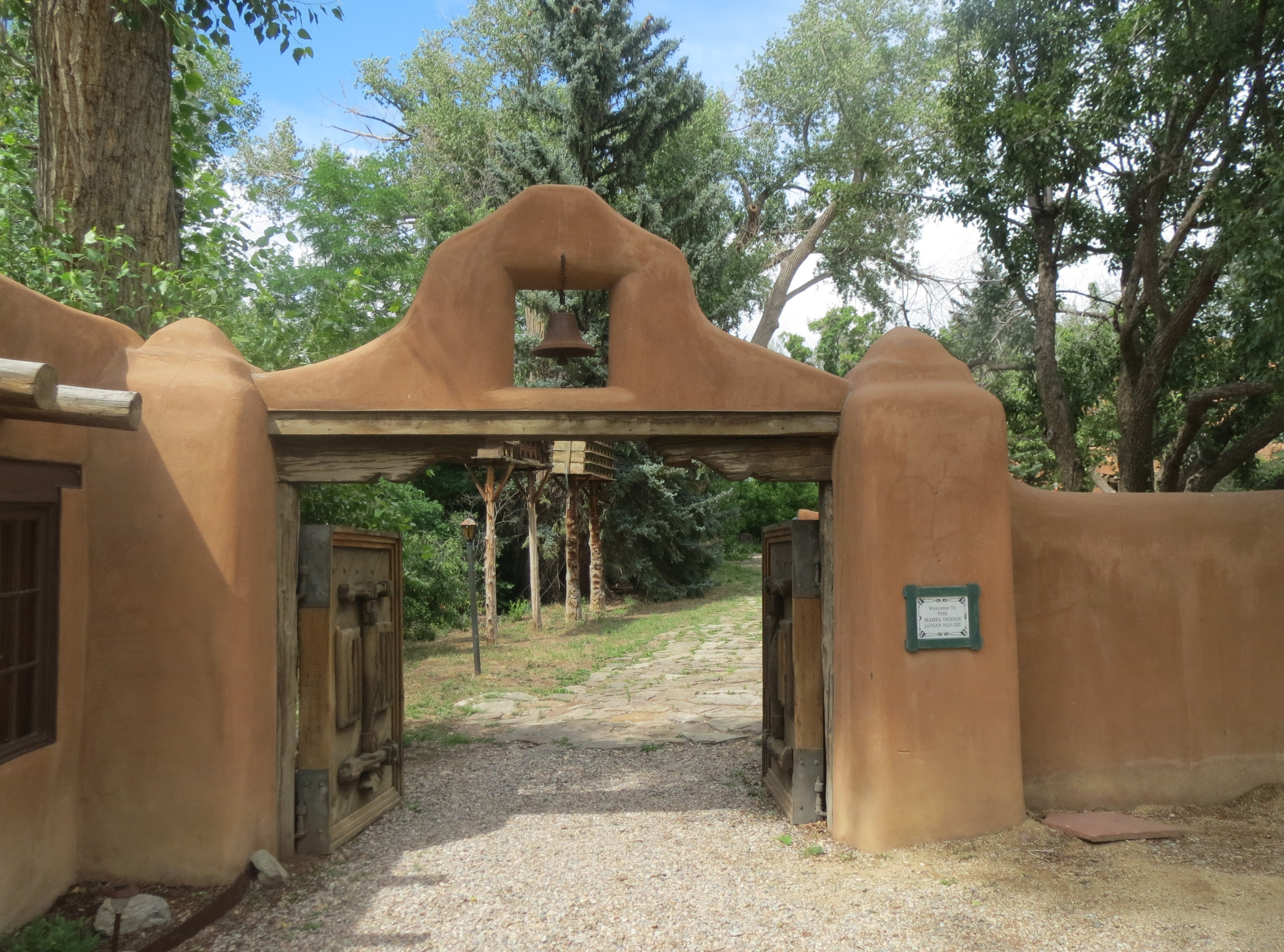
Entrance

== See also ==
- National Register of Historic Places listings in Taos County, New Mexico
- List of National Historic Landmarks in New Mexico
