= Margaret Catherine Alice Hyson =

American missionary (1861–1915)

Personal life
- Born: Margaret Catherine Alice Hyson; February 22, 1861 York County, Pennsylvania, U.S.
- Died: 8 March 1915 (aged 54) Pennsylvania
- Resting place: Round Hill Presbyterian Cemetery, East Hopewell Township, York County, Pennsylvania, U.S.
- Parent(s): John Hyson; Margaret (Miller) Hyson
- Education: Millersville University of Pennsylvania
- Other names: M.C. Alice Hyson; Alice Hyson

Religious life
- Religion: Presbyterian
- Institute: Presbyterian Church of America

Senior posting
- Period in office: 1884–1915

Margaret Catherine Alice Hyson (also known as M.C. Alice Hyson; Alice Hyson) (Feb. 22, 1861–March 8, 1915) was an American missionary. She spent 31 years as a missionary in the Western territories at a time when few white women were traveling to the West, to the Taos, New Mexico and Santa Fe de Nuevo México regions. Hyson would go on to build the John Hyson School in Chimayo, New Mexico, now the only remaining elementary Presbyterian mission school left in New Mexico. The mission at Ranchos de Taos, New Mexico was named for her: the Alice Hyson Mission, for her service to the Presbyterian Church of America. Aside from providing a religious and academic education, she also provided rudimentary health care.

== Family ==
Born on 22 February 1861, Alice was the daughter of John Hyson and Margaret (Miller) Hyson, of Hopewell Township in York County, Pennsylvania. Alice Hyson was the seventh child of 14 children. The family, devout Presbyterians of Scotch-Irish descent, attended the Round Hill Presbyterian Church in Stewartstown, Pennsylvania. Her siblings were:

- Jane Ann Hyson, 1848-1913
- John Miller Hyson, 1850-1931
- Elizabeth Mary Hyson, 1852-1921
- Robert Bortner Hyson, 1853-1930
- Sarah Mariah Hyson, 1855-1920
- Archibald Free Hyson, 1857-1945
- David A. Hyson, 1859-1936
- Cordelia Elwinda Hyson, 1863-1942
- Hanna Emma Abby Hyson, 1864-1947
- Clara Louisa Hyson, 1866-1889
- Zelia Gertrude Hyson, 1867–1931
- Pleasant C. Hyson, 1869–1967
- Bertha Olivia Hyson, 1873–1960

== Education ==
Alice Hyson and her thirteen siblings were educated at the Hyson School, a one-room school house located near their farm in rural York County. Alice attended Millersville Normal School, along with her sisters.

== Missionary work ==
In 1884, at the age of 23, Alice was sent by Faith Haines of the Women's Home Missionary Society of the Presbyterian Church, to the territory of New Mexico to begin her missionary service. The first school was a dark, poorly ventilated room in the house of Doña Antonia Montaño. Although the school was initially for boys only, Alice Hyson was able to reach girls as well by establishing a sewing class. "Then the mothers began to take as much pride in the girls as in the boys." After two years, the school moved to a small church. Around 1888, a new school building was built, with two classrooms and teachers' quarters.

Alice Hyson devoted 31 years of services as a Presbyterian missionary teacher at the plaza schools in Taos, New Mexico. She is noted for her work at Ranchos de Taos, the Presbyterian funded school. Her sisters Bertha and Cordelia also worked with her at various times.

== Death ==
Alice Hyson lived and worked in Ranchos de Taos until her health began to decline in 1915. Then she returned to her family in Pennsylvania. She died of cancer on March 8, 1915, and was buried in Round Hill Presbyterian Cemetery, East Hopewell Township, York, Pennsylvania. Her epitaph reads: "For God is not unrighteous to forget your work and labor of love which ye have shewed toward his name".
