= Taos Inn =

- U.S. National Register of Historic Places
- NM State Register of Cultural Properties
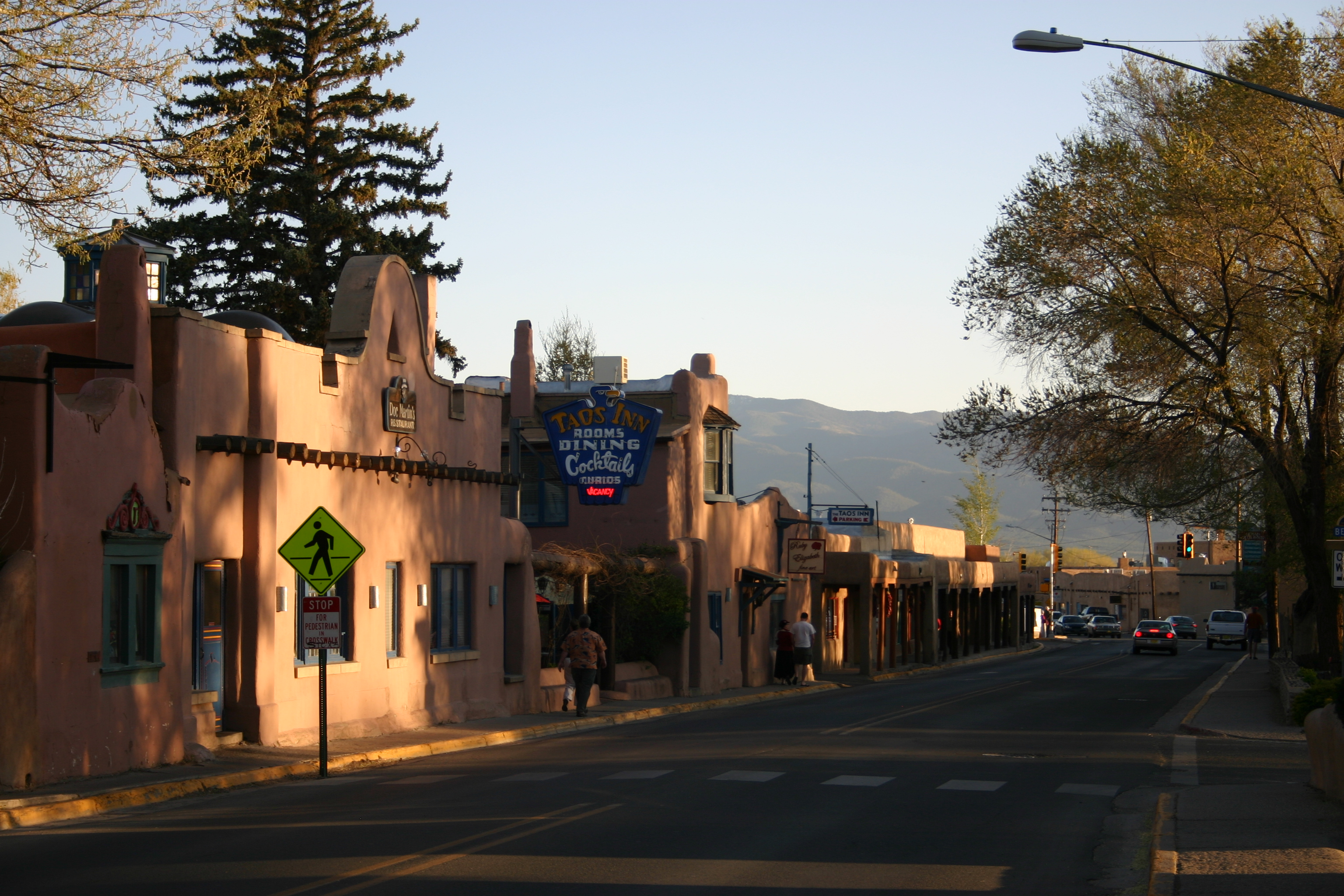
- Taos Inn

- Location within New Mexico
- Location: Paseo Del Pueblo Norte, Taos, New Mexico
- Coordinates: 36°24′28″N 105°34′20″W
- Area: 1.5 acres (0.61 ha)
- Built: 1934
- Architectural style: Pueblo, Colonial
- NRHP reference No.: 82003341
- NMSRCP No.: 802

Significant dates
- Added to NRHP: February 5, 1982
- Designated NMSRCP: April 3, 1981

Taos Inn is an historic inn located in Taos, New Mexico. It is made up of several adobe houses dating from the 19th century, one of which was a home of Thomas "Doc" Martin which hosted the formative meeting of the Taos Society of Artists in 1915. After Doc's death, his widow Helen Martin converted the houses into a hotel, which opened on June 7, 1936 as Hotel Martin. The name was changed to "Taos Inn" by subsequent owners.

It was added to the New Mexico State Register of Cultural Properties in 1981 and to the National Register of Historic Places in 1982.

The Taos Inn was acquired by Imprint Hospitality group in January 2019.

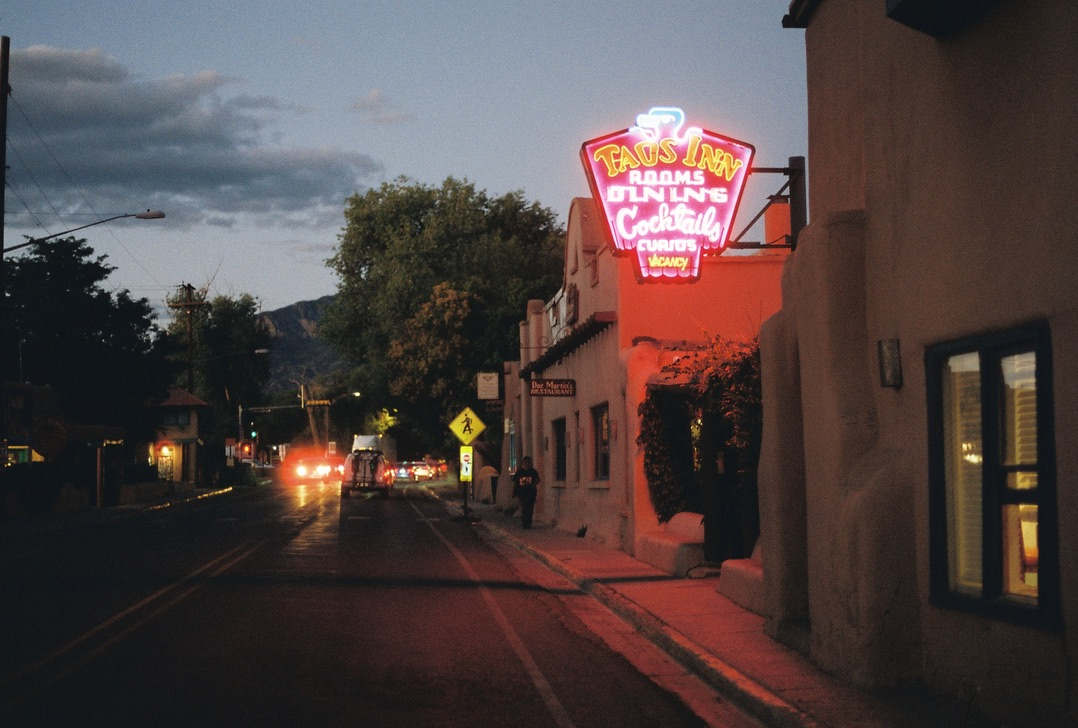
Taos Inn at dusk, shot on 35mm color film.

Taos Inn

== Doc Martin's restaurant ==
Taos Inn is home to Doc Martin's, a restaurant located in the former offices of Doc Martin. As of December 2018 Doc Martin's has won 29 annual Wine Spectator "Awards of Excellence".

Doc Martin's is famous for its Chile Rellenos and Award Winning Green Chile.

== Gallery ==
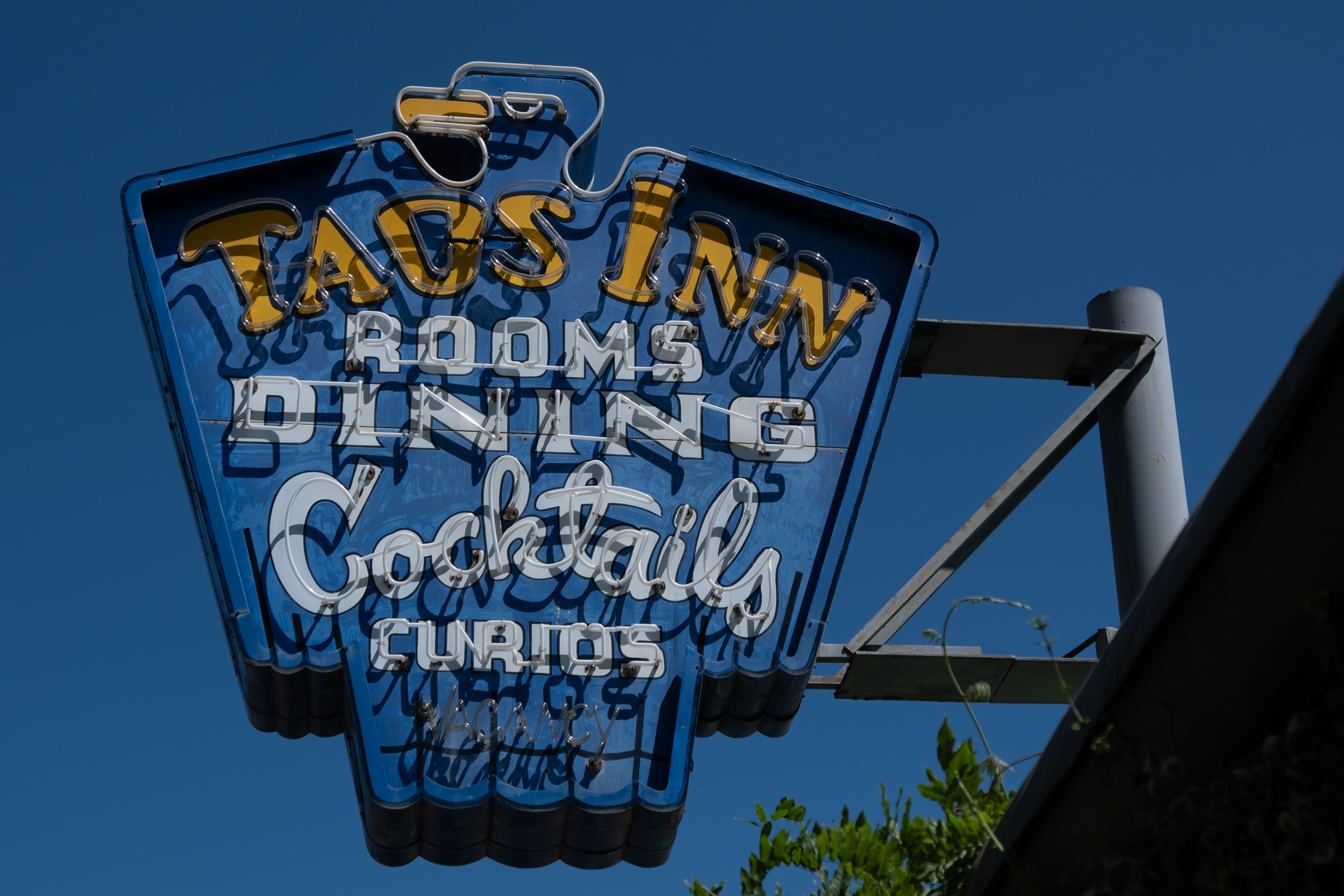
The Taos Inn sign

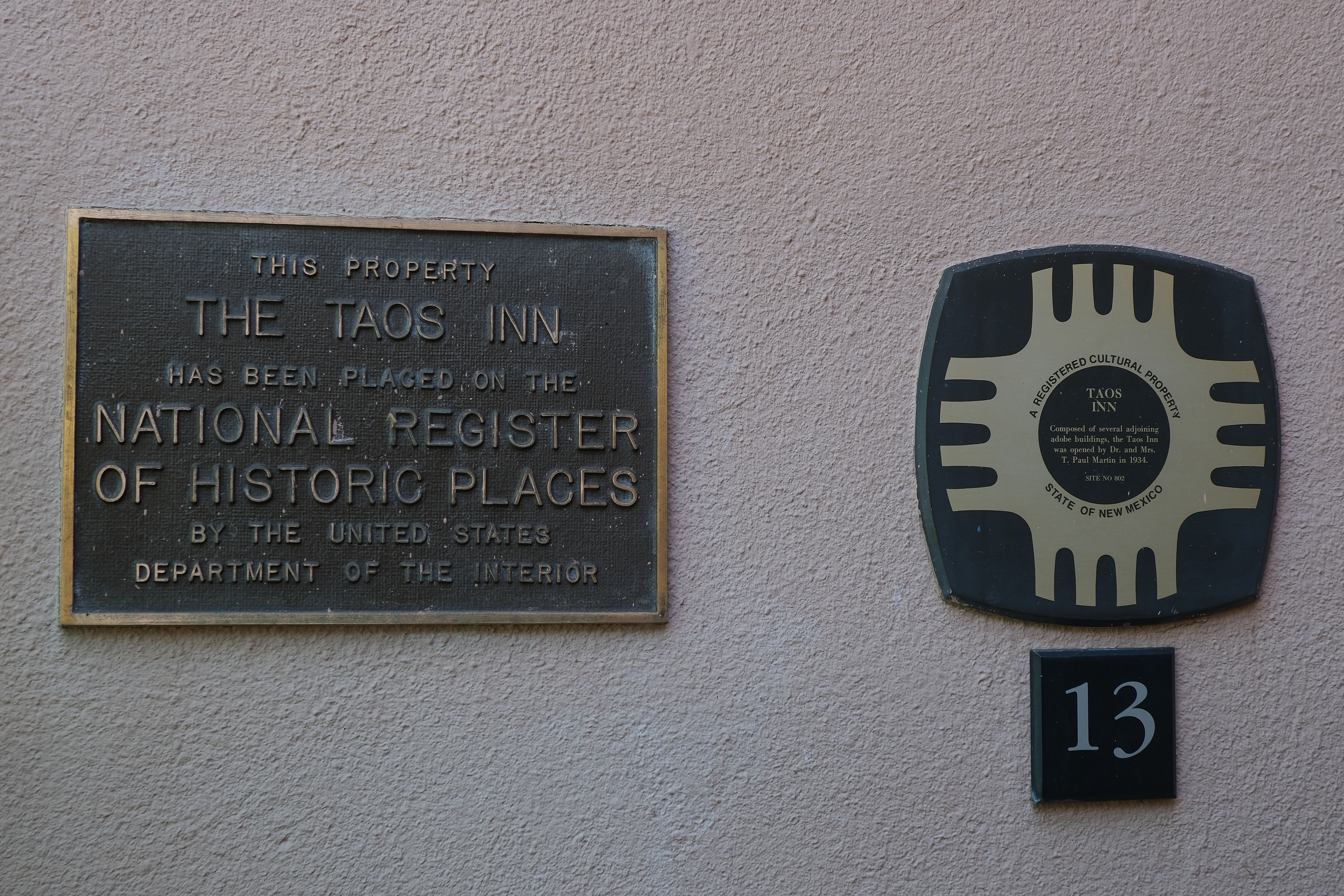
National Register of Historic Places Plaque at the Taos Inn

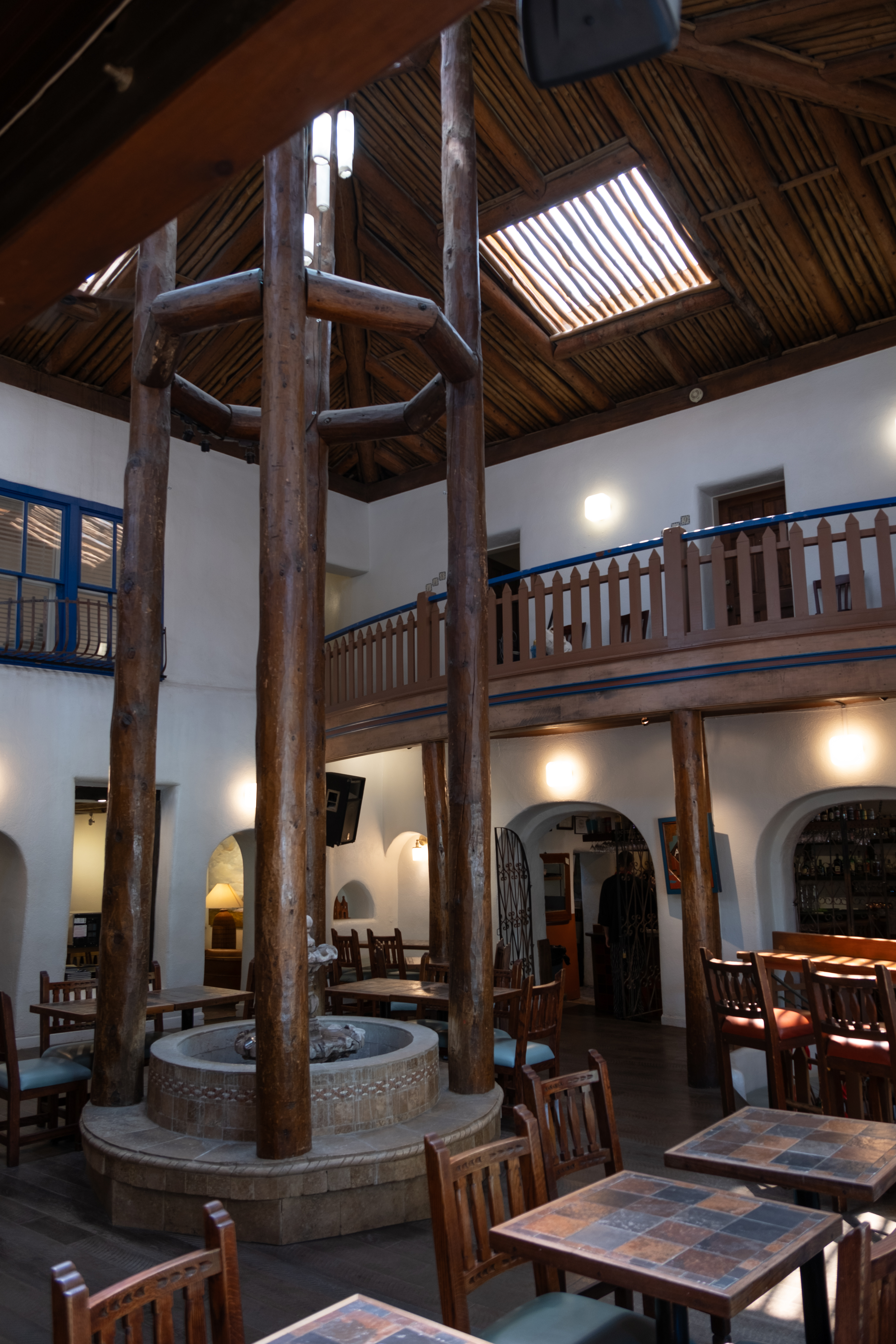
Interior of the Taos Inn

== See also ==
- National Register of Historic Places listings in Taos County, New Mexico
