= Doc Martin (disambiguation) =

Doc Martin is a British medical comedy-drama TV series.

Doc Martin may also refer to:

- Thomas "Doc" Martin (1864–1935), American physician
- Harold D. Martin (1899–1945), American football player
- Doc Martin (baseball) (1887–1935), American baseball player

== See also ==
- Dr. Martens, a shoe brand
- Doktor Martin (disambiguation)
