= Taos, New Mexico =

City in New Mexico, United States

- Town
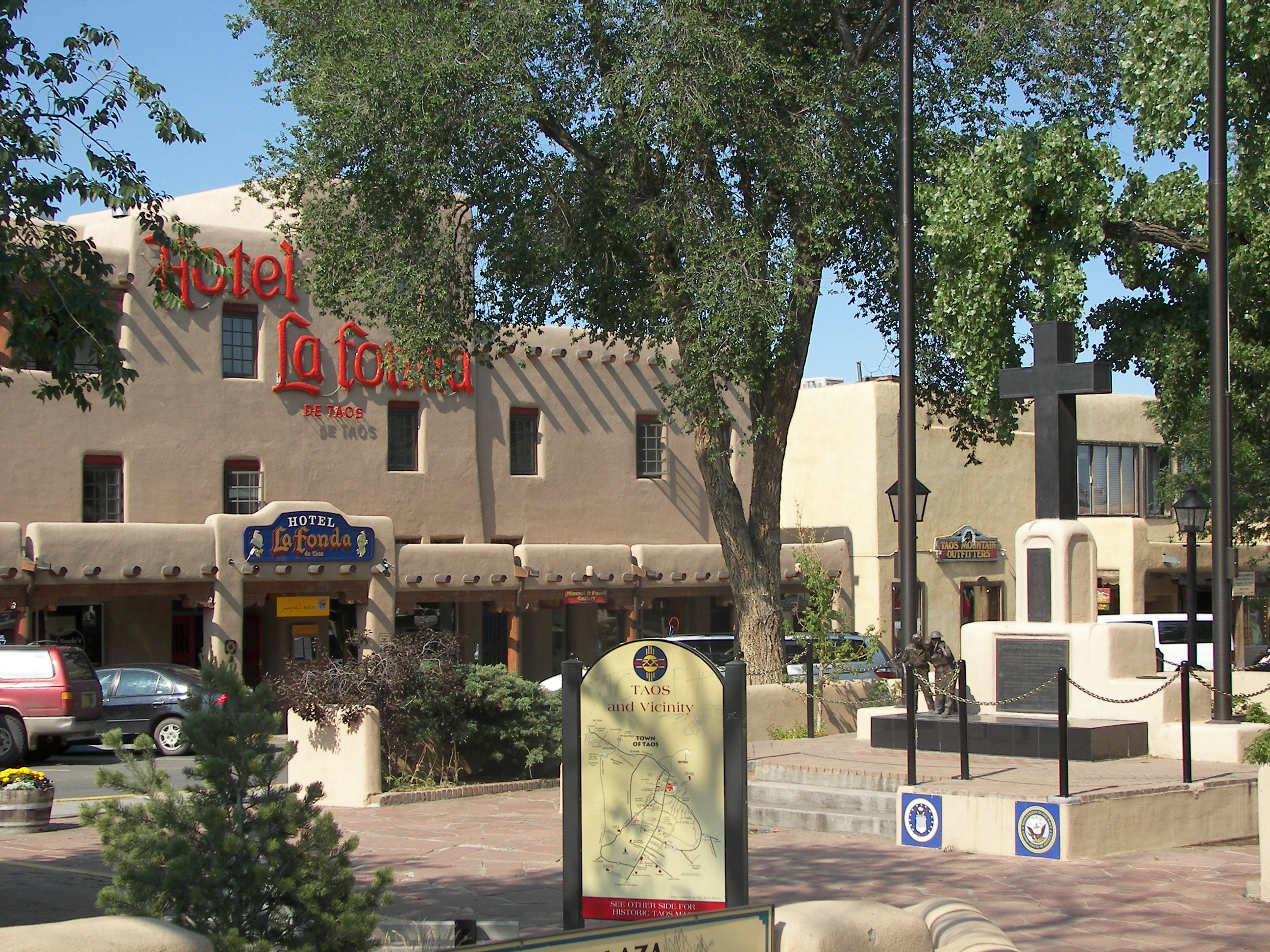
- Taos Plaza and the Hotel La Fonda, within the Taos Downtown Historic District

- Seal

- Location of Taos, New Mexico

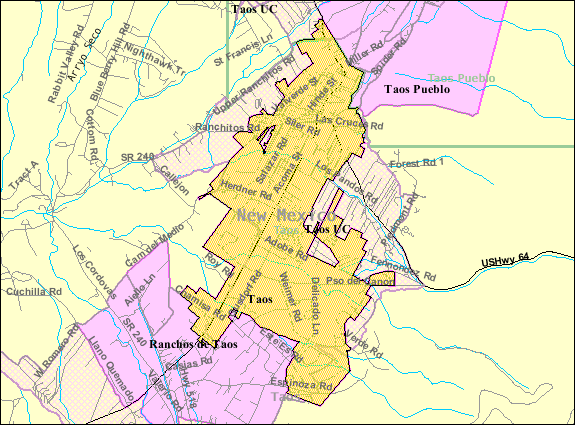
- U.S. Census map

- Location in New Mexico Location in the United States
- Coordinates: 36°23′13″N 105°34′48″W
- Country: United States
- State: New Mexico
- County: Taos
- Founded: 1795
- Incorporated: 1934
- Named for: Taos Pueblo

Government
  - Type: Mayor-council-manager
  - Mayor: Daniel Barrone

Area
  - Total: 6.04 sq mi (15.64 km^{2})
  - Land: 6.04 sq mi (15.64 km^{2})
  - Water: 0 sq mi (0.00 km^{2})
- Elevation: 6,969 ft (2,124 m)

Population (2020)
  - Total: 6,474
  - Density: 1,072.1/sq mi (413.94/km^{2})
- Time zone: UTC−7 (Mountain (MST))
  - Summer (DST): UTC−6 (MDT)
- ZIP code: 87571
- Area code: 575
- FIPS code: 35-76200
- GNIS feature ID: 2413366
- Website: taosnm.gov

Taos (/taʊs/) is a town in Taos County, in the north-central region of New Mexico. Situated between the Rio Grande Gorge and the Sangre de Cristo Mountains, it is located roughly 50 miles (80 km) south of the Colorado border. Taos serves as the county seat of Taos County, of which it is the largest municipality, with an estimated population of 6,567 as of 2021.

The town of Taos was incorporated in 1934, although humans have lived in the adjacent Taos Pueblo—a UNESCO World Heritage Site and the town's namesake—for roughly a millennium; the town's name derives from the native Taos language meaning "(place of) red willows". Initially founded by Spanish colonists in 1615 as Don Fernando de Taos, it was only intermittently occupied until the late 18th century, due to recurring conflict between European and indigenous peoples, most notably the Pueblo Revolt.

Taos was formally established as a permanent settlement in 1795 by Nuevo México Governor Fernando Chacón, serving as a fortified plaza and trading outpost for the neighboring Taos Pueblo and Hispano communities, including Ranchos de Taos, Cañon, Taos Canyon, Ranchitos, El Prado, and Arroyo Seco. During the Mexican–American War, the region was occupied by the United States, triggering a rebellion among Hispanics and American Indians known as the Taos Revolt.

Following U.S. annexation of Nuevo México, Taos became a stopover for American and European settlers along the vast western frontier. During this period, the town developed its existing reputation as a cultural enclave, with the first artist colony being established in 1898 by painters Ernest Blumenschein and Bert Phillips. Taos has since developed a reputation as a "counterculture mecca" and "beacon for artists", attracting the likes of painter Georgia O'Keeffe, English poet and writer D.H. Lawrence, and actor Dennis Hopper.

== History ==
=== Taos Pueblo ===
The Taos Pueblo, which borders the north boundary of the town of Taos, has been occupied for nearly a millennium. It is estimated that the pueblo was built between 1000 and 1450 AD, with some later expansion. The pueblo is considered to be one of the oldest continuously inhabited communities in the United States.

Located in a tributary valley off the Rio Grande, it is the most northern of the New Mexico pueblos. The pueblo, at some places five stories high, is a combination of many individual homes with common walls. There are over 1,900 Taos Puebloans living within the greater pueblo-area community. Many of them have modern homes near their fields and live there in the summer months, only staying at their homes within the main North or South pueblo buildings during cooler weather. About 150 people live within the main pueblo buildings year-round. The Taos Pueblo was added as a UNESCO World Heritage Site in 1992.

=== Spanish colonization ===
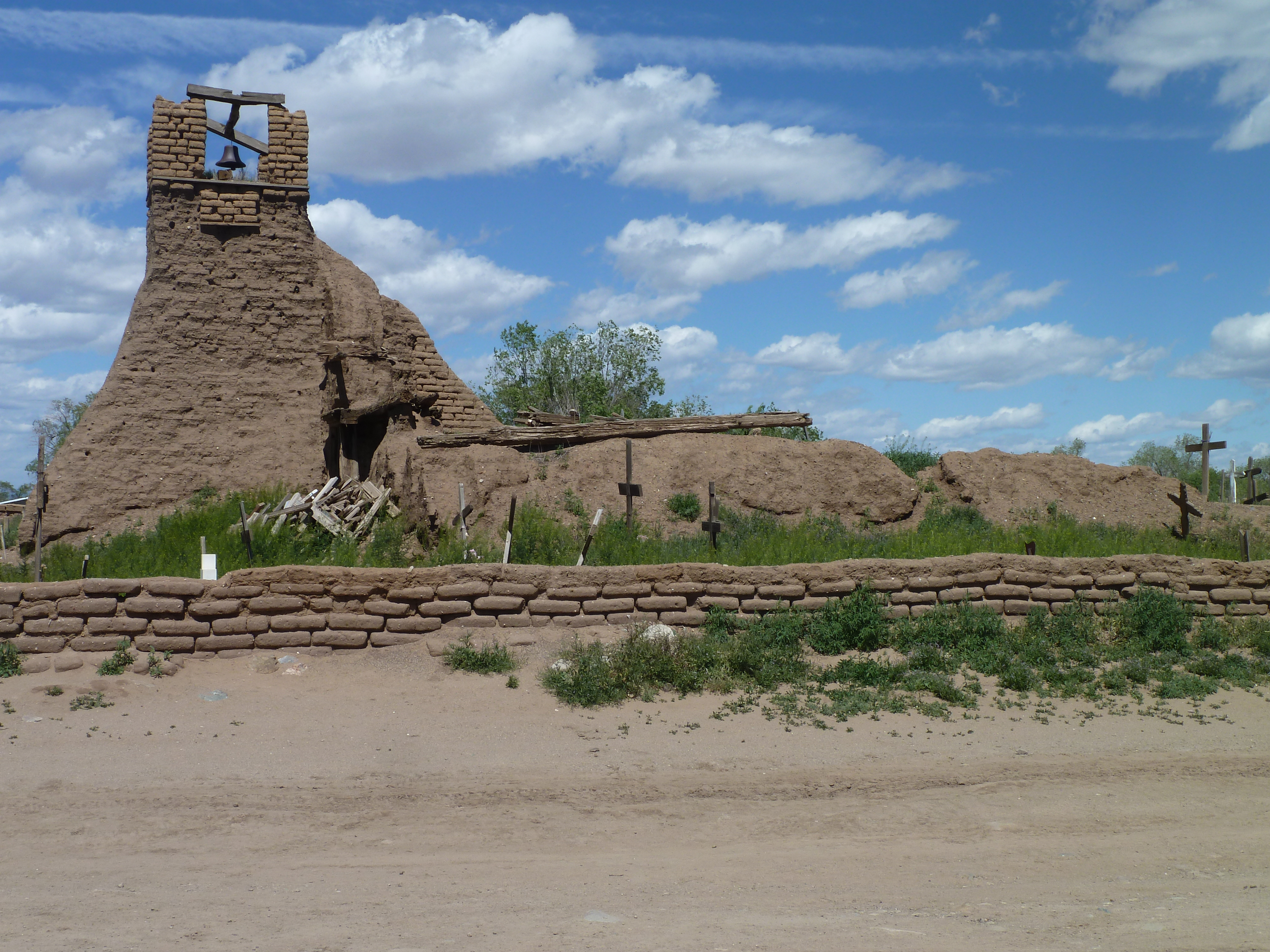
Old cemetery and ruins of original church, Taos Pueblo, New Mexico. Fray Pedro de Miranda, the Taos mission priest, was killed in 1640.

Taos was established c.1615 as Don Fernando de Taos, following the Spanish conquest of the Indian Pueblo villages. Initially, relations of the Spanish settlers with Taos Pueblo were amicable, but resentment of meddling by missionaries, and demands by encomenderos for tribute, led to a revolt in 1640; Taos Indians killed their priest and a number of Spanish settlers and subsequently fled the pueblo, not returning until 1661.

In 1680, Taos Pueblo joined the widespread Pueblo Revolt. After the Spanish Reconquest of 1692, Taos Pueblo continued armed resistance to the Spanish until 1696, when Governor Diego de Vargas defeated the Indians at Taos Canyon.

During the 1770s, Taos was repeatedly raided by Comanches who lived on the plains of what is now eastern Colorado. Juan Bautista de Anza, governor of the Province of New Mexico, led a successful punitive expedition in 1779 against the Comanches.

Between 1780 and 1800, Don Fernando de Taos (now simply Taos) was established. Between 1796 and 1797, the Don Fernando de Taos land grant gave land to 63 Spanish families in the Taos valley. It was built as a fortified plaza with adobe buildings and is now a central plaza surrounded by residential areas. Mountain men who trapped beaver nearby made Taos their home in the early 1800s.

=== U.S. territory and statehood ===
The U.S. took control of New Mexico in 1847 during the Mexican–American War. In response, Hispanics and American Indians in Taos staged a rebellion known as the Taos Revolt, in which the newly appointed U.S. Governor, Charles Bent, was killed. Mexico subsequently ceded the region to the U.S. pursuant to the Treaty of Guadalupe Hidalgo in 1848. New Mexico was a territory of the United States beginning in 1850 and became a state in 1912.

For historical reasons, the American flag is displayed continuously at Taos Plaza (both day and night). This derives from the time of the American Civil War, when Confederate sympathizers in the area attempted to remove the flag. Union officer Kit Carson sought to discourage this activity by having guards surround the area and fly the flag 24 hours a day.

Anton Docher, the "Padre of Isleta", first served as a priest in Taos before leaving for Isleta in 1891.

=== Taos art colony ===
Beginning in 1899, artists began to settle in Taos; six formed the Taos Society of Artists in 1915. In time, the Taos art colony developed. Many paintings were made of local scenes, especially of Taos Pueblo and activities there, as the artists often modelled Native Americans from the pueblo in their paintings. Some of the artists' studios have been preserved and may be viewed. These include the Ernest L. Blumenschein House, the Eanger Irving Couse House and Studio—Joseph Henry Sharp Studios, and the Nicolai Fechin House, all of which are listed on the National Register of Historic Places. Influential later 20th-century Taos artists include R. C. Gorman and Agnes Martin. A number of foundations host artist residencies in Taos, including the Helene Wurlitzer Foundation, which began hosting painters, writers, composers, sculptors, poets and filmmakers at Casa Encantado in 1954.

== Historic sites and tourism ==
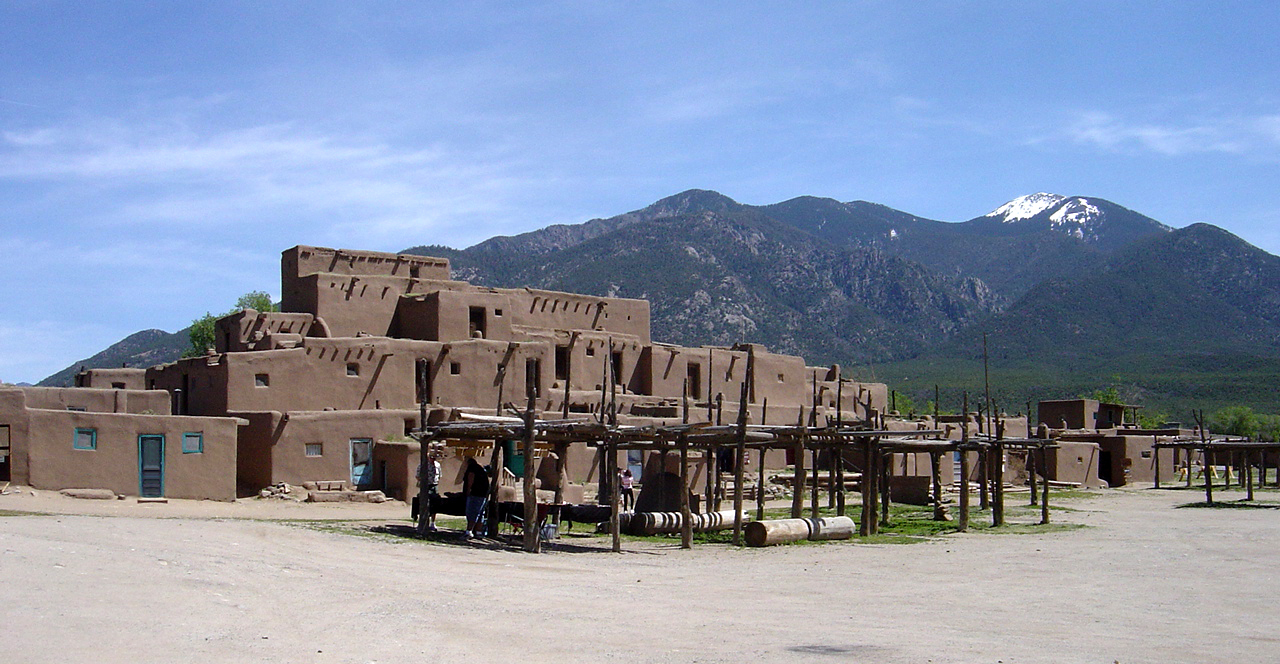
Taos Pueblo

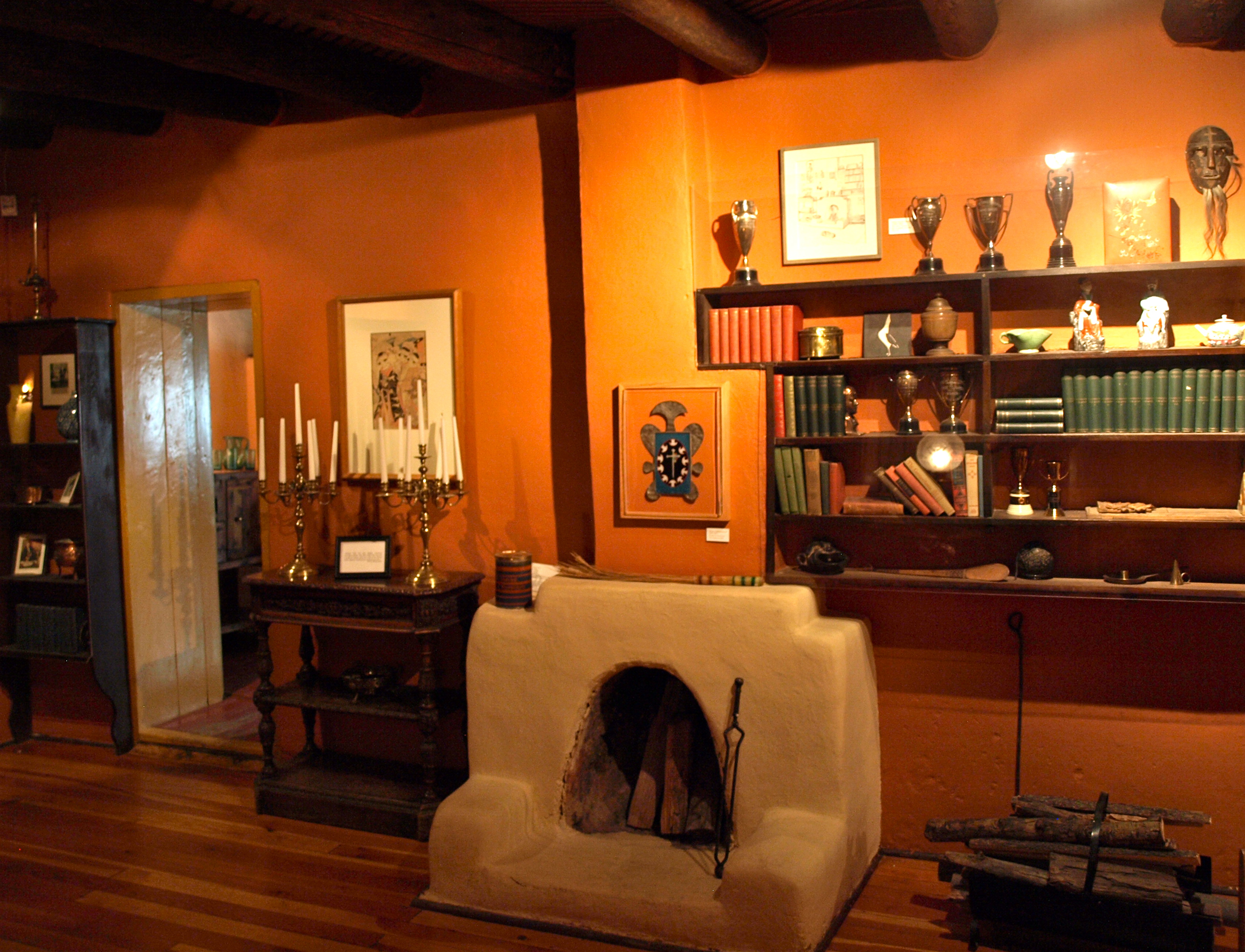
E.L. Blumenschein House Library, National Register of Historical Places

Taos is home to more than twenty sites on the National Register of Historic Places.

=== Pueblos ===
About 3 miles (4.8 km) north of Taos is Taos Pueblo. Picuris Pueblo is located about 25 miles (40 km) south.

=== Taos Fiestas ===
The Fiestas de Taos is an annual community celebration in the Taos Plaza honoring the feast of the two patron saints of Taos, Santa Ana and Santiago. It is normally celebrated the third weekend of July. A commemorative mass and procession from Our Lady of Guadalupe Church officially opens the event on Friday evening, followed by the crowning of the Fiestas Queen. The celebration continues with musical and dance performances scheduled on the plaza every hour. Two parades are staged, a children's parade on Saturday and the larger Fiesta Parade on Sunday.

=== Bent Street ===
Located just north of the Taos Plaza, this street was the location of Governor Charles Bent's home. Bent was scalped and killed by Pueblo warriors during the Taos Revolt on January 19, 1847.

=== Artists' homes and studios ===
==== Present ====
The Helene Wurlitzer Foundation is a non-profit organization based in Taos that provides free residency to eleven artists, with each year divided into three residency sessions of three months apiece at Casa Encantado.

Abbie Conant, former principal trombonist of the Munich Philharmonic Orchestra and seasonal Taos resident, runs a studio three blocks from the plaza. The studio can seat 60, and there is also a two-bedroom living space. In addition to her and her husband's own performances, the studio has hosted poetry readings, presentations, and performances from local Taoseñas and fellows from the Wurlitzer Foundation.

==== Historic ====
Many of the historic sites are homes and studios of artists, including the Mabel Dodge Luhan House, Eanger Irving Couse House and Studio—Joseph Henry Sharp Studios, the Nicolai Fechin House, the Leon Gaspard House, and the Ernest Martin Hennings House.

Doc Martin's restaurant in the historic Taos Inn was previously the office of Thomas "Doc" Martin, while other parts of the inn served as his home and the birthplace of the Taos Society of Artists. On Ledoux Street, just south of the Taos Plaza, is the Ernest L. Blumenschein House and Harwood House.

=== Other historic sites ===
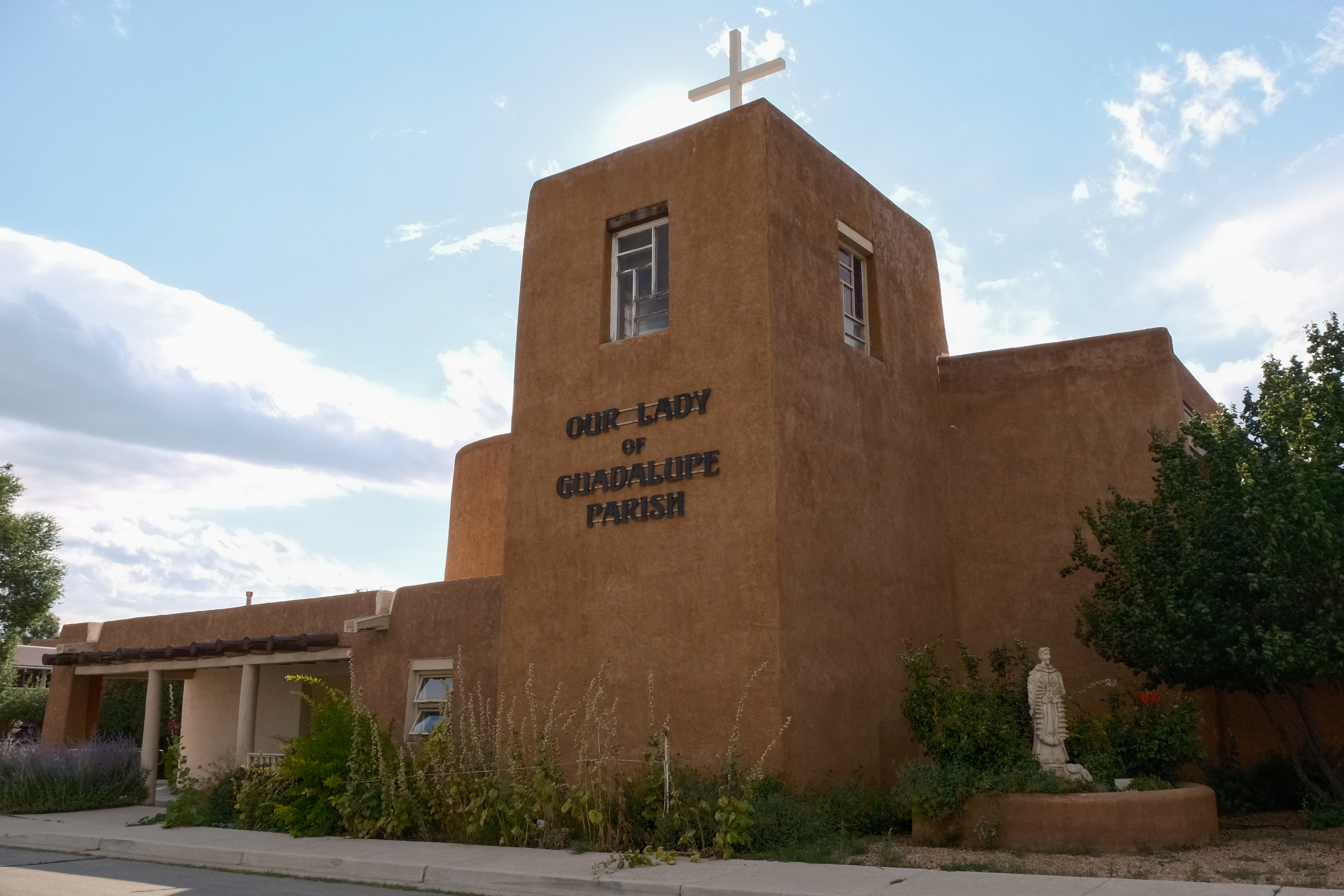
Our Lady of Guadalupe Parish in Taos

The center of the Taos Downtown Historic District is the Taos Plaza. Just west of that is the Our Lady of Guadalupe Church. North of the Taos Plaza is the Governor Charles Bent House and the Taos Inn. Further north in Taos is the Bernard Beimer House. On the southwestern edge of the Taos Historic district is La Loma Plaza Historic District. East of the plaza on Kit Carson Road is the Kit Carson House.

North of Taos is the Turley Mill and Distillery Site and the Rio Grande Gorge Bridge. Just outside Taos in Ranchitos is the Martinez Hacienda, the home turned museum of the late Padre Antonio José Martínez. South of Taos is the Ranchos de Taos Plaza with the San Francisco de Asis Mission Church.

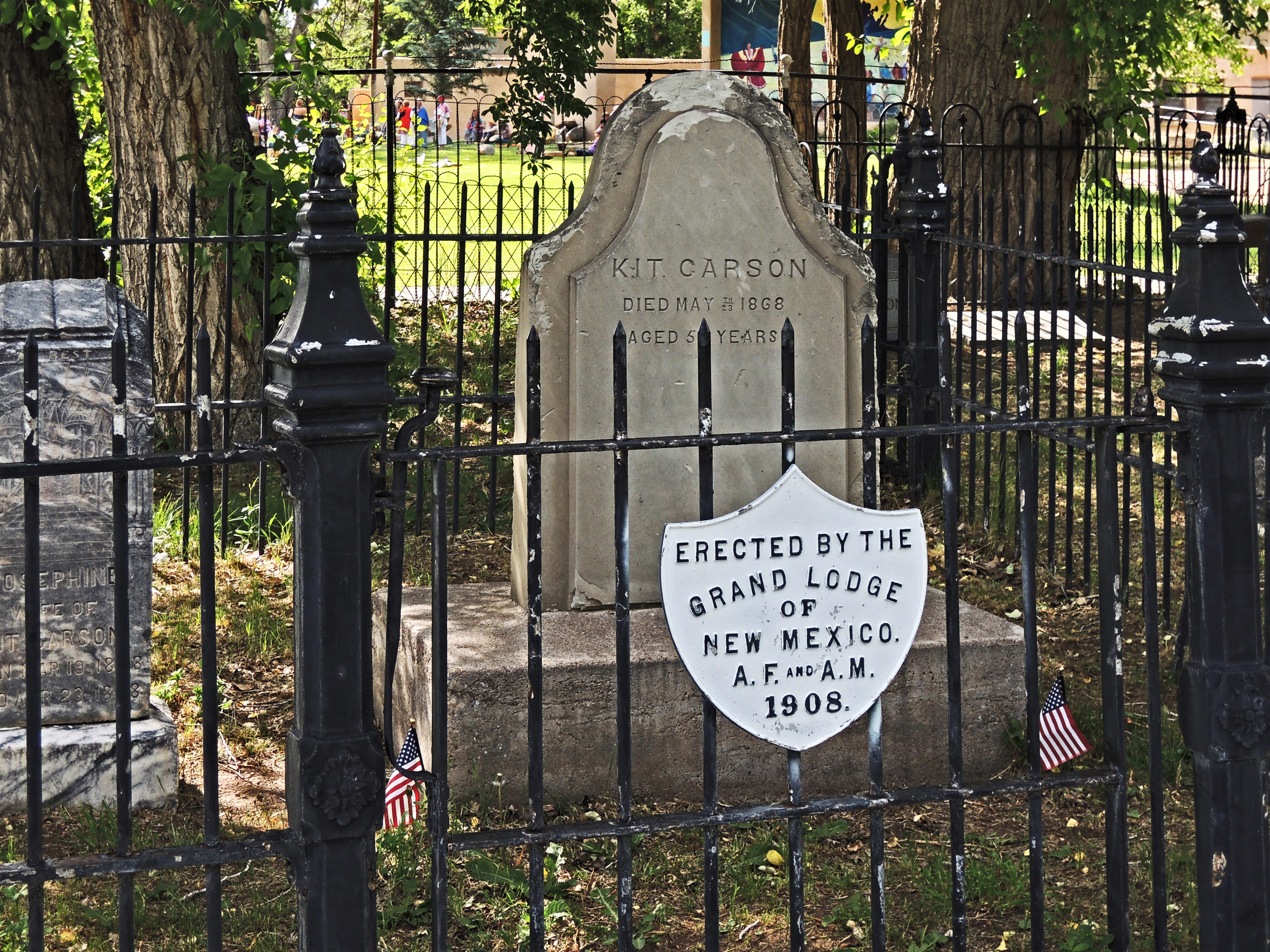
Kit Carson gravestone and burial plot

About 20 miles (32 km) northwest is the D. H. Lawrence Ranch (originally known as the Kiowa Ranch and now owned by the University of New Mexico), the home of the English novelist in the 1920s. It is believed that his ashes are buried there at the D. H. Lawrence Memorial.

=== Arts ===
There are three art museums in Taos: Harwood Museum of Art, Taos Art Museum, and Millicent Rogers Museum. They contain art by Pueblo Native Americans, Taos Society of Artists, and modern and contemporary artists of the Taos art colony. The town has more than 80 art galleries, and there are several houses of the Taos Society of Artists.

There are several local venues for the performing arts in Taos. The Taos Center for the Arts (TCA) draws nationally renowned and local performers at the Taos Community Auditorium. They also present independent film series. Three chamber music groups perform at TCA: Taos School of Music, Taos Chamber Music Group, and Music from Angel Fire. The Harwood Museum of Art also hosts performances and lectures. The Town of Taos Convention Center offers a venue for other local performances.

The Taos Talking Pictures Film Festival was a film festival held in the town from the mid-1990s to 2003. The festival's top prize was 5 acres (2.0 ha) of land.

=== Recreation ===
The Carson National Forest and Rio Grande del Norte National Monument provide many opportunities for recreation, such as hiking, skiing, fly fishing, horseback riding, golfing, hot air ballooning, llama trekking, rafting, and mountain biking. The South Boundary National Recreation Trail, east of town in Carson National Forest, is consistently ranked the best mountain bike trail in New Mexico.

There are also numerous hot springs along the Rio Grande and in the Taos Mountains. Ojo Caliente offers locations where visitors can enjoy access to mineral springs as well as massages and other spa treatments. Among hot springs in the area is a historical site called Stage Coach, which used to double as a brothel during the times of the Old West. Nearby, the Cumbres & Toltec Scenic Railroad provides a ride through the Toltec Gorge and Rocky Mountain passes in an authentic narrow-gauge steam railroad.

In the winter, many people come to Taos to ski in the mountains. Nearby Wheeler Peak, at 13,161 feet (4,011 m), is the highest peak in New Mexico. The Taos area has four ski areas – Taos Ski Valley, Red River ski area, Sipapu and Angel Fire ski area. Other winter activities include hot air ballooning, horseback riding, snow-shoeing, cross-country skiing, ski skating, ice skating, ice fishing and snowmobiling.

== Demographics ==
Historical population
Census	Pop.	Note	%±
1940	965		—
1950	1,815		88.1%
1960	2,163		19.2%
1970	2,475		14.4%
1980	3,369		36.1%
1990	4,065		20.7%
2000	4,700		15.6%
2010	5,716		21.6%
2020	6,474		13.3%
U.S. Decennial Census

Taos is the principal town of the Taos, NM, Micropolitan Statistical Area, which includes all of Taos County.

=== 2020 census ===
As of the 2020 census, Taos had a population of 6,474. The median age was 50.4 years. 17.1% of residents were under the age of 18 and 30.2% of residents were 65 years of age or older. For every 100 females there were 87.2 males, and for every 100 females age 18 and over there were 83.7 males age 18 and over.

98.7% of residents lived in urban areas, while 1.3% lived in rural areas.

There were 3,165 households in Taos, of which 22.5% had children under the age of 18 living in them. Of all households, 28.8% were married-couple households, 22.7% were households with a male householder and no spouse or partner present, and 40.4% were households with a female householder and no spouse or partner present. About 42.2% of all households were made up of individuals and 21.9% had someone living alone who was 65 years of age or older.

There were 3,812 housing units, of which 17.0% were vacant. The homeowner vacancy rate was 2.3% and the rental vacancy rate was 7.4%.

Racial composition as of the 2020 census
Race	Number	Percentage
White	3,830	59.2%
Black or African American	44	0.7%
American Indian and Alaska Native	321	5.0%
Asian	78	1.2%
Native Hawaiian and Other Pacific Islander	3	0.0%
Some other race	717	11.1%
Two or more races	1,481	22.9%
Hispanic or Latino (of any race)	2,853	44.1%

=== 2010 census ===
As of the 2010 census Taos had a population of 5,716. The median age was 44. The ethnic and racial composition of the population was 40.1% non-Hispanic white, 0.7% African American, 1% Asian, 5.3% Native American, 0.3% non-Hispanics reporting some other race, 5.4% reporting two or more races and 51.9% Hispanic or Latino of any race.

=== 2000 census ===
As of the census of 2000, there were 4,700 people, 2,067 households, and 1,157 families residing in the town. The population density was 874.5 inhabitants per square mile (337.6/km^{2}). There were 2,466 housing units at an average density of 458.8 per square mile (177.1/km^{2}). The racial makeup of the town was 68.04% White, 0.53% African American, 4.11% Native American, 0.62% Asian, 0.11% Pacific Islander, 21.66% from other races, and 4.94% from two or more races. Hispanic or Latino people of any race were 54.34% of the population.

There were 2,067 households, out of which 27.5% had children under the age of 18 living with them, 34.7% were married couples living together, 16.2% had a female householder with no husband present, and 44.0% were non-families. 37.3% of all households were made up of individuals, and 12.1% had someone living alone who was 65 years of age or older. The average household size was 2.18 and the average family size was 2.87.

In the town, the population was spread out, with 23% under the age of 18, 6.6% from 18 to 24, 26.4% from 25 to 44, 27.8% from 45 to 64, and 16.2% who were 65 years of age or older. The median age was 41 years. For every 100 females, there were 85 males. For every 100 females age 18 and over, there were 81.3 males.

The median income for a household in the town was $25,016, and the median income for a family was $33,564. Males had a median income of $27,683 versus $23,326 for females. The per capita income for the town was $15,983. About 17.9% of families and 23.1% of the population were below the poverty line, including 26.8% of those under age 18 and 24.4% of those age 65 or over.

== Geography and climate ==
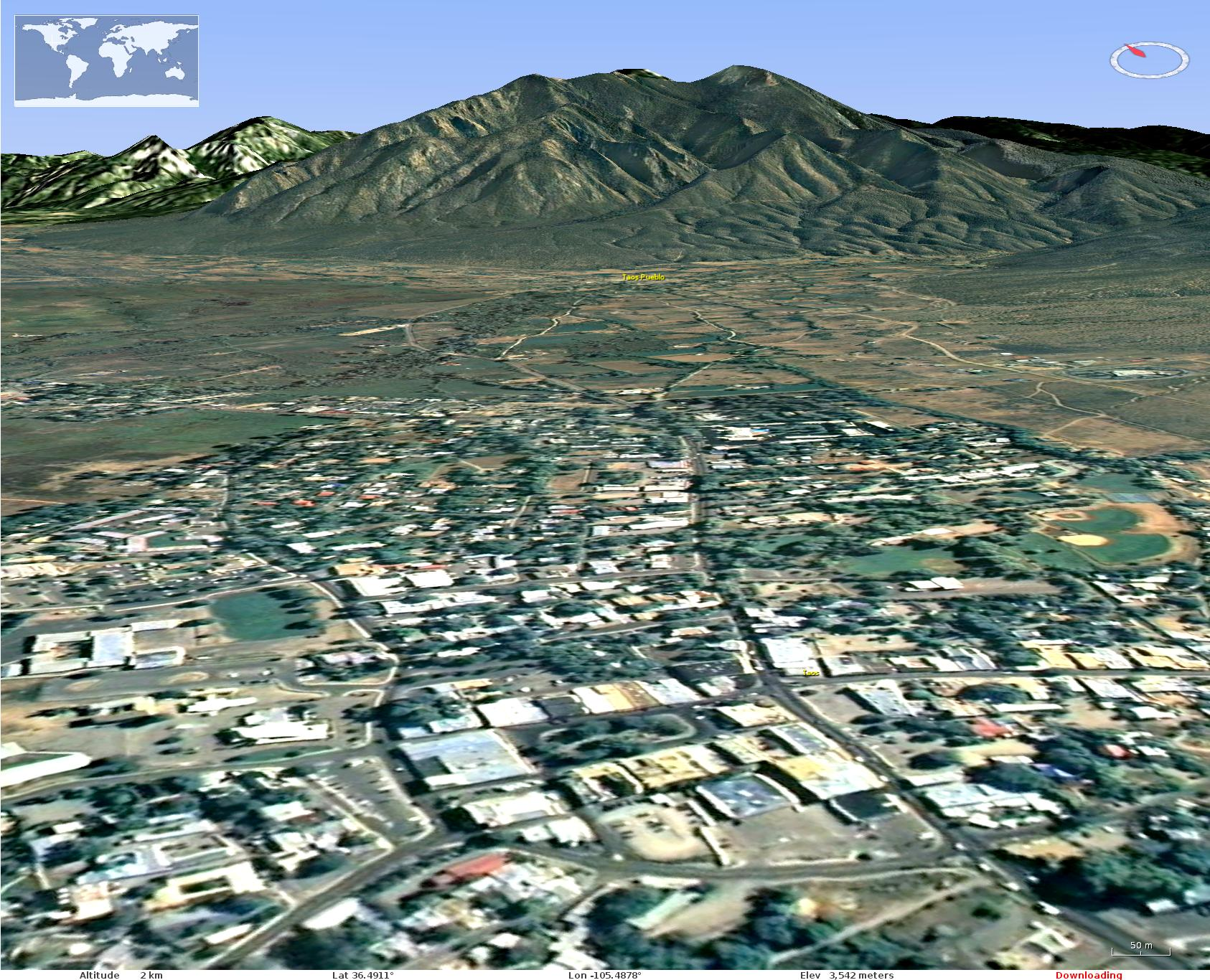
View north from Taos Plaza toward Taos Mountain (NASA WorldWind)

Taos is located at 36°23′38″N 105°34′36″W (36.393979, −105.576705).

The town has a total area of 5.4 square miles (14 km^{2}), all land.

Taos is located within two watersheds, categorized as subwatersheds or HUC12s in the United States. The town is mostly located in the Outlet Rio Fernando del Taos Watershed, where its two waterbodies are rated as impaired. A coalition of local organizations are working to improve the watershed's health. The northern edge of town is within the Rio Fernando del Taos-Rio Pueblo del Taos Watershed.

Just to the west of Taos is the Rio Grande Gorge, cutting through the basalt flows of the Taos Plateau volcanic field and crossed by the Rio Grande Gorge Bridge, now a part of U.S. Route 64.

The elevation of the town is 6,969 feet (2,124 m). Just north of Taos is Wheeler Peak, at 13,161 feet (4,011 m), the highest point in New Mexico. Taos has a warm-summer humid continental climate (Köppen Dfb), though it borders on a semi-arid climate (BSk) due to the low rainfall. The town is characterized by extreme diurnal variations of temperature. Even when summer days get extremely hot, nights cool off considerably.

Climate data for Taos, New Mexico, 1991–2020 normals, extremes 1892–2016
Month	Jan	Feb	Mar	Apr	May	Jun	Jul	Aug	Sep	Oct	Nov	Dec	Year
Record high °F (°C)	66 (19)	73 (23)	80 (27)	82 (28)	99 (37)	98 (37)	101 (38)	99 (37)	95 (35)	89 (32)	83 (28)	67 (19)	101 (38)
Mean maximum °F (°C)	53.8 (12.1)	59.4 (15.2)	68.7 (20.4)	75.6 (24.2)	83.4 (28.6)	91.5 (33.1)	93.2 (34.0)	90.5 (32.5)	86.2 (30.1)	77.8 (25.4)	66.7 (19.3)	56.1 (13.4)	93.9 (34.4)
Mean daily maximum °F (°C)	42.1 (5.6)	46.4 (8.0)	55.2 (12.9)	63.0 (17.2)	72.9 (22.7)	83.7 (28.7)	86.5 (30.3)	84.2 (29.0)	78.1 (25.6)	67.0 (19.4)	53.1 (11.7)	42.4 (5.8)	64.6 (18.1)
Daily mean °F (°C)	27.1 (−2.7)	32.9 (0.5)	40.2 (4.6)	46.8 (8.2)	55.0 (12.8)	65.5 (18.6)	69.6 (20.9)	67.7 (19.8)	61.4 (16.3)	49.7 (9.8)	37.8 (3.2)	28.0 (−2.2)	48.5 (9.2)
Mean daily minimum °F (°C)	12.2 (−11.0)	19.4 (−7.0)	25.3 (−3.7)	30.5 (−0.8)	37.1 (2.8)	47.4 (8.6)	52.7 (11.5)	51.3 (10.7)	44.8 (7.1)	32.3 (0.2)	22.4 (−5.3)	13.6 (−10.2)	32.4 (0.2)
Mean minimum °F (°C)	−3.3 (−19.6)	−1.0 (−18.3)	10.5 (−11.9)	19.8 (−6.8)	26.6 (−3.0)	36.5 (2.5)	45.3 (7.4)	44.3 (6.8)	32.1 (0.1)	19.0 (−7.2)	6.4 (−14.2)	−4.9 (−20.5)	−9.6 (−23.1)
Record low °F (°C)	−27 (−33)	−27 (−33)	−11 (−24)	0 (−18)	13 (−11)	28 (−2)	34 (1)	36 (2)	22 (−6)	0 (−18)	−21 (−29)	−27 (−33)	−27 (−33)
Average precipitation inches (mm)	0.67 (17)	0.45 (11)	0.71 (18)	0.83 (21)	1.22 (31)	0.86 (22)	1.53 (39)	1.77 (45)	1.37 (35)	1.34 (34)	0.88 (22)	1.07 (27)	12.70 (323)
Average snowfall inches (cm)	6.0 (15)	3.3 (8.4)	4.0 (10)	1.9 (4.8)	0.0 (0.0)	0.0 (0.0)	0.0 (0.0)	0.0 (0.0)	0.0 (0.0)	1.4 (3.6)	2.8 (7.1)	9.0 (23)	28.4 (71.9)
Average precipitation days (≥ 0.01 in)	3.7	3.5	4.4	3.8	4.9	4.8	7.2	10.2	5.8	4.6	3.9	4.2	61.0
Average snowy days (≥ 0.1 in)	2.6	2.4	1.2	1.0	0.0	0.0	0.0	0.0	0.0	0.5	1.2	3.1	12.0
Source 1: NOAA
Source 2: XMACIS2 (mean maxima/minima, snow depth 1981–2010)

=== Mud season ===
Dirt roads and driveways in Taos can experience a particularly bad mud season when winter weather is followed by unseasonably warm temperatures. This occurs because area soil is heavy with silt, which makes it vulnerable to frost heaving.

== Education ==
The town's public schools operated by Taos Municipal Schools include Arroyos del Norte Elementary School, Enos García Elementary (also Taos Elementary School), Ranchos Elementary School, Taos Middle School, Taos High School and Taos Cyber Magnet School.

Charter schools include Anansi Charter School, Taos Academy (State Charter), Taos Municipal Charter School and Vista Grande High School. Also in the area are additional alternative and private schools: Chrysalis Alternative School, Sped Discipline, Yaxche Private School, Taos Christian Academy, and San Francisco De Asis School. The Bureau of Indian Education-operated Taos Day School is in nearby Taos Pueblo.

Dallas-based Southern Methodist University operates a 295-acre (119 ha) campus at Fort Burgwin in Taos.

Albuquerque-based University of New Mexico (UNM) operates a community campus in Taos, with eight affiliated buildings in Taos, such as the UNM Harwood Museum of Art and Taos High School where some classes are held.

The Earthship Academy (or Earthship Biotecture Academy) is offering training in Earthship design principles, construction methods and philosophy. Earthship is a particular type of sustainable architecture and design, based around solar power.

== Government ==
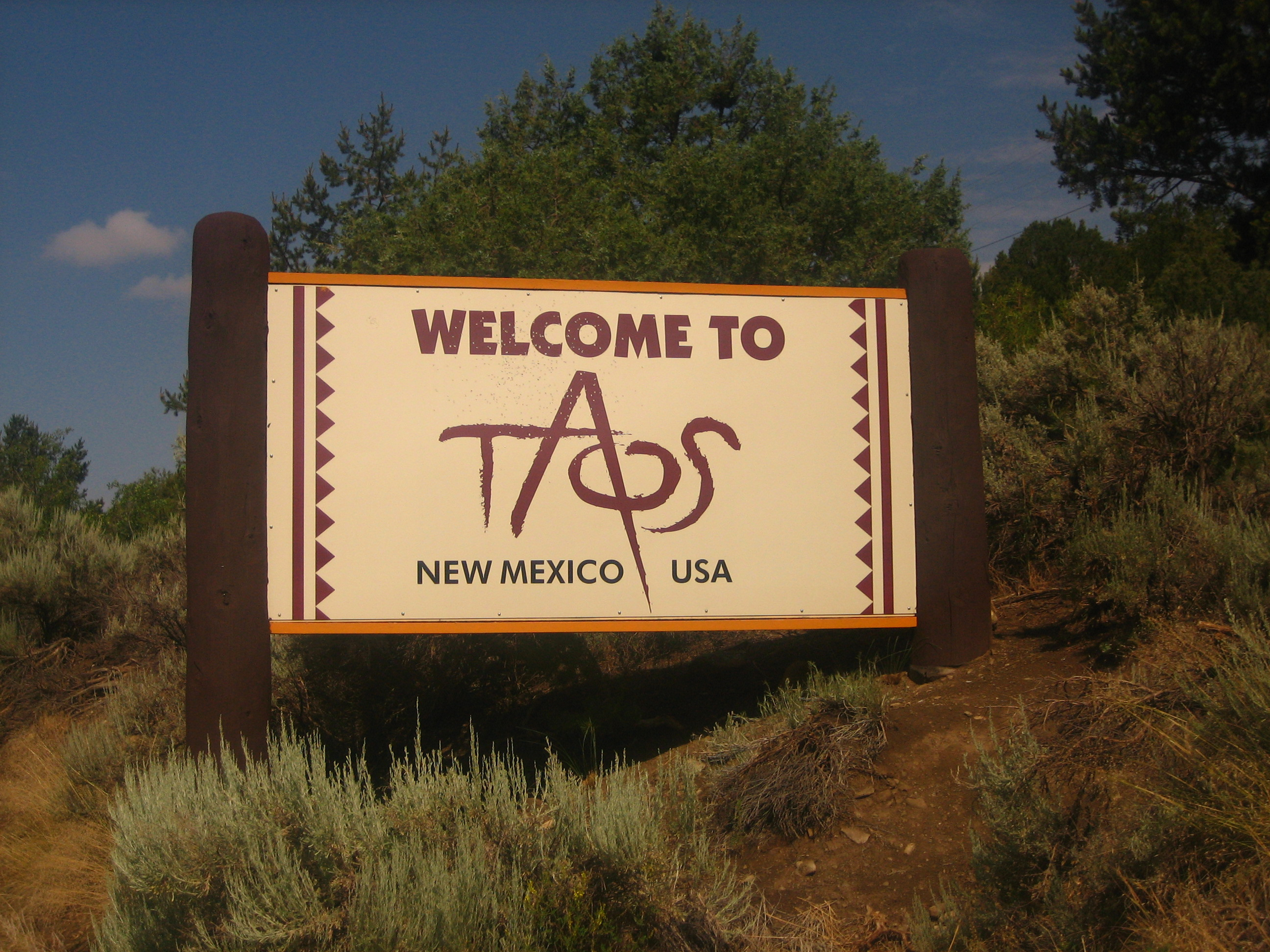
Taos emblem

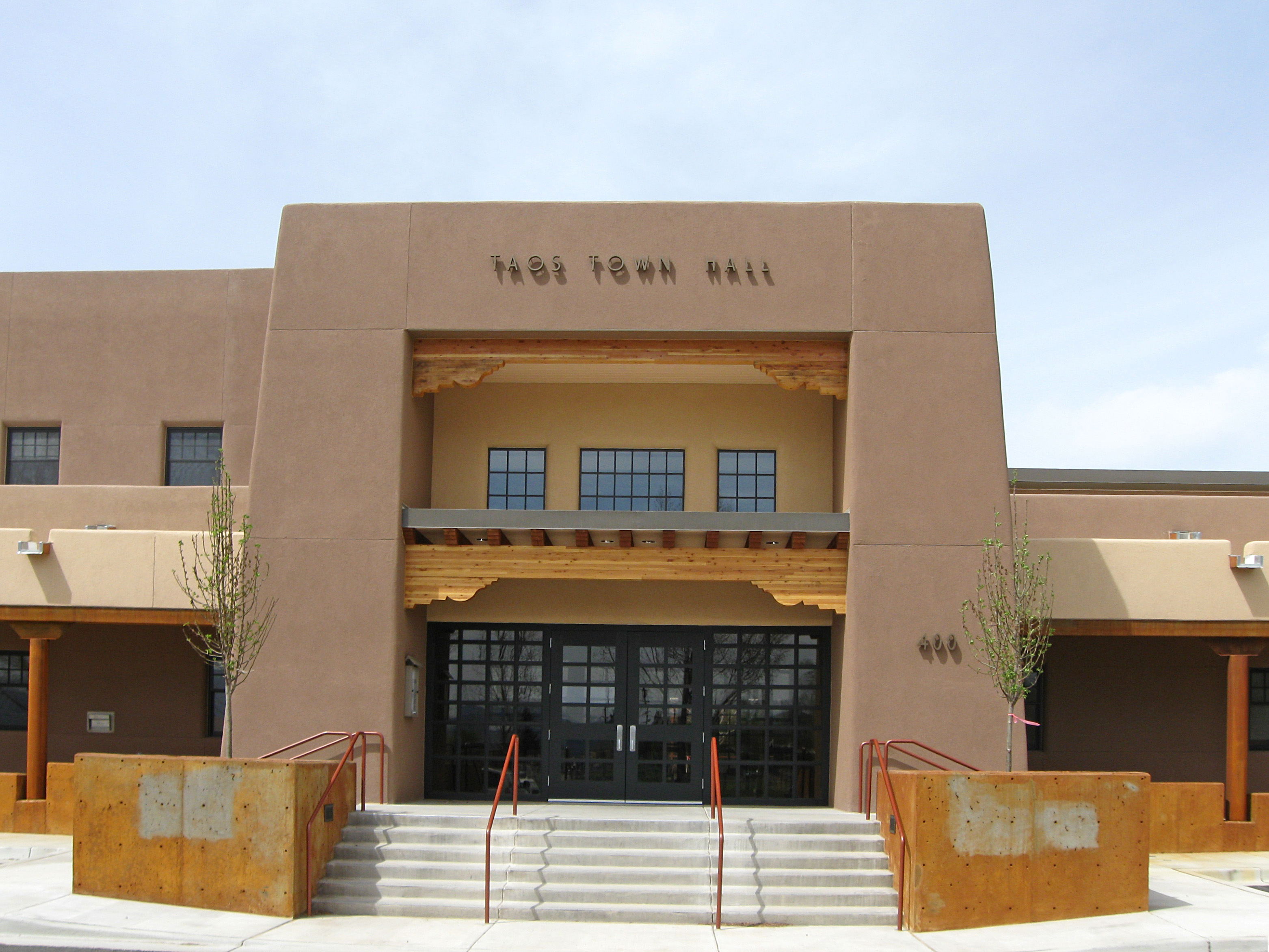
Taos Town Hall

The town of Taos is incorporated under the mayor-council form of government. The town was incorporated on May 7, 1934. The town seal is a logo of the town of Taos with the year of incorporation "1934" in the center, and on the outer edge, the words "Town of Taos, New Mexico".

The elective officers of the town include the mayor, four members of the governing body forming the town council, and a municipal judge. The town council is the board of finance of the town. The town manager and finance director serve as the nonvoting members of the board of finance. Key positions within the town government are town manager, appointed by the mayor, town attorney, town clerk, town engineer and chief of police.

As of April 2022 the town officers were:

- Mayor: Pascual Maestas; term from April 2022 to March 2026
- Town council members: Nathaniel Evans, Marietta Fambro, Darian Fernandez, and Corilia Ortega

Taos is predominantly made up of Democrats; in 2008, approximately 74% of registered Taos County voters were Democrats, 13% were Republicans, and about 13% identified with other parties or declined to affiliate with a party.

== Transportation ==
=== Public ===
The RTD Chile Line, operated by the North Central Regional Transit District (NCRTD), is Taos' only public transportation system. It provides fare-free in-town service as well as seasonal service up to Taos Ski Valley. The transit system also provides paratransit service for citizens with special needs and ensures that all route buses are American Disability Act (ADA) equipped.

The RTD Taos Express promotes local tourism and provides weekend express service, for a nominal fee, from the Taos Plaza to the New Mexico Rail Runner, Santa Fe Municipal Airport, and Santa Fe transit.

The North Central Regional Transit District (NCRTD) has public transportation service into the Town from throughout Taos County and the Counties of Santa Fe, Rio Arriba and Los Alamos. The Taos region has service to Cerro, Penasco, Questa, Red River, the Rio Grande corridor and the University of New Mexico – Taos Klaur campus. At the Española Transit Center, passengers can connect to other regional routes, such as Española, Santa Fe, Los Alamos, and Northern Pueblos area. In 2003 the Regional Transit District Act was enacted, which authorized the creation of Regional Transit Districts (RTD's) in the state of New Mexico; In September 2004, the North Central Regional RTD was the first RTD to be certified by the New Mexico Transportation Commission.

=== Airports ===
Taos Regional Airport (SKX) is under the direct supervision of the Town of Taos. The airport is located just a few miles north of the Town of Taos on U.S. Route 64 towards the Rio Grande Gorge Bridge.

Other airports in New Mexico include the Santa Fe Municipal Airport and Albuquerque International Sunport.

== Media ==
=== Newspapers ===
El Crepusculo de la Libertad was the first Taos newspaper, which began in 1834 with the first printing press west of the Mississippi. Its successor, The Taos News, which also does business as El Crepusculo, is the primary printed newspaper in Taos.

- The Taos News, a weekly online and print publication
- Sangre de Cristo Chronicle (inactive) served Angel Fire, New Mexico, Red River, Cimarron, Eagle Nest, Taos, Las Vegas, Questa and Sipapu.
- The Santa Fe New Mexican
- Albuquerque Journal North Edition

=== Online ===
The Taos News provides weekly online publications of their newspaper.

=== Television ===
There are two local cable television stations: Taos Local Television Public Access Channel 2 and Channel 22. See also List of television stations in New Mexico.

=== Radio ===
Radio stations serving Taos include:

(Several stations are located in the adjacent unincorporated suburbs of El Prado and Arroyo Seco.)

Radio station	Frequency	FM/AM	Format
KCEI	90.1	FM	Variety
KNCE	93.5	FM	"True Taos Radio", variety
KKIT	95.9	FM	"The Mountain", pop, rock, classic rock
KKTC	99.9	FM	"True Country"
KLNN	103.7	FM	Adult contemporary
KRRT	90.9	FM	Top-40, local transmitter for the University of New Mexico's KUNM
KTAO	101.9	FM	Solar radio station with an adult album alternative music format
KVOT	1340	AM	Religious (Christian)
KXMT	99.1	FM	Radio Exitos is the local 24-hour Spanish radio station serving Taos, northern New Mexico and Southern Colorado.
KYBR	92.9	FM	Spanish. Located in Española, but serves Santa Fe and Taos as well.

== In popular culture ==
Taos was featured in The Nine Lives of Elfego Baca (1960) and And Now Miguel (1966).

"Taos, New Mexico" is a song recorded by Waylon Jennings for his 1967 album Love of the Common People.

A different song, also called "Taos, New Mexico", was a chart hit for Canadian singer/songwriter R. Dean Taylor in 1972. The song charted in Canada, Australia, the Netherlands, and the US, reaching top 40 on the US Adult Contemporary charts.

The character Deputy Marshal Sam McCloud in the 1977 television series McCloud, played by Dennis Weaver, is from Taos.

In his 1983 novel Christine, writer Stephen King states that Leigh Cabot eventually settled in Taos with her husband and twin daughters.

A "businessman from Taos" is referenced in the 2022 Charley Crockett song "Tom Turkey".

On September 18, 1991, the PBS television series Reading Rainbow shot its 73rd episode "The Legend of the Indian Paintbrush" here. The title was based on a book by Tomie dePaola and was narrated by Harold Littlebird (born 1951). Santa Fe's Dominic C. Arquero introduced himself at this program's beginning.

The Volkswagen Taos, introduced in October 2018, is named after the town to pay tribute to its former resident John Muir, a structural engineer who authored a Volkswagen repair book in 1969.

In Young Justice, Taos is the location of the Metahuman Youth Center, a community center established to assist victims of metahuman trafficking.

=== Taos Hum ===
An ongoing low-frequency noise, audible only to some, is thought to originate somewhere near this town and is consequently sometimes known as the Taos Hum. Those who have heard the Hum usually hear it west of Taos near Tres Orejas. The Taos Hum was featured in a 1995 episode of the television series Unsolved Mysteries, was mentioned in a 1998 episode of The X-Files, and was featured in a 2018 episode of Criminal Minds.

== Sister cities ==
Taos has one sister city, as designated by Sister Cities International:

- Xalisco, Nayarit, Mexico

== Notable people ==
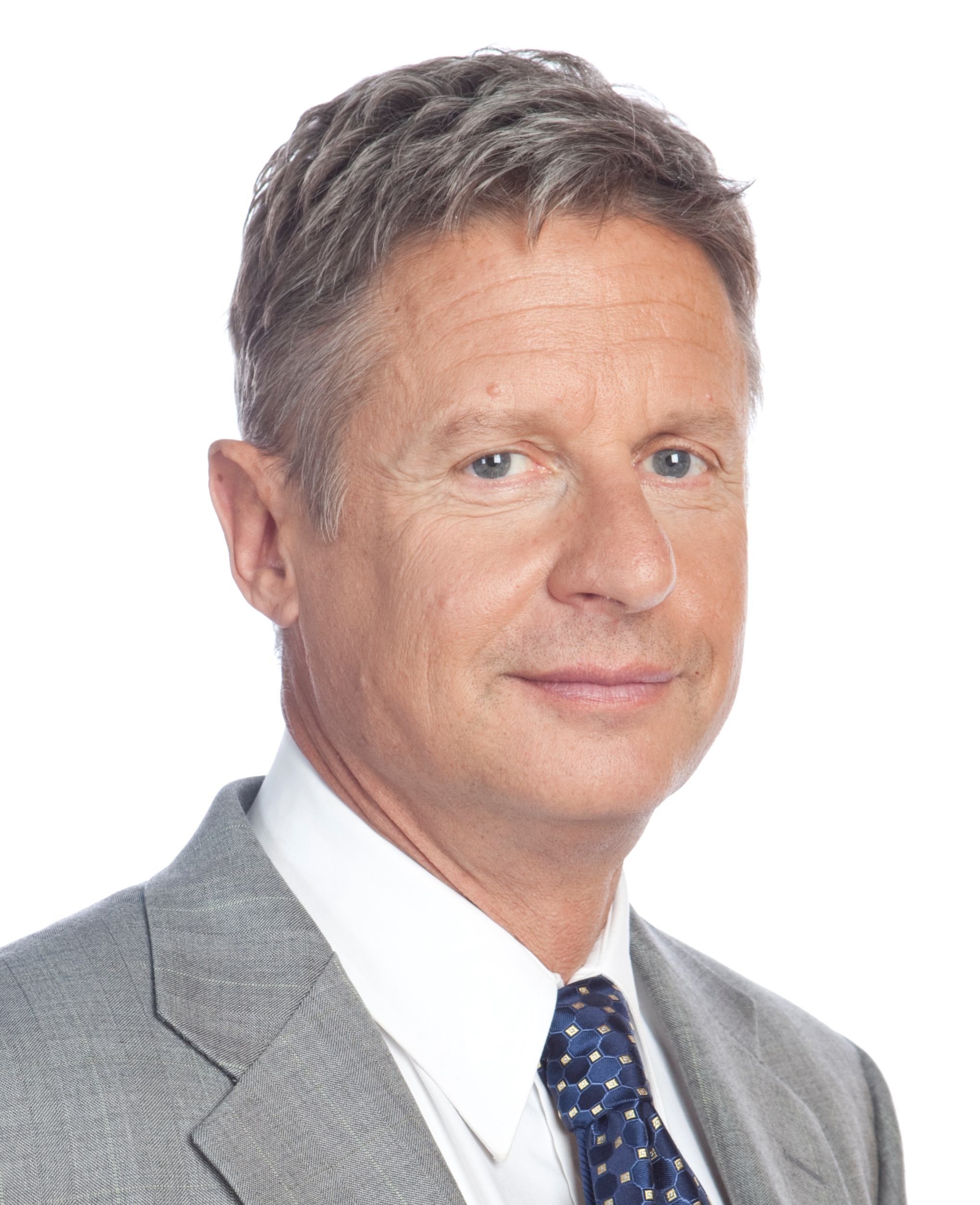
Gary Johnson, former two-term governor of New Mexico

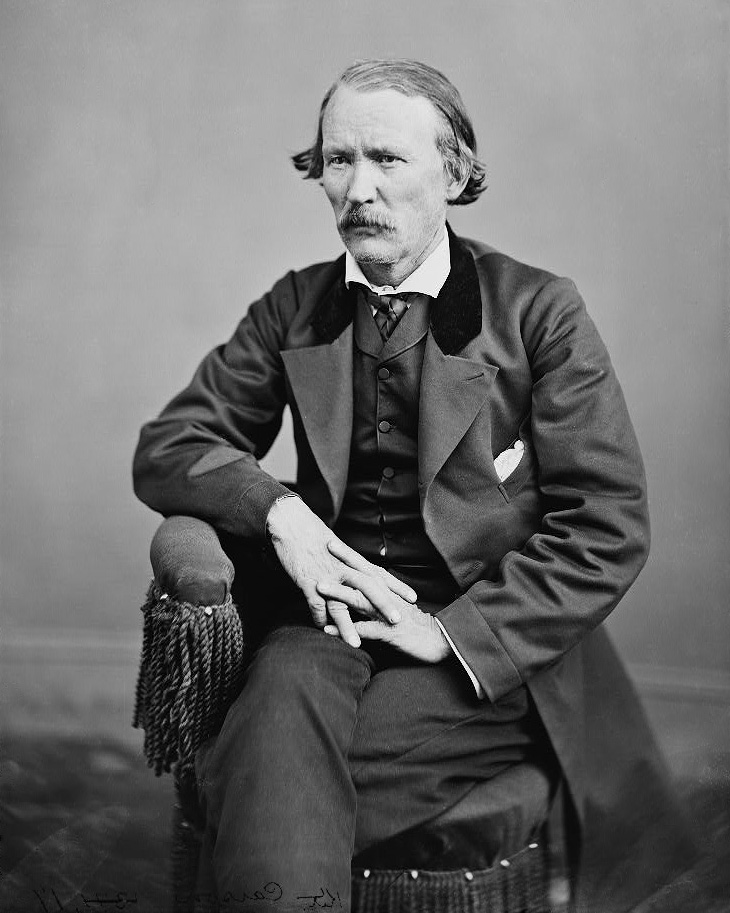
Kit Carson, explorer and frontiersman

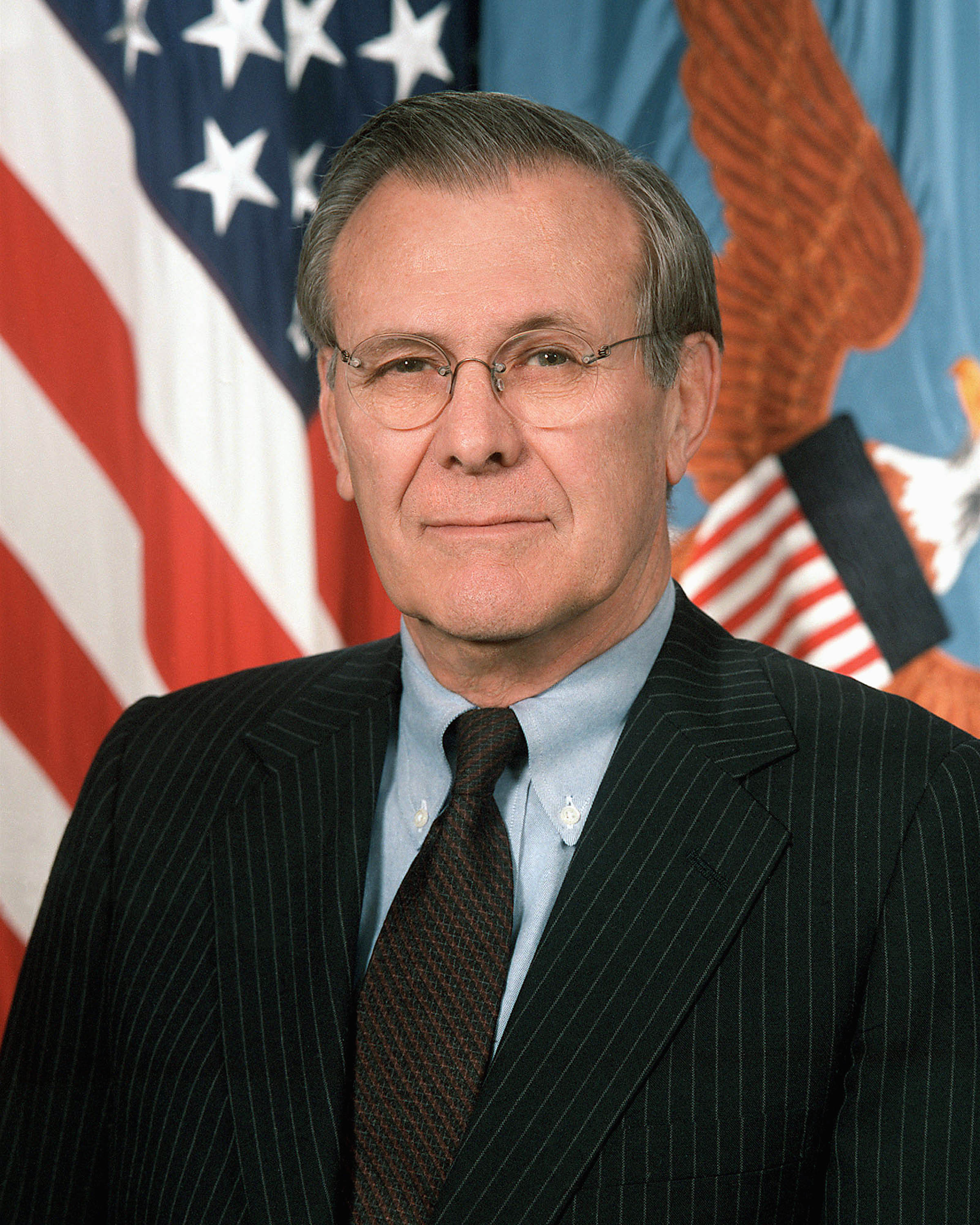
Donald Rumsfeld, 13th and 21st United States secretary of defense and 6th White House chief of staff

=== Artists and actors ===
- Lynn Anderson, country/pop singer
- Chiara Aurelia, actress
- Larry Bell, sculptor
- Oscar E. Berninghaus, artist
- Emil Bisttram, artist
- Ernest L. Blumenschein, founding member, Taos Society of Artists
- Dorothy Brett, artist and personality
- Joshua Bryant, actor, director, author and speaker former longtime resident and founder of the Taos Talking Pictures Film Festival & Media Forum
- Agnes Chavez, artist
- John Cheetham, composer
- Abbie Conant, trombonist and professor
- E. Irving Couse, artist
- Andrew Dasburg, artist
- Ronald Davis, artist
- W. Herbert Dunton, artist
- Nicolai Fechin, artist
- Eliza Gilkyson, folk musician
- R. C. Gorman, artist
- E. Martin Hennings, artist
- William Victor Higgins, artist
- Dennis Hopper, actor, director, artist
- Gene Kloss, artist
- Agnes Martin, artist
- Robert Mirabal, Native American flute player and maker from Taos Pueblo
- Bror Julius Olsson Nordfeldt, artist
- Bert Geer Phillips, artist
- Suzan Pitt, artist, director
- Kenneth Price, ceramicist
- Christian Ristow, artist
- Julia Roberts, actress
- Julius Rolshoven, artist
- Joseph Henry Sharp, artist
- Dean Stockwell, artist and actor
- Walter Ufer, artist
- Kristen Vigard, actress and singer
- Harold Joe Waldrum, artist
- Michael Walker, custom knife maker and sculptor

=== Sportspeople ===
- Ross Anderson, skier
- Kit Carson, frontiersman
- Chris Del Conte, athletic director of the University of Texas at Austin
- Dave Hahn, mountaineer
- Danelle Umstead, Paralympic skier

=== Professors and medical professionals ===
- Thomas "Doc" Martin, physician
- Fred Wendorf, Henderson-Morrison Professor of Anthropology at Southern Methodist University

=== Authors, poets, and teachers ===
- Julia Cameron, author of The Artist's Way
- Judson Crews, poet and publisher
- James Doss, author
- Natalie Goldberg, writer
- Marilyn Gayle Hoff, author and activist
- Margaret Catherine Alice Hyson, missionary and teacher in Ranchos de Taos, New Mexico
- D. H. Lawrence, author
- Anne MacNaughton, poet and cofounder of Taos Poetry Circus
- John Muir, engineer, mechanic and writer
- John Nichols, author of The Milagro Beanfield War
- Olivia Romo, poet, spoken word artist and water rights activist
- Elizabeth Shepley Sergeant, journalist and writer

=== Businesspeople and architects ===
- Marcelino Baca, 19th-century fur trader
- Mabel Dodge Luhan, patron of the arts
- Susan Powter, health and fitness entrepreneur
- Mike Reynolds, Earthship architect
- Millicent Rogers, socialite, fashion icon, and art collector
- Maria Rosa Villalpando (1738–1830), Hispanic woman who became a captive of the Comanche and later a businesswoman in St. Louis

=== Politicians and military ===
- Daniel R. Barrone, Mayor of Taos and member of the New Mexico House of Representatives
- Charles Bent, first territorial governor of New Mexico
- Gary Johnson, former two-term governor of New Mexico
- John Márquez, politician in Richmond, California
- Joe P. Martínez, Medal of Honor recipient
- Kristina Ortez, politician
- Donald Rumsfeld, 13th and 21st United States Secretary of Defense, 6th White House Chief of Staff, and four-term member of the United States House of Representatives for Illinois's 13th congressional district (1963–1969)
- Rebecca Vigil-Giron, 20th and 22nd Secretary of State of New Mexico

=== Religious figures ===
- Antonio José Martínez, priest

== Gallery ==
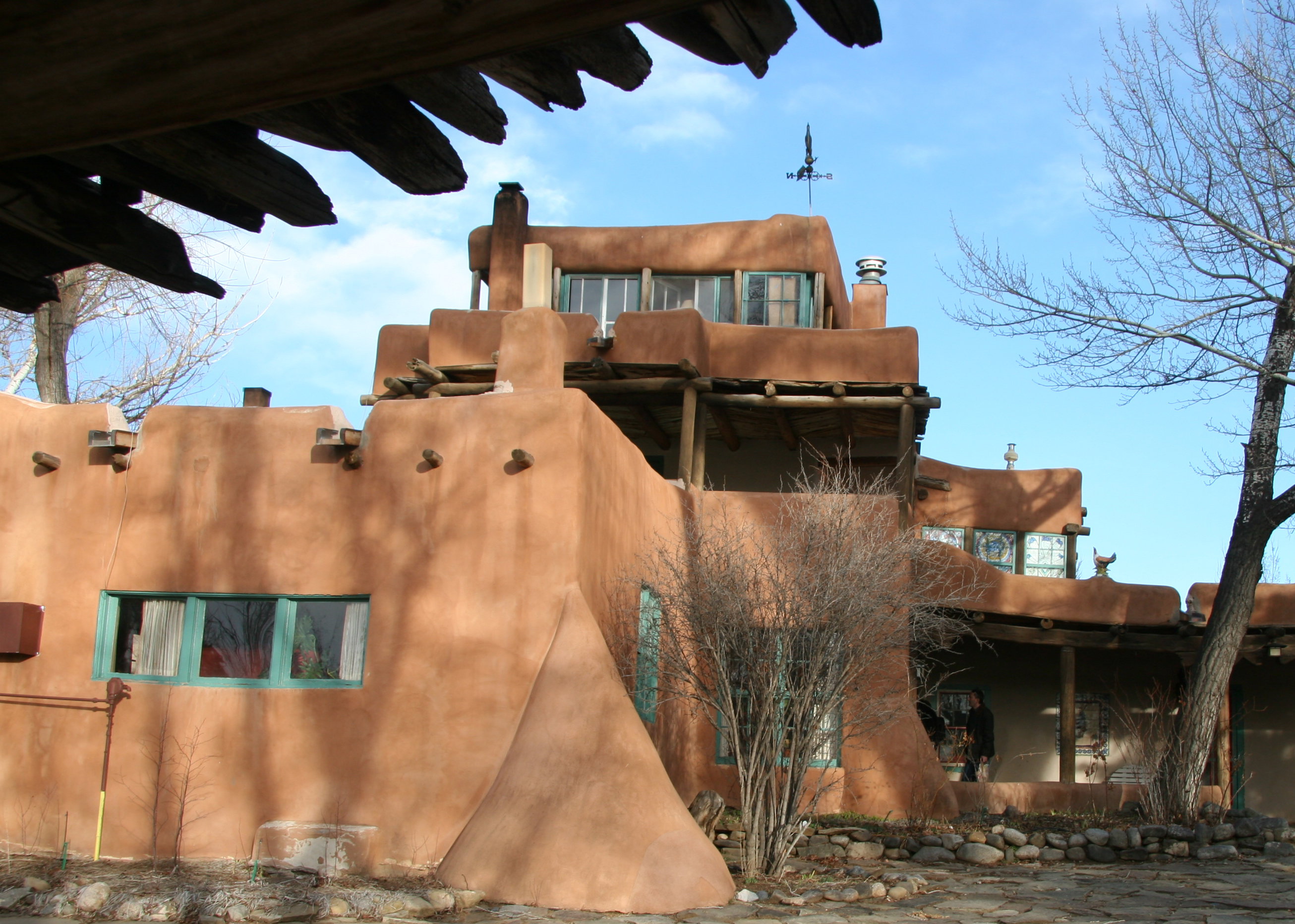
Mabel Dodge Luhan House, a National Historic Landmark

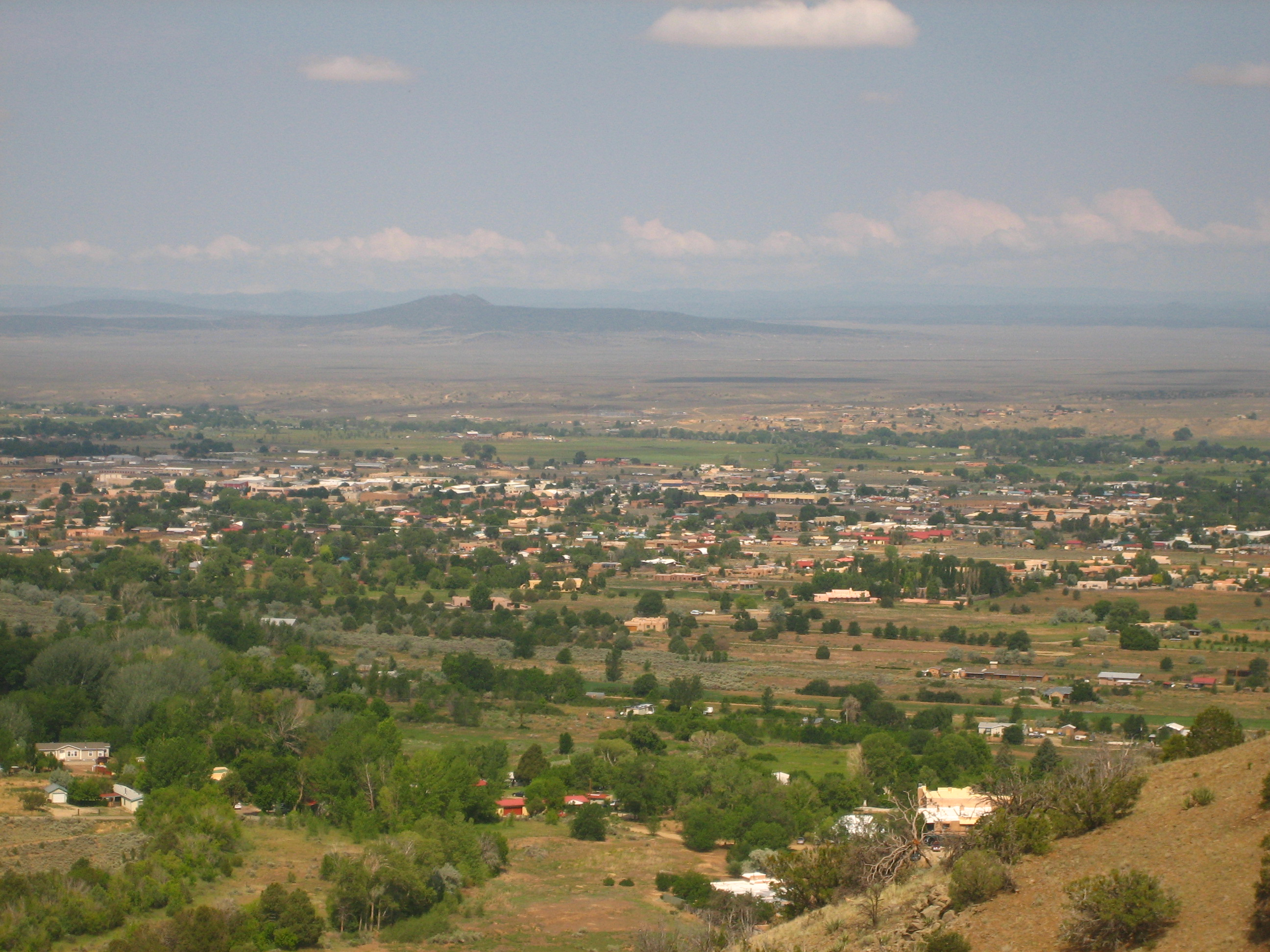
View of Taos from mountain trail

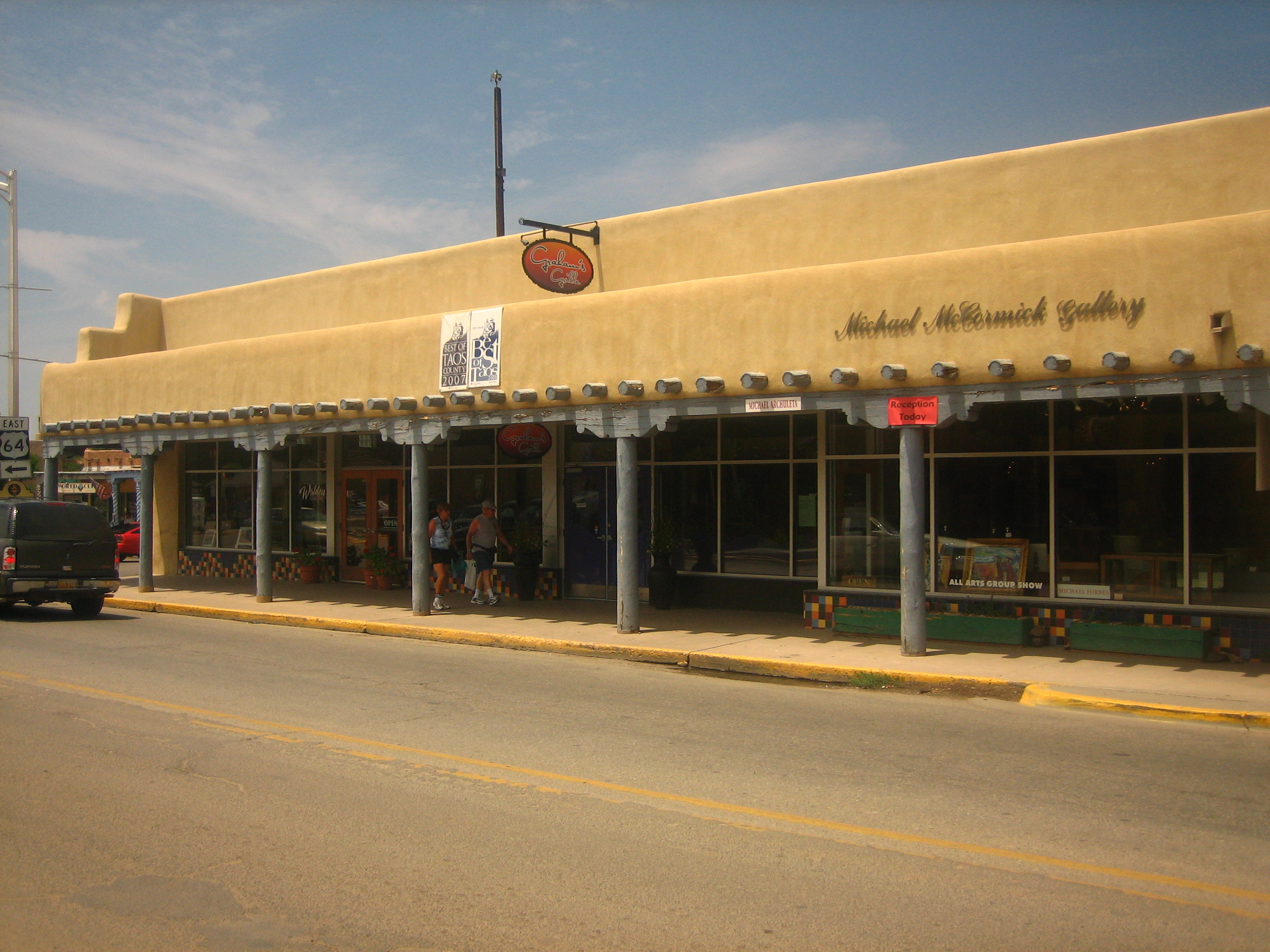
Downtown Paseo Del Pueblo Norte in Taos

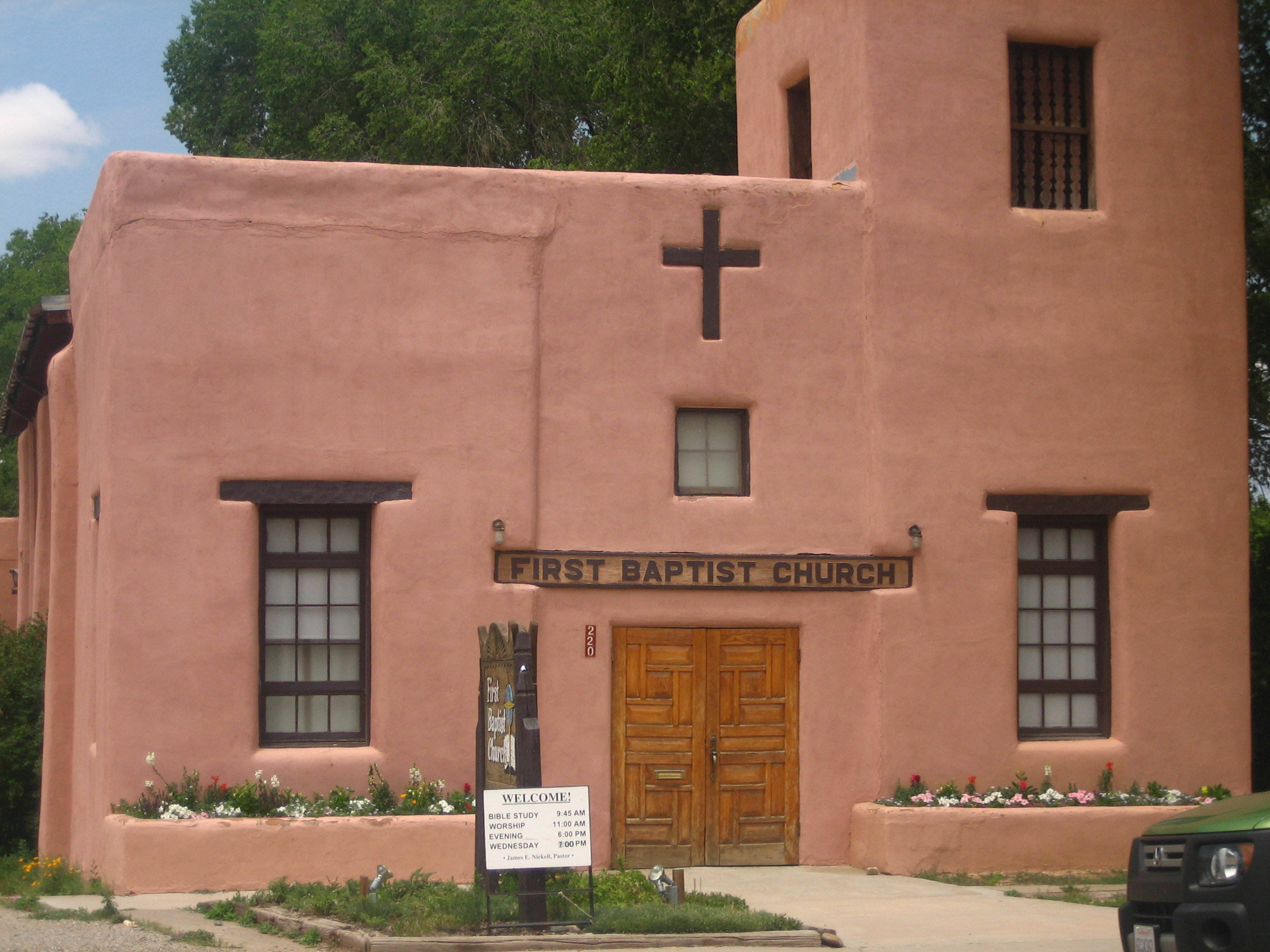
Spanish Revival-style First Baptist Church

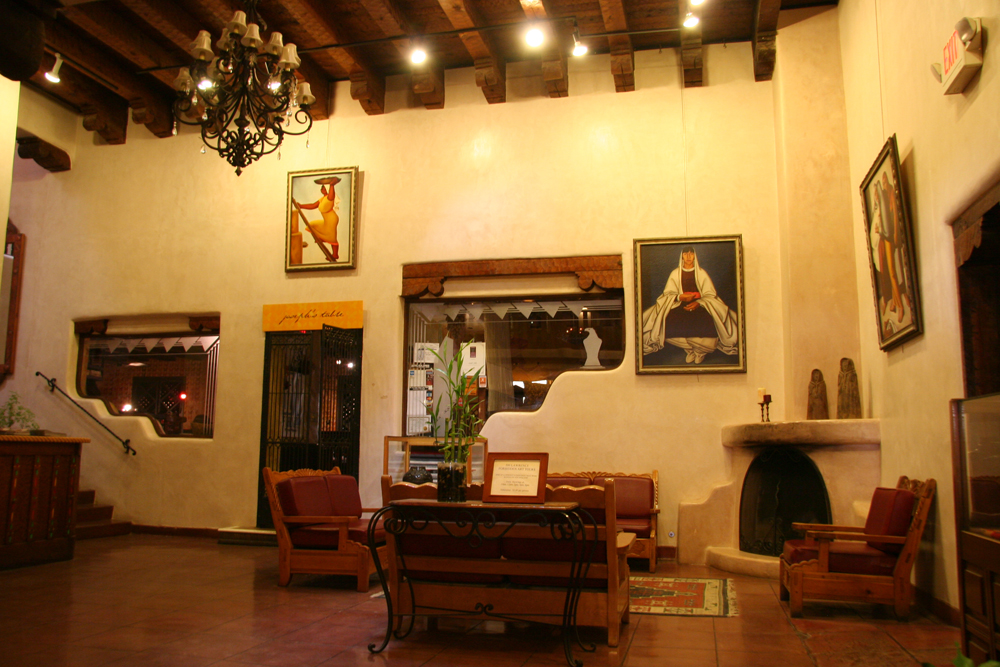
Lobby of the La Fonda hotel

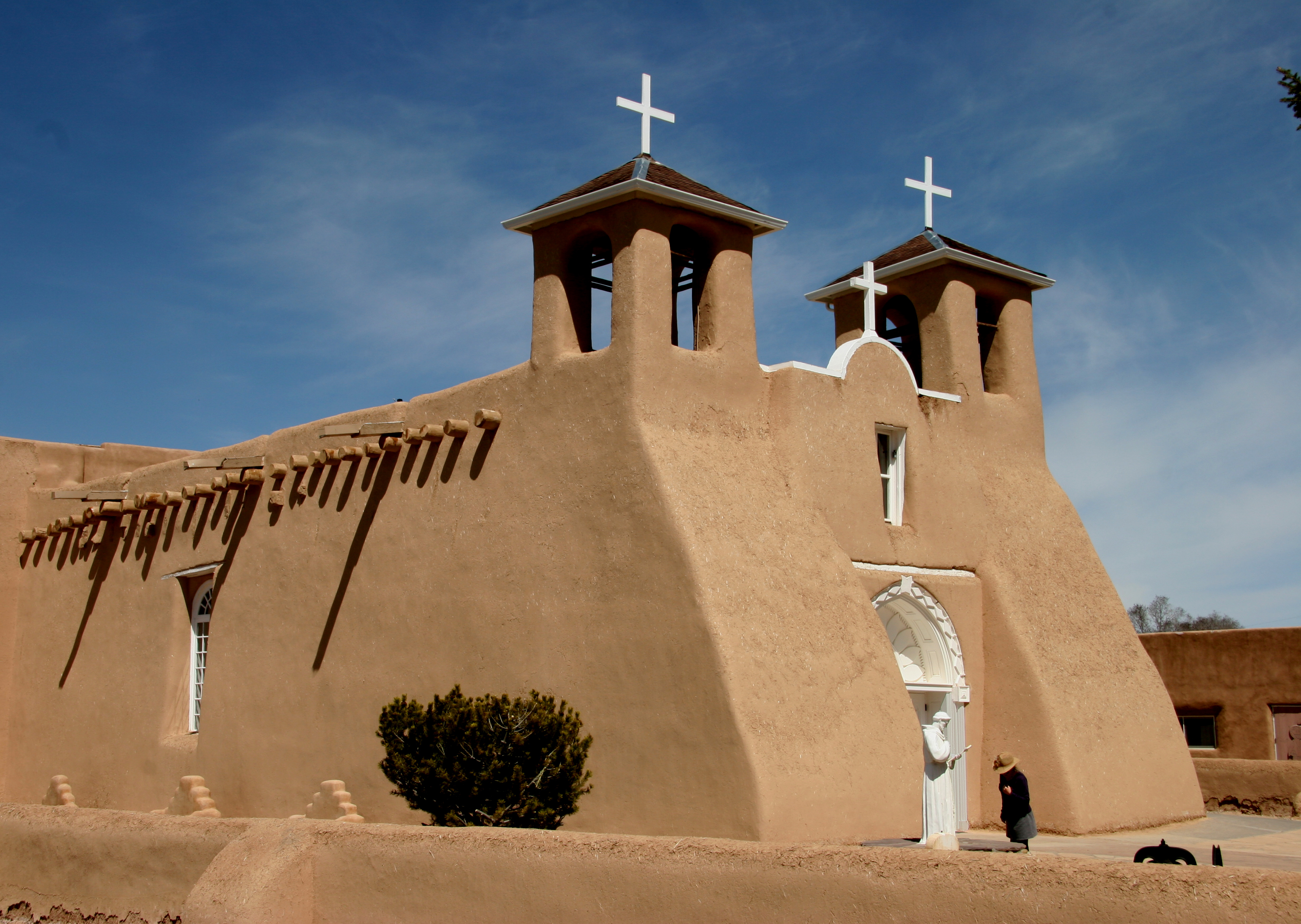
San Francisco de Asis Church at Ranchos de Taos

== See also ==
- List of municipalities in New Mexico
