= Daniel R. Barrone =

American politician

Daniel Barrone

Member of the New Mexico House of Representatives from the 42nd district
- In office January 4, 2020 – January 21, 2021
- Preceded by: Roberto Gonzales
- Succeeded by: Kristina Ortez

Mayor of Taos, New Mexico
- In office March 2018 – March 2022
- Succeeded by: Pascualito M. Maestas

Personal details
- Party: Democratic
- Education: New Mexico State University (BA)

Daniel R. Barrone is an American politician who served as the mayor of Taos, New Mexico, from 2018 to 2022 and as a member of the New Mexico House of Representatives from 2020 to 2021.

== Early life and education ==
Barrone earned a Bachelor of Arts degree in business from the New Mexico State University.

== Career ==
Barrone has worked for many years at Olguin's Sawmill, a full-service mill located in El Prado, New Mexico. In 2006, he was elected to serve as a member of the Taos County Commission before his election in March 2018 as mayor of Taos. In 2020, after incumbent representative Roberto Gonzales was nominated to serve in the New Mexico Senate, the Taos County Commission voted to appoint Barrone to his vacant seat in the House. He took office on January 4, 2020. On April 17, 2020, Barrone announced that he would not seek a full term in the House in the 2020 election, citing his concern about the COVID-19 pandemic and its effect on Taos.
