= Marcelino Baca =

Mexican fur trader

Marcelino Baca (c. 1808 – 21 February 1862) was a 19th-century Mexican fur trader who helped to establish the fur trade in the American Southwest.

== Early life ==
Baca was born in Taos, New Mexico to Mexican parents, a background which he allegedly despised.

== Trapper career ==
Baca spent around 9 years trapping on the Upper Missouri. By 1835, he was trapping with Jim Bridger in the Rocky Mountains. In February 1837, Baca was shot in the heel by a Blackfoot while protecting a trappers fort, but survived the incident.

== Post–trapping ==
After the decline of beaver trapping in the middle of the century, Baca settled down with his family near El Pueblo and began cattle ranching. His ranch was the victim of various raids and attacks from local tribes, including the Utes and Apaches.

Baca was hired as a guide to accompany Edward Griffin Beckwith to Fort Massachusetts.

== Family life ==
Around 1838, Baca entered Pawnee lands near the Platte River and was taken captive. Before he could be killed, the chief's daughter begged her father to spare Baca's life, and he was released. He took the chief's daughter as his wife and gave her his mother's name, Tomasa.

In 1839, Tomasa gave birth to their first son, José, on the South Platte. In 1841, she gave birth to their second son, Luis, at Fort Laramie. In 1846, she gave birth to their daughter, Elena, at Hardscrabble, Colorado. Elena would go on to marry Mariano, the son of fellow trapper Charles Autobees.

== Death ==
Baca joined the 1st Regiment New Mexico Volunteer Cavalry during the American Civil War. He was killed during the Battle of Valverde on 21 February 1862.
