= Thomas "Doc" Martin =

American physician

Thomas Paul "Doc" Martin (October 30, 1864 – 1935) was an American physician. He was one of the first American residents of Taos County, New Mexico and the first practicing physician in Taos.

== Early life and education ==
Thomas Paul Martin was born in Shippensburg, Pennsylvania on October 30, 1864. His parents, Joab and Louie O. (Hostetter) Martin, were Pennsylvania natives. His father was a grain merchant.

Martin attended the College of Physicians and Surgeons in Baltimore, Maryland, earning his M.D. in 1887. He interned at Baltimore City Hospital and Mercy Hospital in Pittsburgh, Pennsylvania.

== Taos, New Mexico ==
Martin moved to Taos, New Mexico in January, 1890, where he opened a medical office and practiced medicine and surgery throughout Taos County. He was an early member of the New Mexico Medical Society. He was physician for the local Pueblos and also for the Penitentes. He served eight years on the Territorial Board of Health and was a United States examining physician.

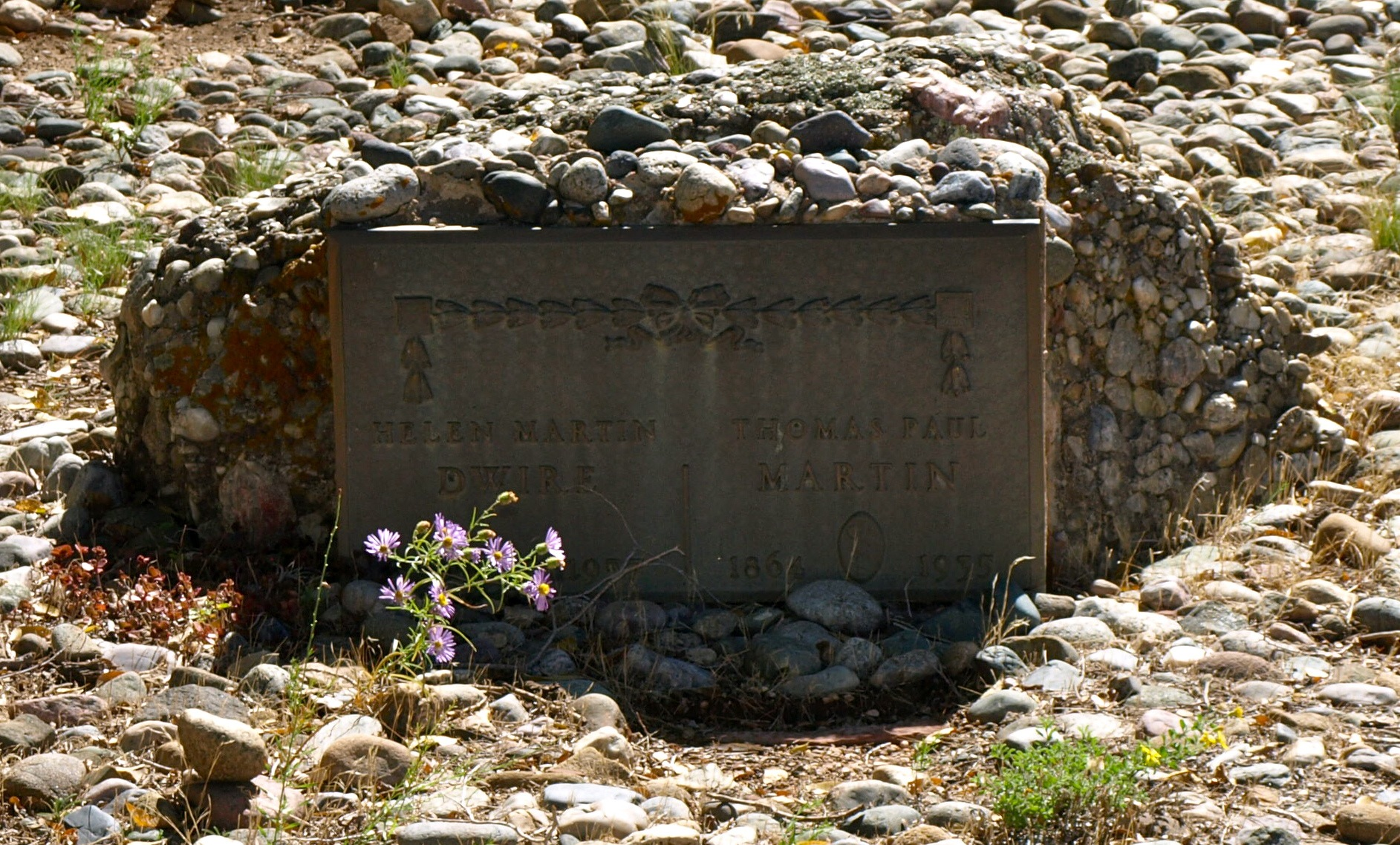
Doc Martin's marker at Sierra Vista Cemetery in Taos.

Doc Martin was a major figure in the development of Taos. Blanche Grant wrote of him a year before his death, "(He) Has been prominent in all important matters pertaining to Taos ever since (he arrived in 1889)." He was a Freemason and one of the first Shriners in New Mexico. He served as deputy for all Masonic bodies in northern New Mexico. He was also a member of both the Independent Order of Odd Fellows and the Benevolent and Protective Order of Elks. He served as vice-president of the New Mexico chapter of the Sons of the American Revolution.

Martin's sister Rose married Taos artist Bert Geer Phillips in 1899. The initial 1915 meeting of the Taos Society of Artists was held at Doc Martin's home. After Martin's death in 1935, his widow Helen converted the house into Hotel Martin, which opened on June 7, 1936.

Hotel Martin was renamed by subsequent owners, becoming the Taos Inn. The inn's restaurant, named Doc Martin's, is located in Martin's former offices. The inn was added to the New Mexico State Register of Cultural Properties in 1981 and to the National Register of Historic Places in 1982.
