= National Register of Historic Places listings in Taos County, New Mexico =

Location of Taos County in New Mexico

This is a list of the National Register of Historic Places listings in Taos County, New Mexico in the United States of America.

This is intended to be a complete list of the properties and districts on the National Register of Historic Places in Taos County, New Mexico, United States. Latitude and longitude coordinates are provided for many National Register properties and districts; these locations may be seen together in a map.

There are 43 properties and districts listed on the National Register in the county, including seven National Historic Landmarks. All but seven of the National Register listings within the county are also recorded on the New Mexico State Register of Cultural Properties.

This National Park Service list is complete through NPS recent listings posted December 12, 2025.

Contents: NRHP in New Mexico by county
Bernalillo – Catron – Chaves – Cibola – Colfax – Curry – De Baca – Doña Ana – Eddy – Grant – Guadalupe – Harding – Hidalgo – Lea – Lincoln – Los Alamos – Luna – McKinley – Mora – Otero – Quay – Rio Arriba – Roosevelt – San Juan – San Miguel – Sandoval – Santa Fe – Sierra – Socorro – Taos – Torrance – Union – Valencia

== Current listings ==
	Name on the Register	Image	Date listed	Location	City or town	Description
1	Bernard J. Beimer House	Bernard J. Beimer House	March 22, 2006 (#06000156)	215 Beimer Ave. 36°25′00″N 105°34′18″W	Taos	State Register of Cultural Properties (SRCP)
2	Governor Charles Bent House	Governor Charles Bent House	November 16, 1978 (#78001831)	Bent St. 36°24′31″N 105°34′22″W	Taos	SRCP
3	Black Copper Mine and Stamp Mill	Black Copper Mine and Stamp Mill	October 27, 2000 (#00000875)	Black Copper Canyon Rd. 36°38′14″N 105°22′13″W	Red River	SRCP
4	Ernest L. Blumenschein House	Ernest L. Blumenschein House	October 15, 1966 (#66000495)	Ledoux St. 36°24′21″N 105°34′34″W	Taos	
5	Carson School	Carson School	February 13, 1986 (#86000233)	State Road 96; 36°21′53″N 105°45′55″W	Carson	SRCP
6	Kit Carson House	Kit Carson House	October 15, 1966 (#66000948)	Kit Carson Ave. 36°24′25″N 105°34′20″W	Taos	
7	Chapel of Santa Cruz	Chapel of Santa Cruz	April 14, 1975 (#75001174)	Southern side of Plaza off U.S. Route 285; 36°18′11″N 106°02′46″W	Ojo Caliente	SRCP
8	Laureano Cordova Mill	Laureano Cordova Mill	November 5, 1974 (#74001212)	Off State Road 75; 36°11′26″N 105°40′08″W	Vadito	SRCP
9	Eanger Irving Couse House and Studio—Joseph Henry Sharp Studios	Eanger Irving Couse House and Studio—Joseph Henry Sharp Studios	September 28, 2005 (#05001096)	146 Kit Carson Rd. 36°24′29″N 105°34′18″W	Taos	SRCP
10	Nicholai Fechin House	Nicholai Fechin House	December 31, 1979 (#79001558)	227 Paseo del Pueblo Norte; 36°24′37″N 105°34′09″W	Taos	SRCP; Now the Taos Art Museum
11	Leon Gaspard House	Leon Gaspard House	February 23, 1979 (#79001559)	Raton Rd / Kit Carson Rd. 36°23′45″N 105°33′54″W	Taos	SRCP
12	Harwood Foundation	Harwood Foundation	December 22, 1976 (#76001200)	LeDoux St. 36°24′20″N 105°34′36″W	Taos	SRCP; now the Harwood Museum of Art
13	E. Martin Hennings House and Studio Historic District	E. Martin Hennings House and Studio Historic District	July 5, 1990 (#90001028)	Southeastern corner of the junction of Dolan St. and Kit Carson Rd. 36°24′01″N 105°34′03″W	Taos	SRCP
14	Howiri-ouinge		April 7, 1983 (#83001633)	Intersection of U.S. Route 285 and State Road 96; 36°18′11″N 106°02′48″W	Ojo Caliente	SRCP
15	La Loma Plaza Historic District	La Loma Plaza Historic District	July 8, 1982 (#82003339)	State Road 240; 36°24′23″N 105°34′50″W	Taos	SRCP; Aerial photo-map
16	La Morada de Nuestra Senora de Guadalupe	La Morada de Nuestra Senora de Guadalupe	June 29, 1976 (#76001201)	Penitente Road; 36°24′23″N 105°33′47″W	Taos	SRCP
17	Las Trampas Historic District	Las Trampas Historic District	May 28, 1967 (#67000007)	On State Road 76; 36°07′57″N 105°45′48″W	Las Trampas	
18	D.H. Lawrence Ranch Historic District	D.H. Lawrence Ranch Historic District	January 15, 2004 (#03001410)	Lawrence Rd., approximately 2.75 miles east of State Road 522 on U.S. Forest Service Rd. 7; 36°34′55″N 105°35′37″W	San Cristobal	SRCP
19	Mabel Dodge Luhan House	Mabel Dodge Luhan House	November 15, 1978 (#78001832)	Luhan Lane; 36°24′29″N 105°33′52″W	Taos	SRCP
20	Orin Mallette Cabin	Orin Mallette Cabin	February 23, 1984 (#84003055)	West of Red River; 36°42′28″N 105°25′34″W	Red River	SRCP
21	Sylvester M. Mallette Cabin	Sylvester M. Mallette Cabin	February 23, 1984 (#84003056)	River St. and Copper King; 36°42′20″N 105°24′13″W	Red River	SRCP
22	Severino Martinez House	Severino Martinez House	April 23, 1973 (#73001153)	2 miles from Taos Plaza, on the Lower Ranchitos Rd. 36°24′04″N 105°36′29″W	Taos	SRCP; Hacienda de los Martinez -- Bird's-eye view
23	Melson-Oldham Cabin	Melson-Oldham Cabin	February 23, 1984 (#84003057)	Southeast of Red River; 36°41′18″N 105°23′13″W	Red River	SRCP
24	Molino de los Duranes		February 3, 2020 (#100004918)	83 Camino Abajo de la Loma; 36°20′58″N 105°36′10″W	Rancho de Taos vicinity	
25	Ojo Caliente Hot Springs Round Barn	Ojo Caliente Hot Springs Round Barn	October 6, 2003 (#03000996)	500 yards north of the western terminus of State Road 414; 36°18′37″N 106°02′48″W	Ojo Caliente	SRCP
26	Ojo Caliente Mineral Springs	Ojo Caliente Mineral Springs	November 17, 1985 (#85003496)	State Road 414; 36°18′17″N 106°03′06″W	Ojo Caliente	SRCP
27	Peñasco High School		January 26, 2023 (#100008588)	15086 NM 75; 36°10′12″N 105°41′12″W	Peñasco	
28	Picuris Pueblo	Picuris Pueblo	August 13, 1974 (#74001211)	South of Taos; 36°12′05″N 105°42′32″W	Taos	SRCP
29	Pierce-Fuller House	Pierce-Fuller House	February 23, 1984 (#84003058)	High St. 36°42′42″N 105°24′37″W	Red River	SRCP
30	Posi-ouinge	Posi-ouinge	August 5, 1993 (#93000675)	Access to the trail is behind the Ojo Caliente Mineral Springs Resort at 50 Los Banos Drive in Ojo Caliente; 36°18′19″N 106°03′06″W	Ojo Caliente	Extends into Rio Arriba County. BLM public access info.
31	Ranchos de Taos Plaza	Ranchos de Taos Plaza	October 2, 1978 (#78001830)	Off U.S. Route 64; 36°21′30″N 105°36′28″W	Ranchos de Taos	SRCP
32	Red River Schoolhouse	Red River Schoolhouse	February 23, 1984 (#84003059)	High St. 36°42′23″N 105°24′00″W	Red River	SRCP
33	Rio Grande Gorge Bridge	Rio Grande Gorge Bridge	July 15, 1997 (#97000733)	State Road 111 over the Rio Grande Gorge; 36°28′34″N 105°43′56″W	Taos	SRCP
34	San Francisco de Assisi Mission Church	San Francisco de Assisi Mission Church	April 15, 1970 (#70000416)	The Plaza; 36°21′31″N 105°36′28″W	Ranchos de Taos	
35	San José de Gracia Church	San José de Gracia Church	April 15, 1970 (#70000415)	Northern side of the Plaza; 36°07′53″N 105°45′28″W	Las Trampas	
36	San Ysidro Oratorio		January 5, 1984 (#84003060)	State Road 240; 36°23′12″N 105°37′41″W	Los Cordovas	SRCP
37	Taos Downtown Historic District	Taos Downtown Historic District	July 8, 1982 (#82003340)	State Roads 3 and 240; 36°24′24″N 105°34′23″W	Taos	SRCP
38	Taos Inn	Taos Inn	February 5, 1982 (#82003341)	Pueblo del Norte; 36°24′28″N 105°34′20″W	Taos	SRCP
39	Taos Pueblo	Taos Pueblo	October 15, 1966 (#66000496)	3 miles north of Taos; 36°28′19″N 105°33′35″W	Taos	SRCP
40	Tres Piedras Administrative Site	Tres Piedras Administrative Site	August 5, 1993 (#92000341)	West of U.S. Route 285, north of Tres Piedras; 36°39′13″N 105°58′10″W	Tres Piedras	
41	Tres Piedras Railroad Water Tower	Tres Piedras Railroad Water Tower	February 2, 1979 (#79001560)	Off U.S. Route 285; 36°38′51″N 105°57′55″W	Tres Piedras	SRCP
42	Turley Mill and Distillery Site		November 16, 1978 (#78001833)	11 miles (17.6 km) north of Taos; 36°32′23″N 105°37′19″W	Taos	SRCP
43	Brigham J. Young House	Brigham J. Young House	February 23, 1984 (#84003063)	Main St. 36°42′23″N 105°24′00″W	Red River	SRCP

== See also ==
- List of National Historic Landmarks in New Mexico
- National Register of Historic Places listings in New Mexico
