= Howiri =

- Howiri-ouinge
- U.S. National Register of Historic Places
- Nearest city: Ojo Caliente, New Mexico
- Area: 25 acres (10 ha)
- NRHP reference No.: 83001633
- Added to NRHP: April 7, 1983

Howiri (Tewa: Howíḏí Ówîngeh Kayyee, "gray point ruin") is a Tewa Pueblo ancestral site in Taos County, New Mexico, United States. Its ten circular kivas are located on the east bank of Rio Ojo Caliente, near Homayo. It was occupied from around 1400 until around 1525. In 1983, it was listed on the National Register of Historic Places listings in Taos County, New Mexico.

Coordinates: 36.3232°N 106.0331°W
