= Ojo Caliente =

Ojo Caliente may mean:

== Populated places ==
- Ojo Caliente, New Mexico, a community in Taos County, New Mexico
- Ojocaliente, Zacatecas, a medium-sized town in Mexico

== Other ==
- Ojo Caliente (Socorro County, New Mexico), a spring in the Monticello Canyon
- Ojo Caliente Hot Springs, a hot spring system in New Mexico
