= Ojo Caliente Hot Springs Round Barn =

- U.S. National Register of Historic Places
- NM State Register of Cultural Properties
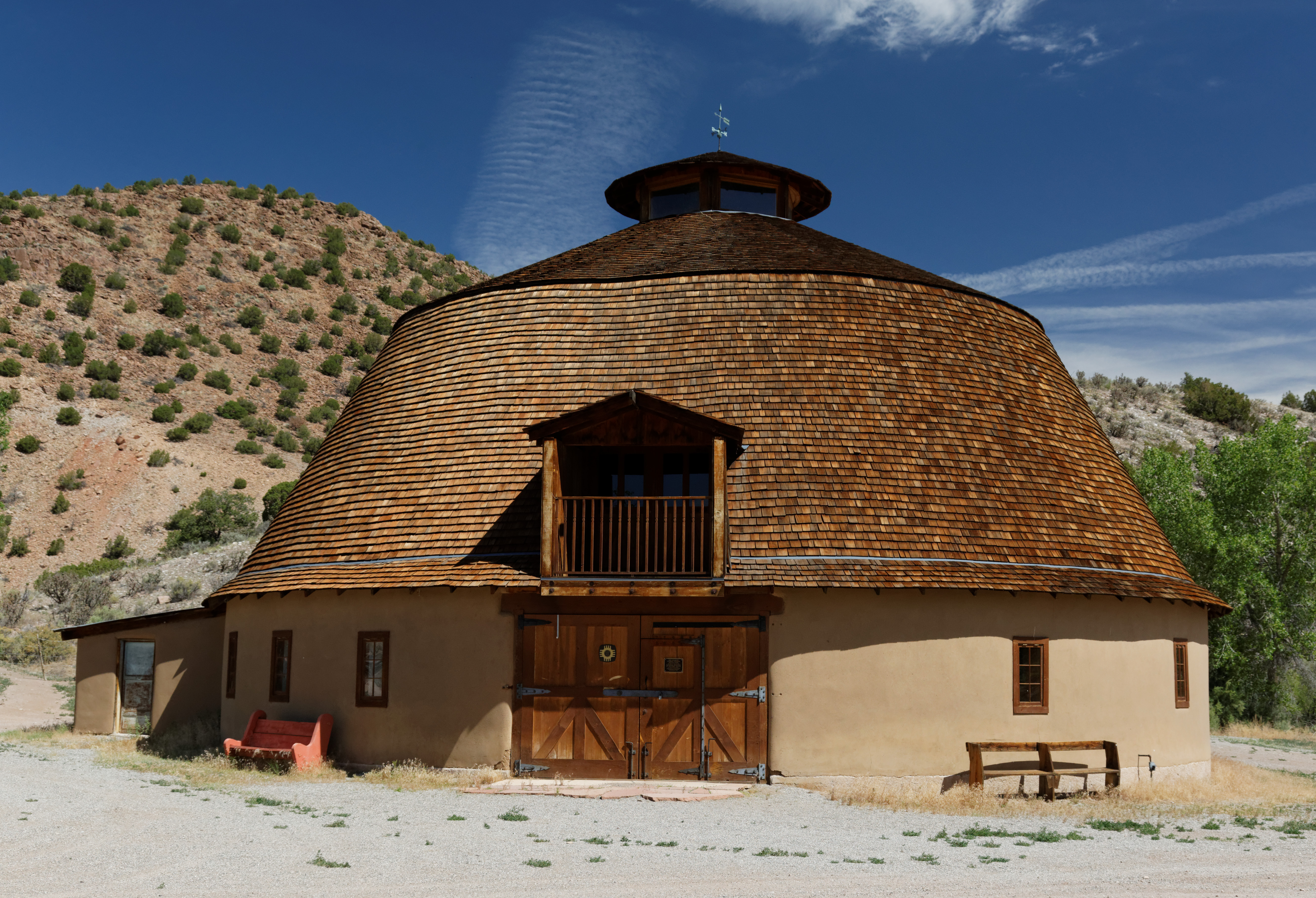
- Ojo Caliente Hot Springs Round Barn

- Location within New Mexico
- Location: 500 yds N of the western terminus of NM 414, Ojo Caliente, New Mexico
- Coordinates: 36°18′37″N 106°2′48″W
- Area: less than one acre
- Built: 1924
- Architectural style: Round barn
- NRHP reference No.: 03000996
- NMSRCP No.: 503

Significant dates
- Added to NRHP: October 6, 2003
- Designated NMSRCP: May 7, 1977

The Ojo Caliente Hot Springs Round Barn is in Ojo Caliente, New Mexico and was built in 1924. It is the only adobe round barn in the United States.

== History ==
The two-story round barn is a 65 feet (20 m) tall with adobe walls on a concrete foundation, and has a double pitch, domed roof topped by a hexagonal cupola. The barn was built by Anthony F. Joseph, the owner and manager of the Ojo Caliente Hot Springs. By the mid-1910s, the mineral resort experienced growth and increased popularity and the barn was needed to meet a growing need for dairy products at the mineral resort. The ability to provide dairy products signifies a move towards commercial production from subsistence home production. By providing dairy products to guests, the resort was able to provide convenience and reassurance.

The hay hood dormer over the barn door was added by later owners, when the original opening there, flush with the domed roof shape, proved too exposed.

It was restored in 2002, and listed on the National Register of Historic Places in 2003. At the time of its NRHP listing, it was believed to be the only round barn in New Mexico. It is within sight of U.S. Route 285.

== See also ==
- National Register of Historic Places listings in Taos County, New Mexico
