= Leon Gaspard House =

Historic house in New Mexico, United States

- U.S. National Register of Historic Places
- NM State Register of Cultural Properties
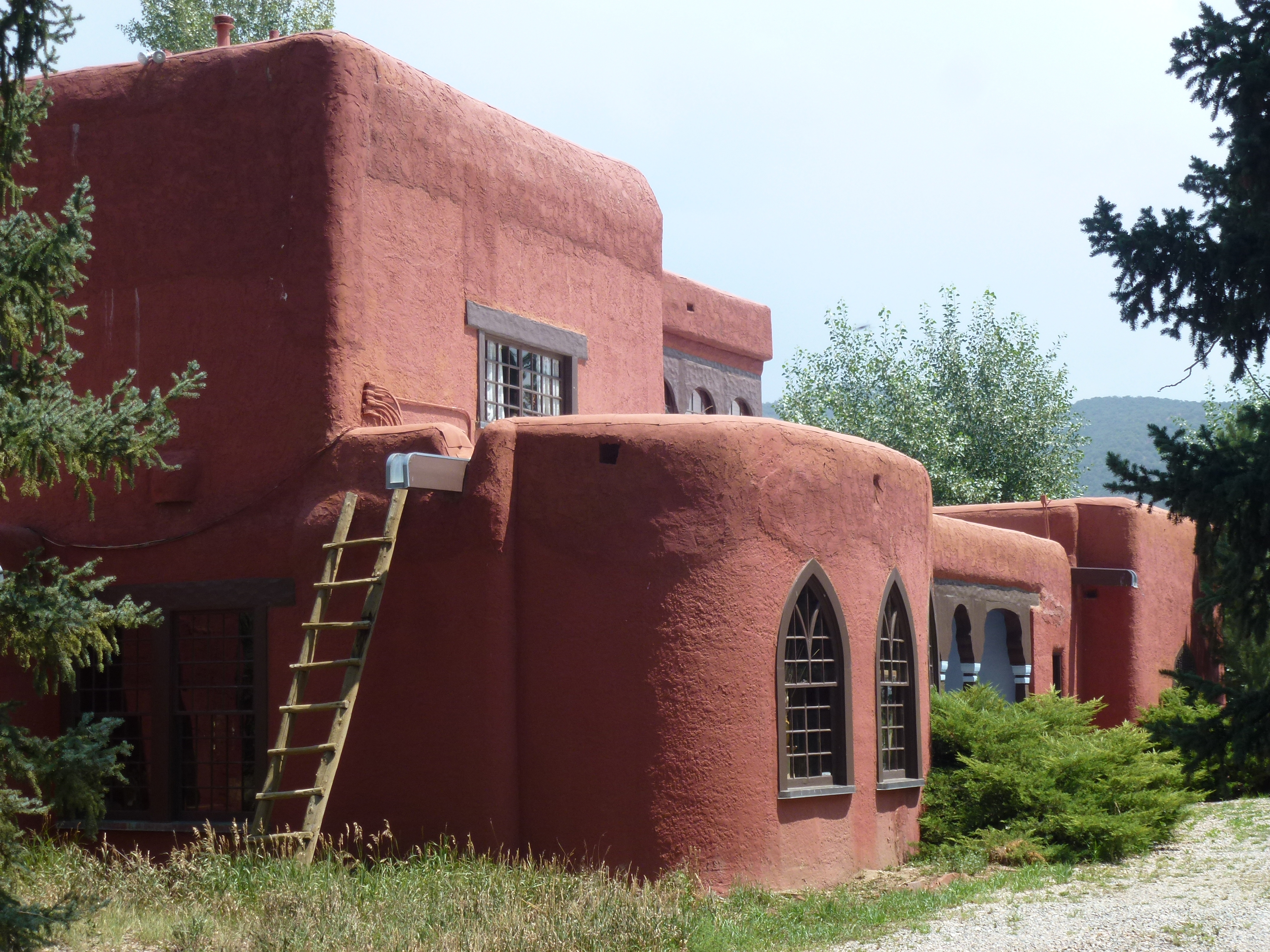
- Leon Gaspard House

- Location within New Mexico
- Location: Raton Rd., Taos, New Mexico
- Coordinates: 36°23′46″N 105°33′50″W
- Area: 3.5 acres (1.4 ha)
- Built: 1860
- Architect: Al Yaple
- Architectural style: Pueblo, Byzantine-Pueblo
- NRHP reference No.: 79001559
- NMSRCP No.: 705

Significant dates
- Added to NRHP: February 23, 1979
- Designated NMSRCP: October 20, 1978

The Leon Gaspard House, also known as Gaspard House Museum, was the Taos, New Mexico home of Russian artist Leon Gaspard who became a member of the Taos art colony. The house was listed as a National Register of Historic Places in 1979.

It is now a private residence.

== Gallery ==
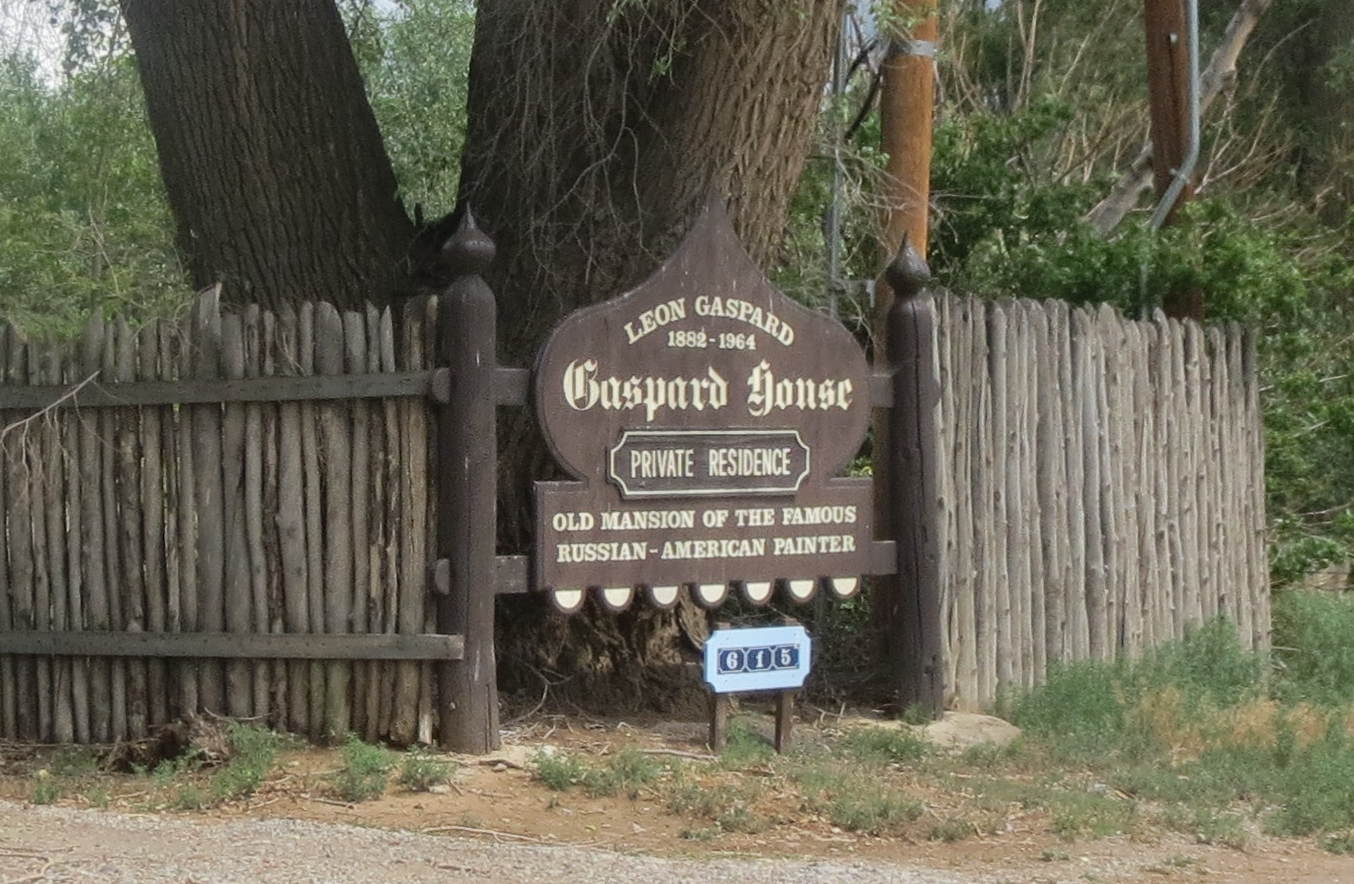
Leon Gaspard House sign

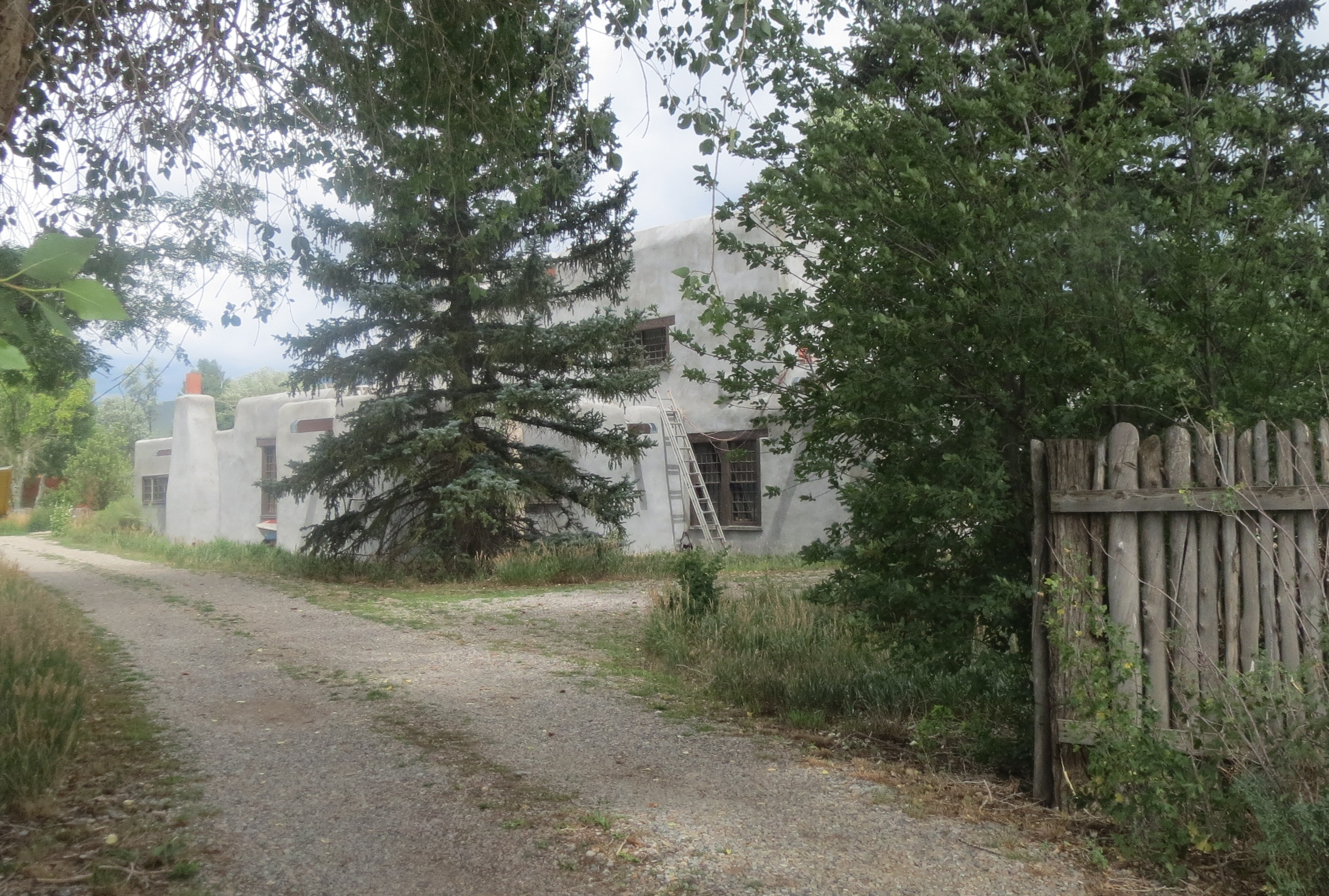
Leon Gaspard House road along the side of the house

== See also ==
- National Register of Historic Places listings in Taos County, New Mexico
