= Kit Carson House =

Historic house in New Mexico, United States

- U.S. National Register of Historic Places
- U.S. National Historic Landmark
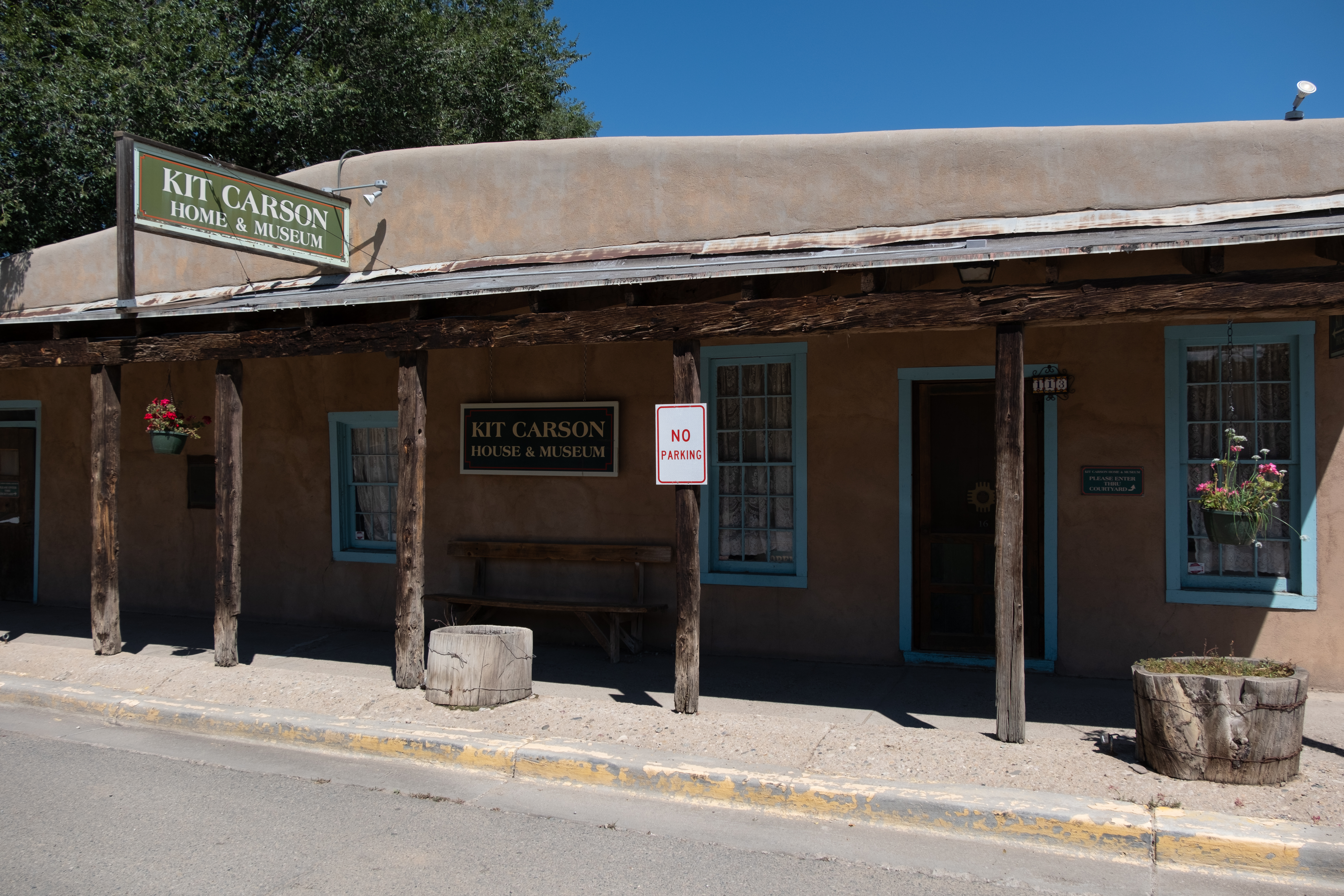
- Kit Carson House and Museum

- Location within New Mexico Location within the United States
- Location: Kit Carson Ave., Taos, New Mexico
- Coordinates: 36°24′25″N 105°34′20″W
- Area: less than one acre
- Built: 1825
- Architectural style: Spanish Colonial; Territorial
- NRHP reference No.: 66000948

Significant dates
- Added to NRHP: October 15, 1966
- Designated NHL: May 23, 1963

The Kit Carson House is a historic house museum at 113 Kit Carson Road in central Taos, New Mexico. Built in 1825, it was from 1843 until his death the home of frontiersman Kit Carson (1809-1868). An example of Spanish Colonial architecture, it is now owned by the local Masonic fraternity, and serves as a museum dedicated to Carson's life. It was designated a National Historic Landmark in 1963.

== Description and history ==
The Kit Carson House stands a short way east of Taos's central plaza, on the north side of Kit Carson Road. It is a modest single-story adobe structure, built in 1825, that is an east-facing U shape with a central courtyard. The oldest portion of the house consists of the front three rooms, and the next room to the north.

Kit Carson grew up in the frontier west, and became renowned as a fur trapper and guide on numerous United States Army expeditions against Native Americans and also during the American Civil War. In 1843 he married Josefa Jaramillo, who was from a leading Taos family, and purchased this house. It remained the couple's principal home until 1868. They were away from it 1851-54 and 1866–67, when Carson was stationed elsewhere. In early 1868 the family moved to the Colorado Territory, where both died.

The Kit Carson house was passed through a string of owners between Kit Carson’s death in 1868 and the acquisition of the property by Bent Lodge #42 (a masonic lodge founded by Kit Carson) in 1910. The house had degraded and remained in a state of disrepair until 1952 when the Kit Carson Memorial Foundation Inc was established to restore and rehabilitate the property. The foundation now operates the property as a house-museum where visitors can take tours, purchase souvenirs, and learn about Carson’s exploits in life.

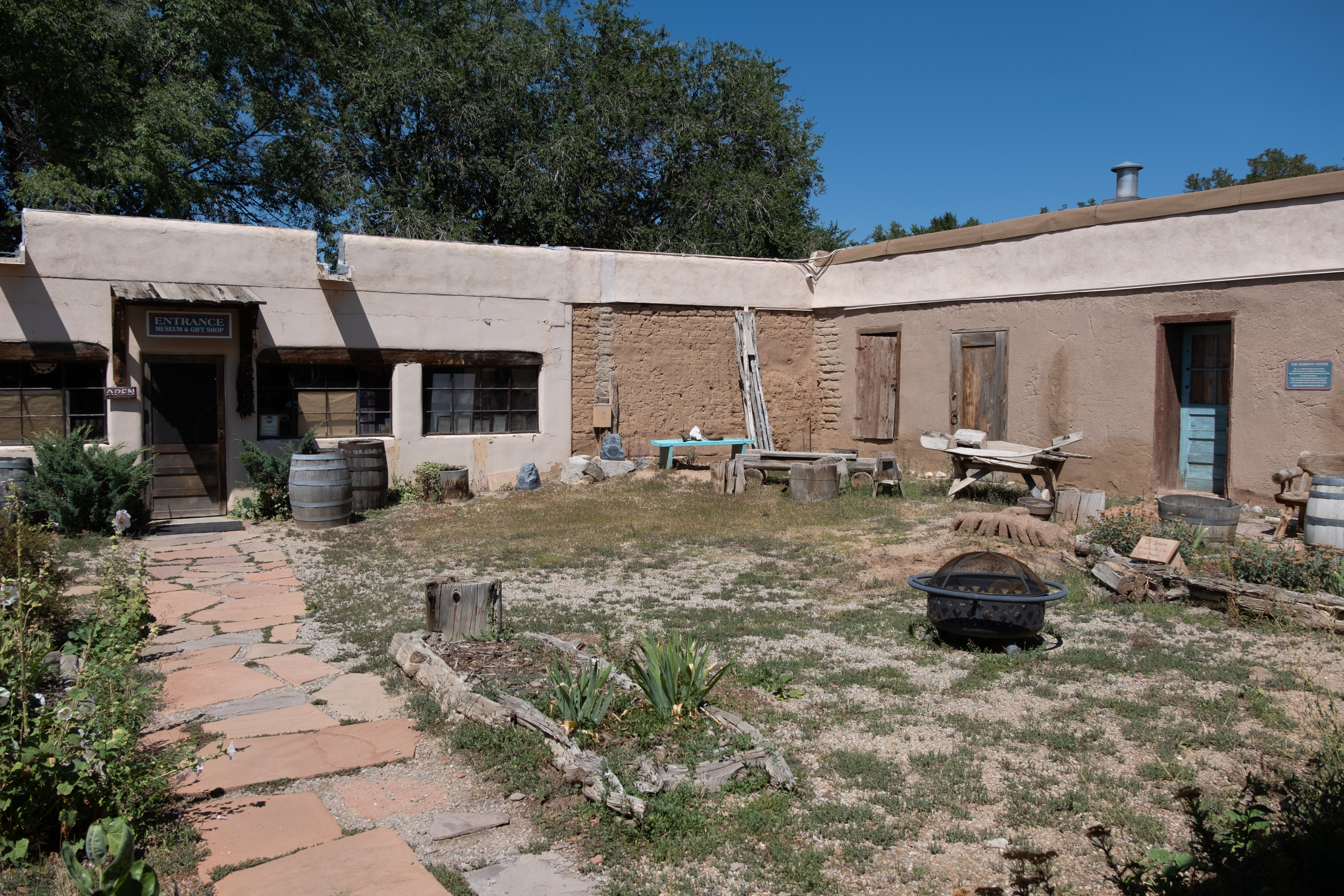
Plaza of Kit Carson House in Taos, NM

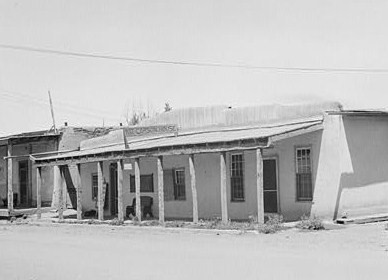
Kit Carson House in 1936 (HABS Photo)

== Current State of the Kit Carson House ==
The Kit Carson house is styled and furnished in the Spanish Colonial Style, and most of the house's rooms have been restored to fit within that style, matching their original condition as closely as possible. The restorations go so far as to include authentic recreations of furniture from the time. Additionally, several artifacts surrounding the life of Kit Carson and his family have been incorporated throughout the property, including a replica of his .50 caliber rifle, a United States Army sabre with its scabbard, and Josefa's sewing box.

The museum constructed around the house includes a full guided tour which tells visitors about Carson's life, death, and other important details and achievements of his. One of the first stops in the tour includes a 20 minute video on the History Channel that is all about Kit Carson and what he accomplished. It culminates at the nearby Kit Carson Memorial State Park, where the graves of Carson and his wife, Josefa, can be found. The house has also undergone several additions, such as a gift shop and bookstore which supports the mission of the foundation and the museum itself.

== Awards & Achievements ==
- In July 1963, the National Park Service approved the Kit Carson House for National Historic Landmark Status
- In October 1963, the Kit Carson Memorial Foundation Inc. was awarded an AASLH (American Association for State and Local History) Award of Merit for their efforts to preserve and restore the Kit Carson House

== Appearances in Academic Literature ==
Prairie Schooner is a literary publication put out by the University of Nebraska since 1926. The Kit Carson House appears within Vol. 42 No. 2 (Summer 1968) during an expedition to find D. H. Lawrence's ranch in Taos detailed in an article called The Spinsters of Taos.

== See also ==
- National Register of Historic Places listings in Taos County, New Mexico
- List of National Historic Landmarks in New Mexico
