= La Loma Plaza Historic District =

Historic district in New Mexico, United States

- U.S. National Register of Historic Places
- U.S. Historic district
- NM State Register of Cultural Properties
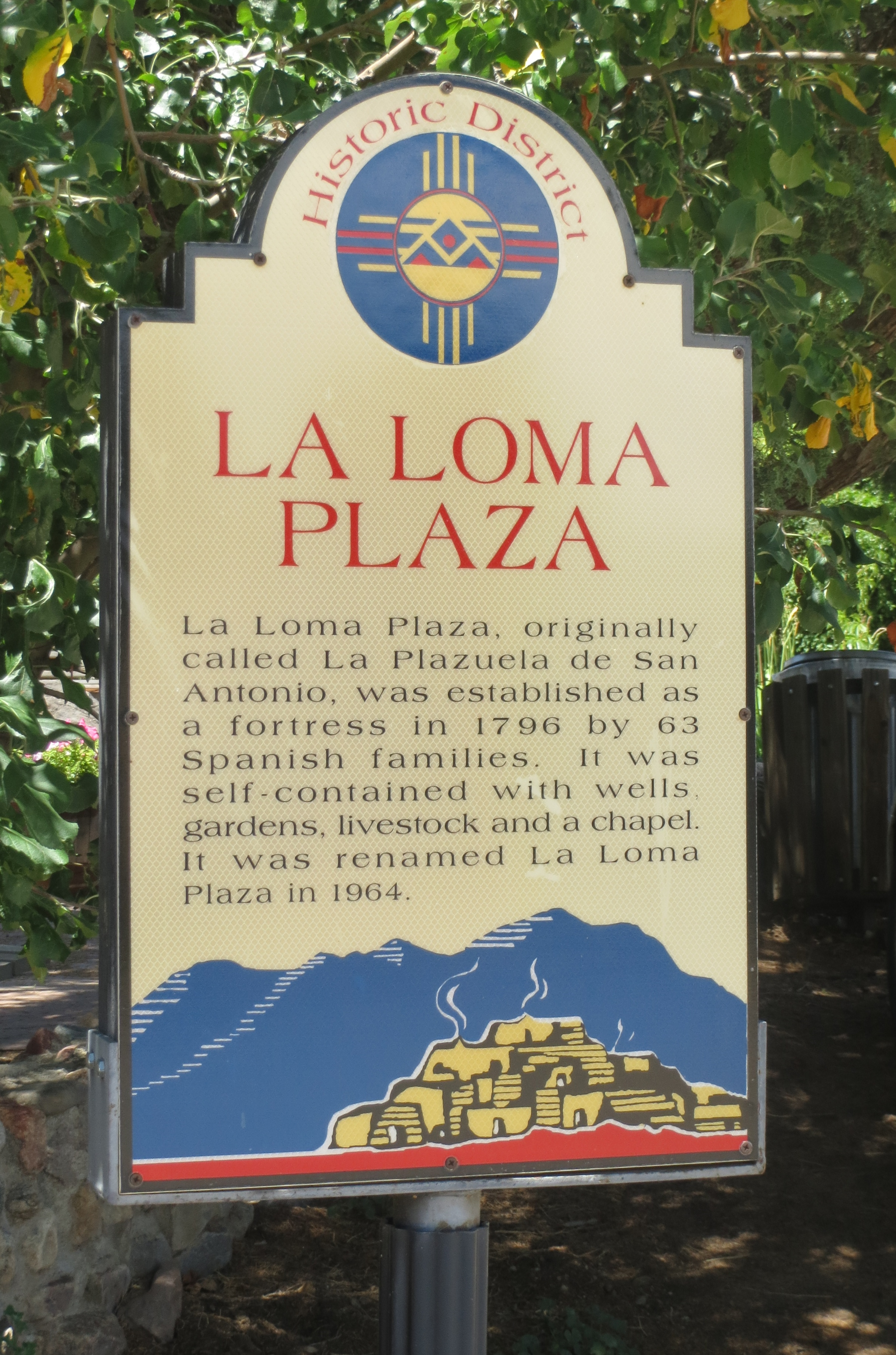
- La Loma Plaza Historic District sign

- Location within New Mexico
- Location: NM 240, Taos, New Mexico
- Coordinates: 36°24′23″N 105°34′50″W
- Area: 11 acres (4.5 ha)
- Built: 1795
- Architectural style: Colonial, Pueblo, Spanish Colonial
- NRHP reference No.: 82003339
- NMSRCP No.: 861

Significant dates
- Added to NRHP: July 8, 1982
- Designated NMSRCP: April 15, 1982

The La Loma Plaza Historic District is a historic neighborhood in Taos, New Mexico that was listed as a National Register of Historic Places in 1982.

== History ==
Taos was originally settled in part due to Don Fernando de Taos land grants, which resulted in the construction of the fortified La Loma Plaza, located on a hill west of the central Taos plaza.

To protect themselves from attacks by Plains Indians, such as Comanche, Apache and Utes, the Spanish settlers built homes contiguously with shared common walls and the outer walls were solid adobe. Entrances to the center of the plaza were limited. It is believed that La Loma was settled between 1795 when most Spanish settlers left the protection of the fortified Taos Pueblo to settle in land that is now the town of Taos and before 1846 when New Mexico became a United States provisional government and fortified settlements were less important.

Water was generally supplied by wells. Residents had chickens, pigs, cows and horses that grazed on pastureland between La Loma and the Taos Plaza. The settlers built the San Antonio church in the plaza, which was blessed in October 1876 by Archbishop Lamy. They also helped found the town of Taos. Some of the residents were artists.

Most of the houses within the plaza have been restored.

== Gallery ==
La Loma Plaza Inn

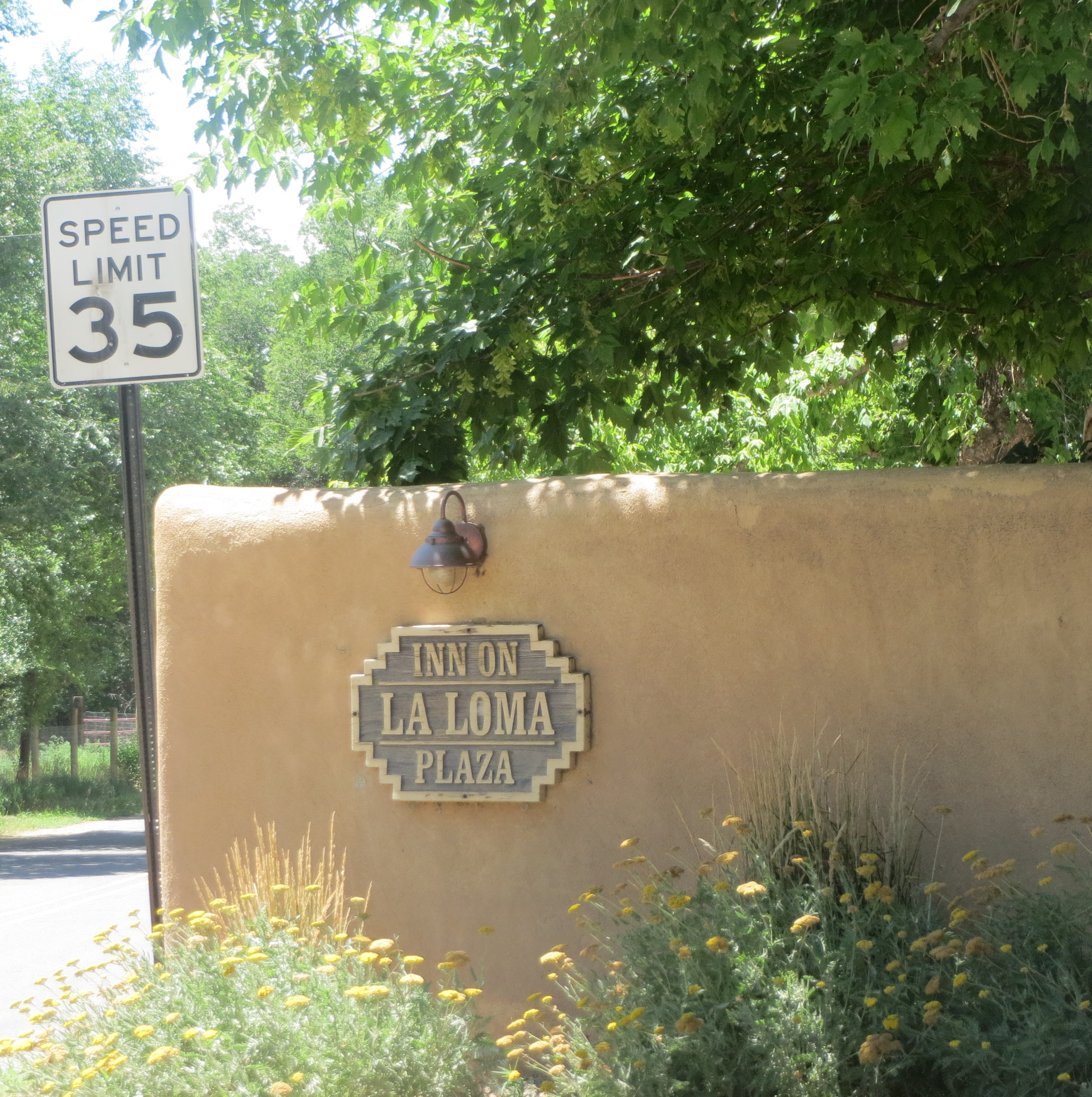
La Loma Plaza Inn, Taos, New Mexico

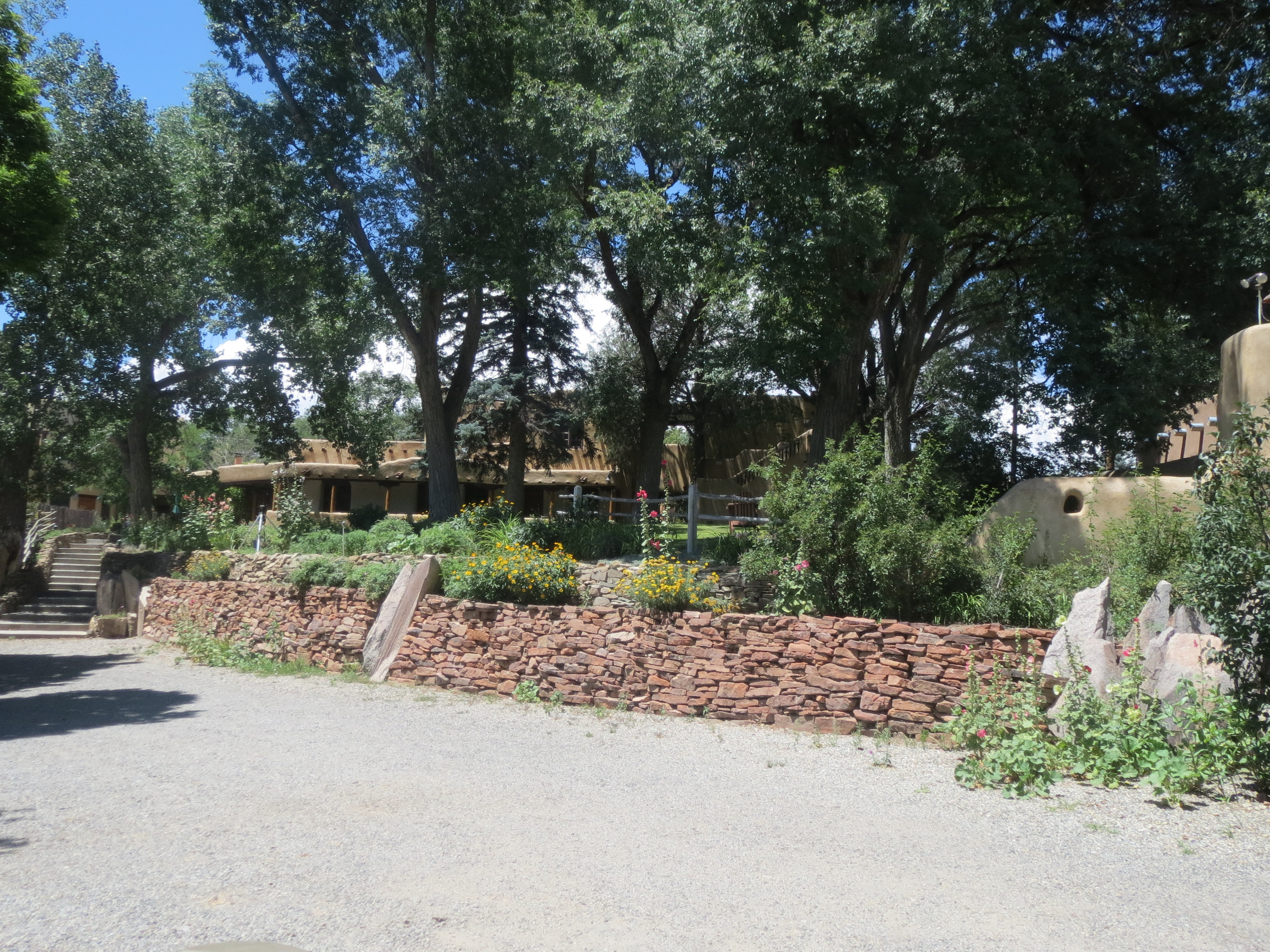
La Loma Plaza Inn, Taos, New Mexico

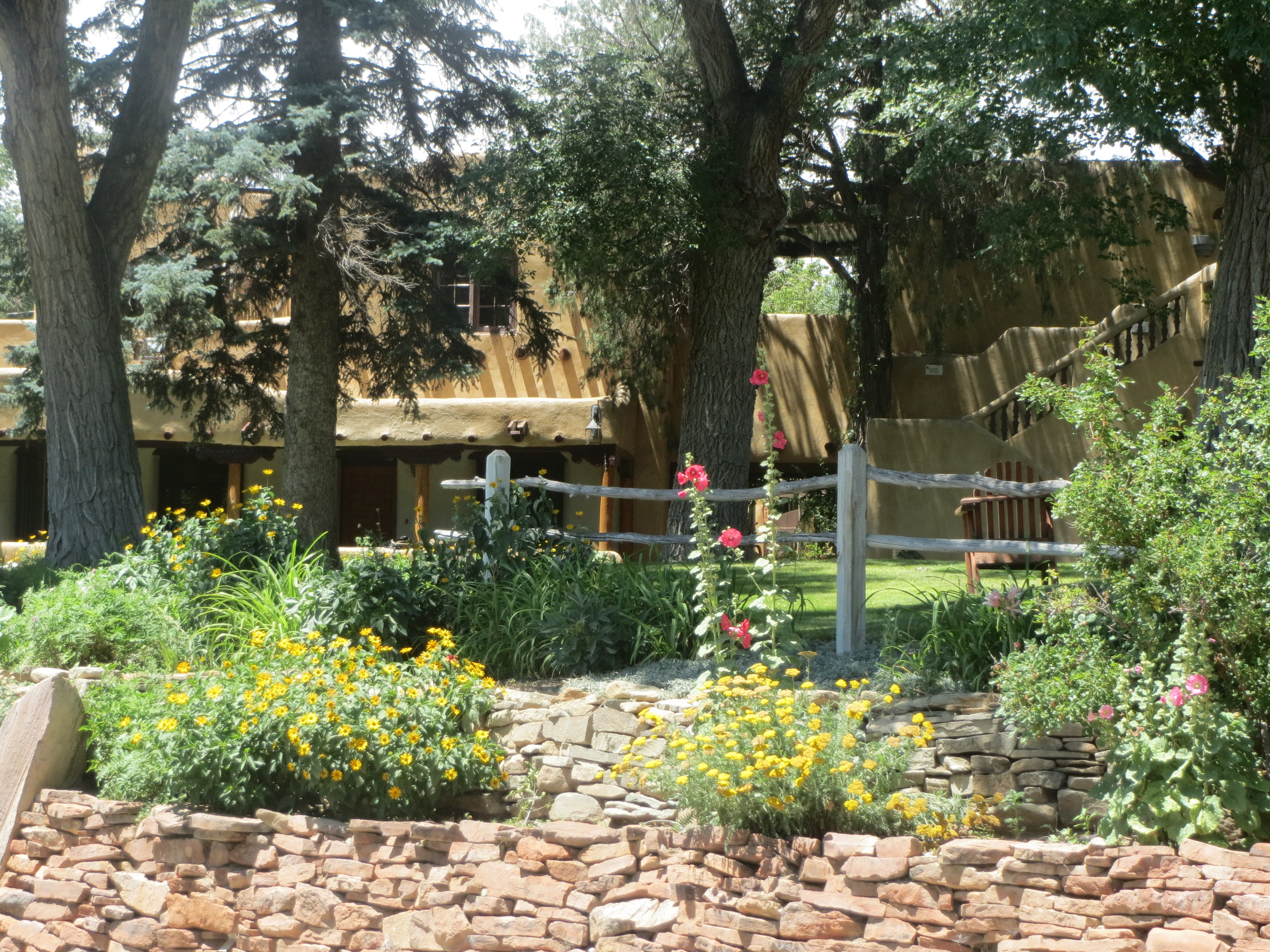
La Loma Plaza Inn, Taos, New Mexico
La Loma Plaza

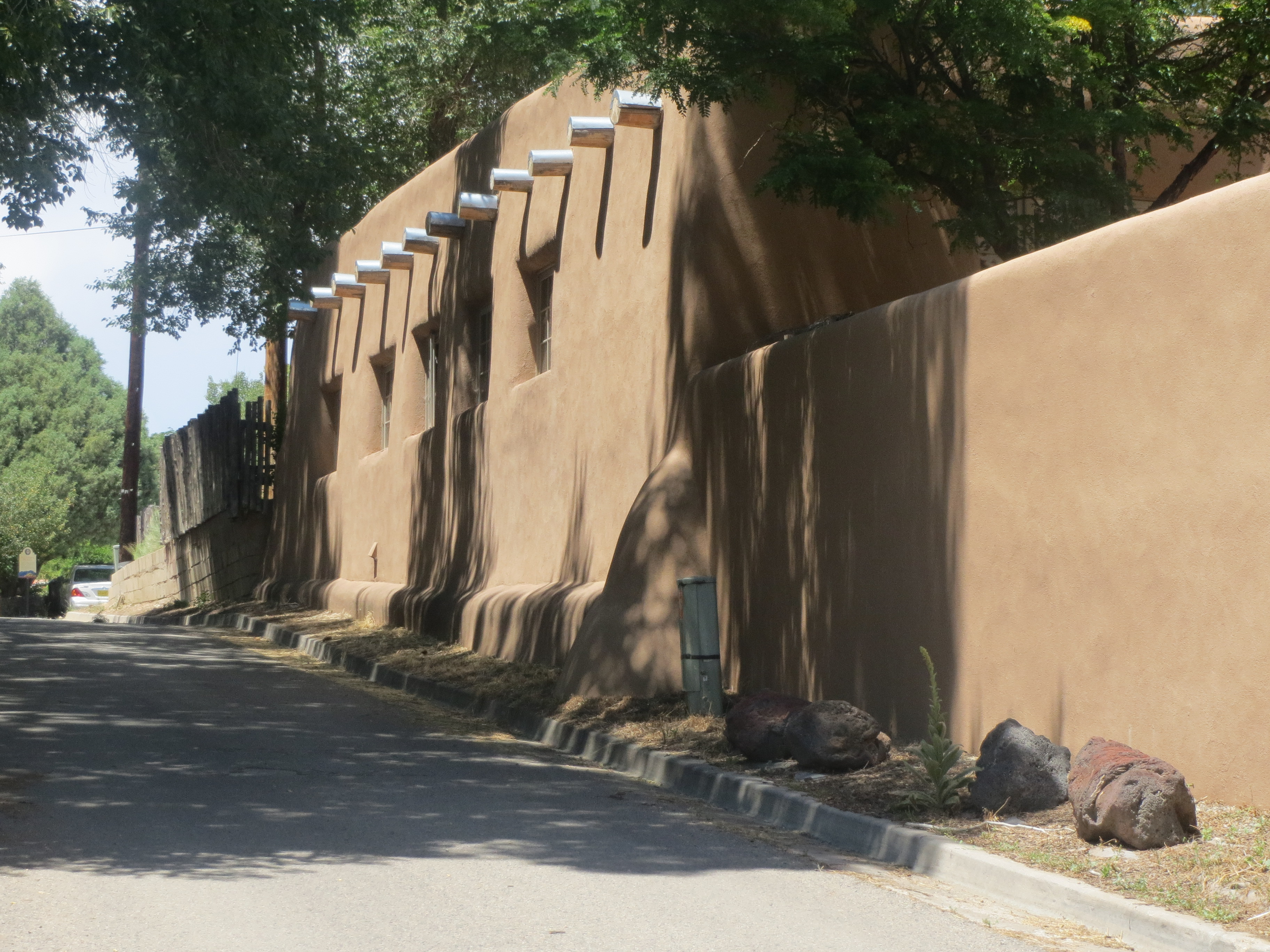
Road into La Loma Plaza

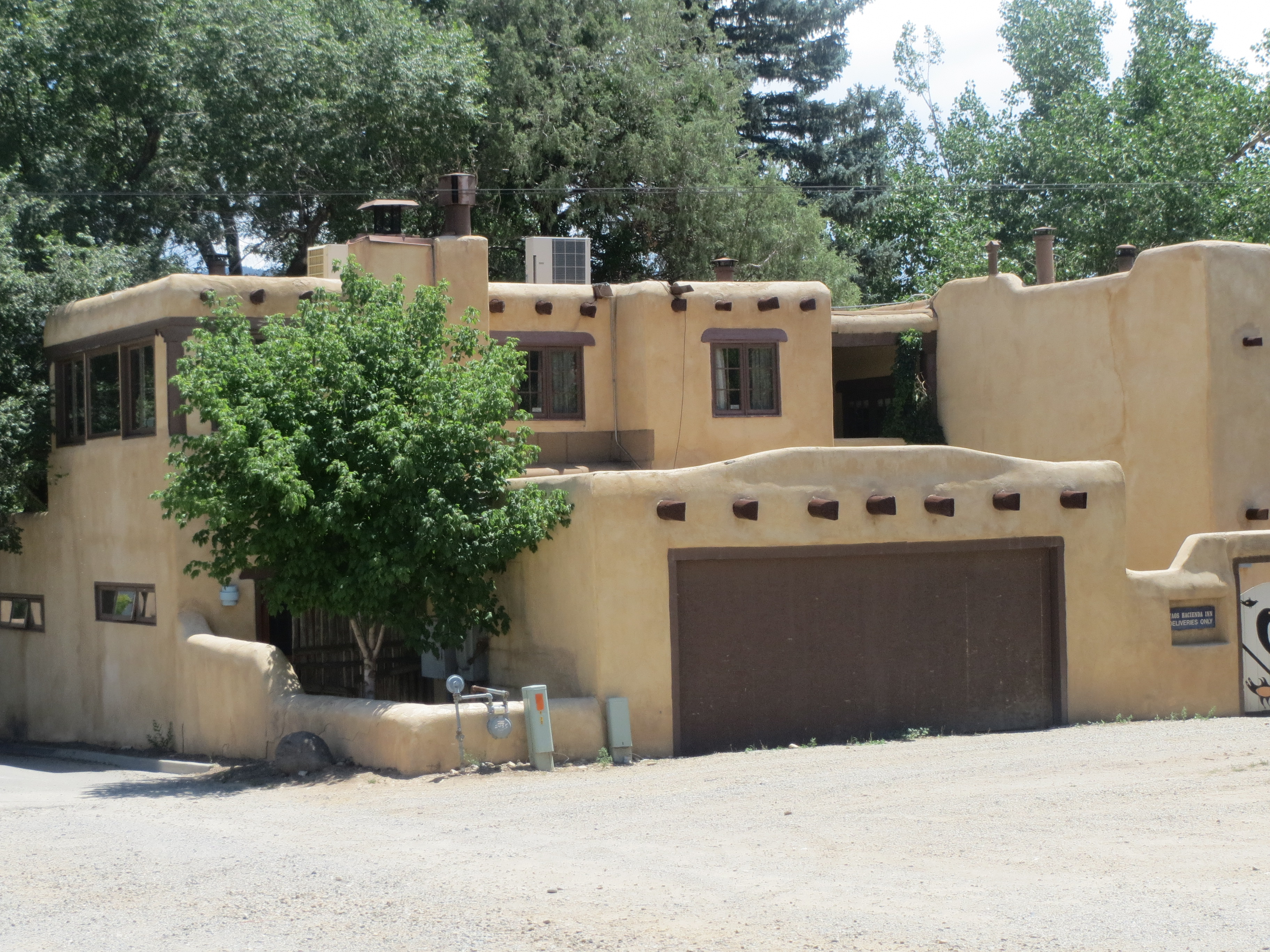
Within the plaza and the back of La Loma Plaza

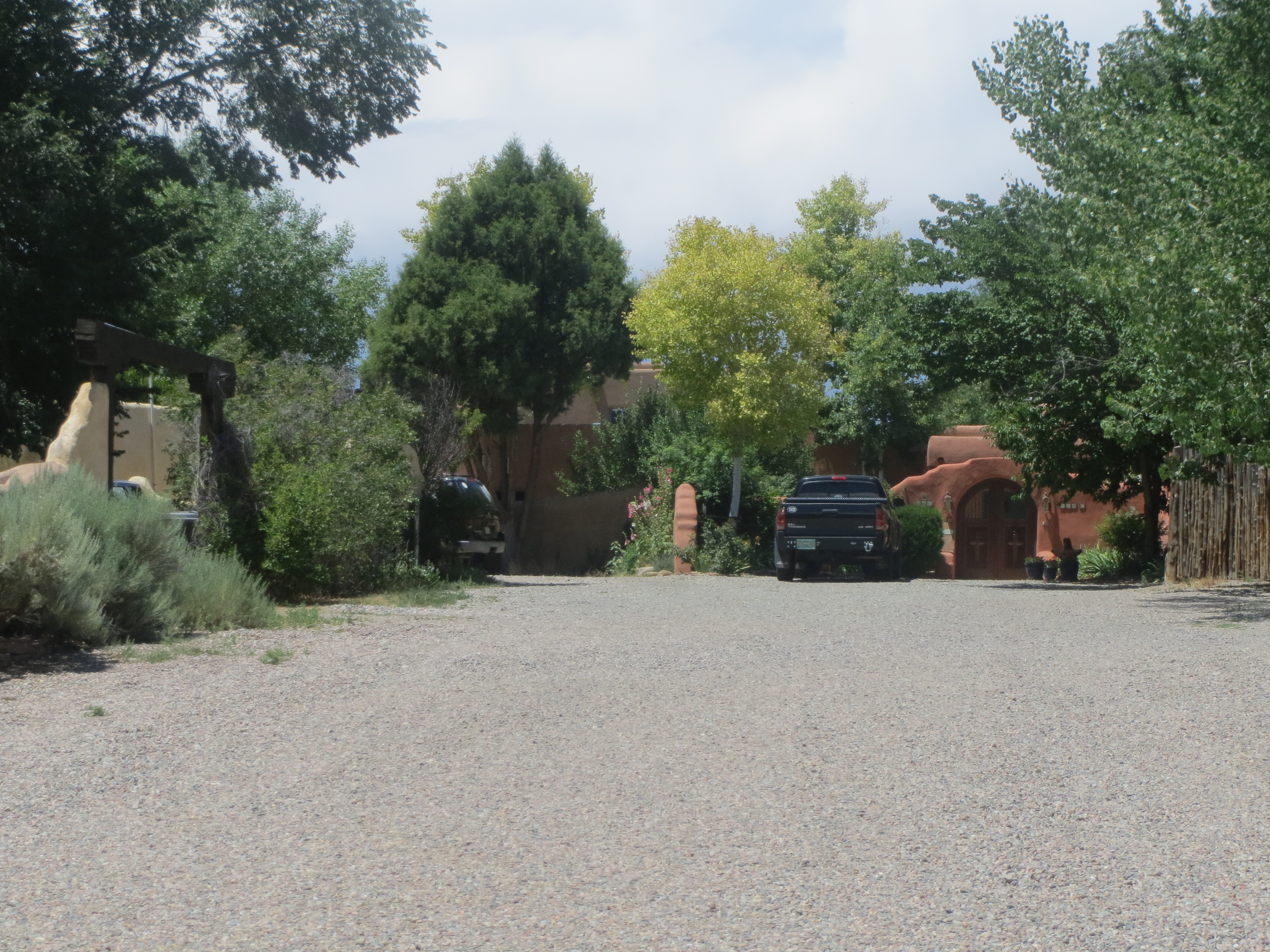
La Loma Plaza houses on the western side of the plaza

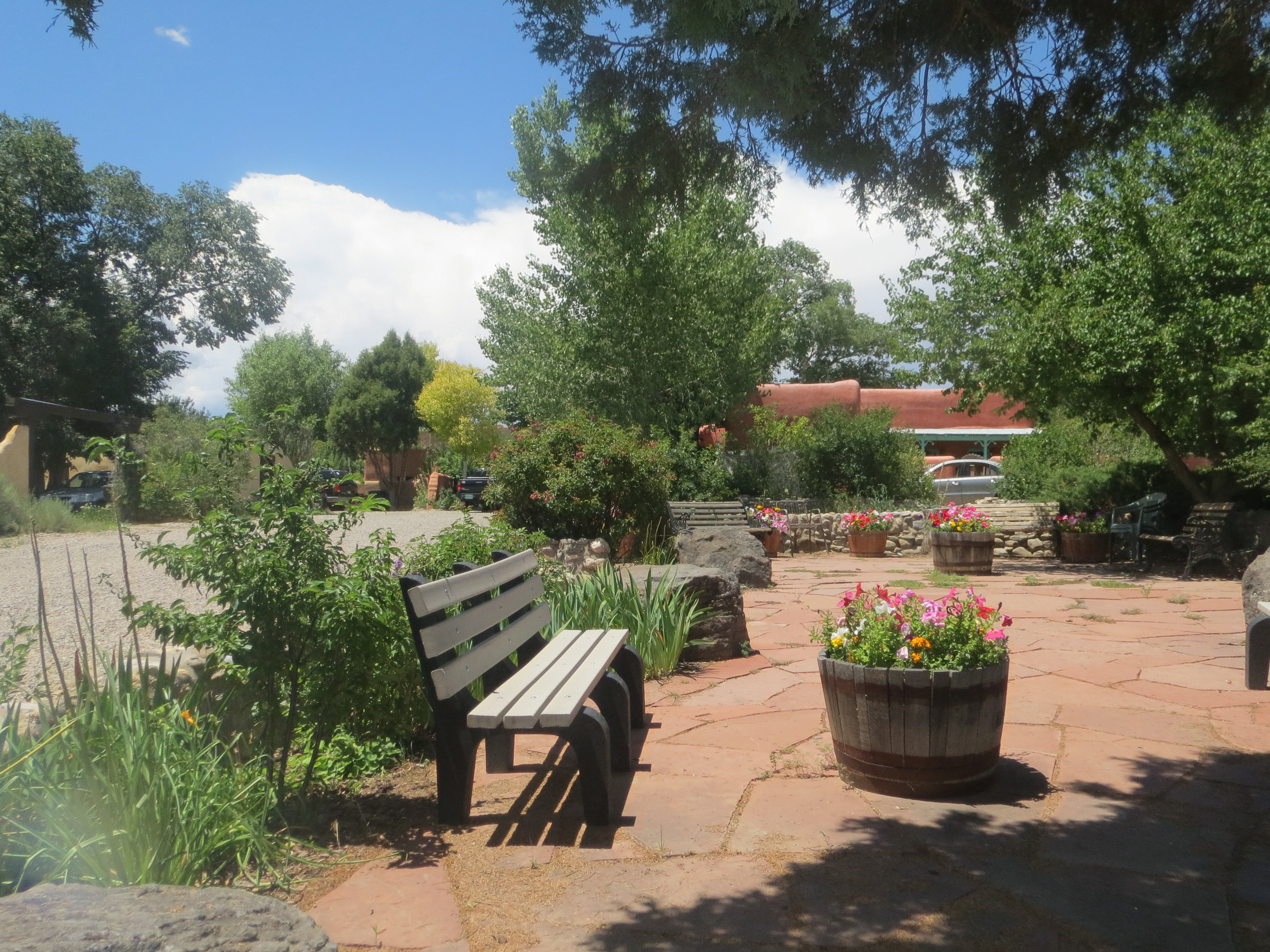
La Loma Plaza park, which is surrounded by houses

== See also ==
- National Register of Historic Places listings in Taos County, New Mexico
