= Carson School =

- U.S. National Register of Historic Places
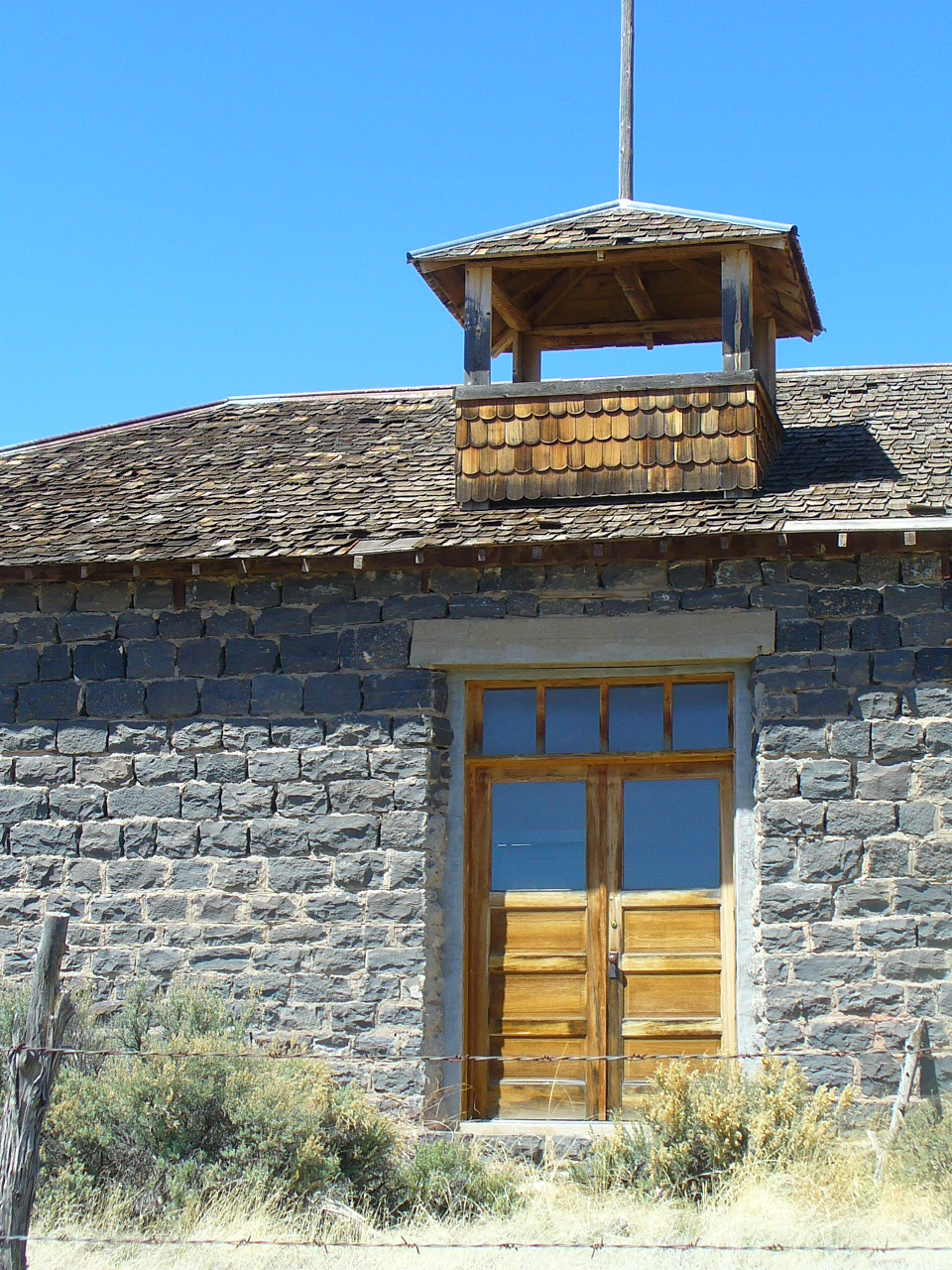

- Location within New Mexico
- Location: NM 96, Carson, New Mexico
- Coordinates: 36°21′53″N 105°45′55″W
- Area: 1.3 acres (0.53 ha)
- Built: 1920
- Built by: Troy and Verde Shupe; Mr. Willis
- NRHP reference No.: 86000233
- Added to NRHP: February 13, 1986

The Carson School, on New Mexico State Road 96 in Carson, New Mexico, was built in 1920. It was listed on the National Register of Historic Places in February 1986.

It was built as a one-room schoolhouse, and was later divided into two classrooms. William Shupe moved his family to Carson in 1912, and together with others built an irrigation ditch, the Arroyo Aguaje de la Petaca, which enabled irrigation of the Carson area. The Shupe family grew pinto beans on 212 acres (86 ha). Troy Shupe, one of his sons, was contracted to build the schoolhouse, and Verde Shupe, another son, hauled water, stone and lumber used in the structure. A stonemason, Mr. Willis, shaped the native basalt rock quarried from nearby. The school is the only surviving one of several works by Mr. Willis in the area.

About 40 students attended the school at its peak, when the Carson community had a population of about 150.

The schoolhouse also served for Mormon church services, and occasionally for funerals. After 1932, when education was consolidated away, the building was used for community activities such as dances, potluck dinners, and country fairs.
