= Ojo Caliente Hot Springs =

Thermal spring in New Mexico, USA

- P’osí P’ohpee (Tewa); Ojo Caliente Mineral Springs
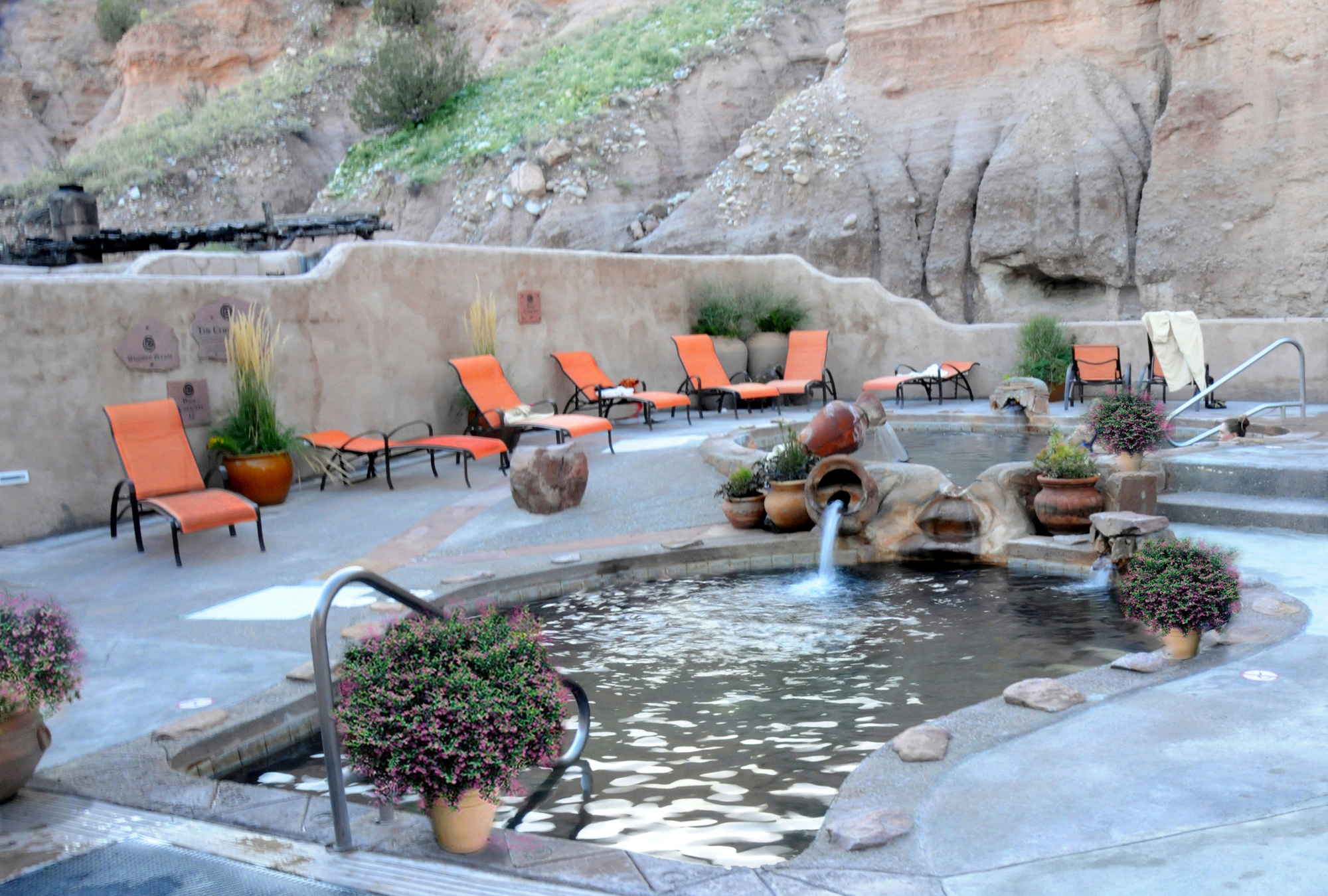

- Location within New Mexico Location within the United States
- Location: Ojo Caliente, Northern New Mexico
- Coordinates: 36°18′37″N 106°2′48″W
- Elevation: 1,892 m (6,207 ft)
- Type: geothermal
- Discharge: 100,000 gallons per day
- Temperature: 80 °F (27 °C)

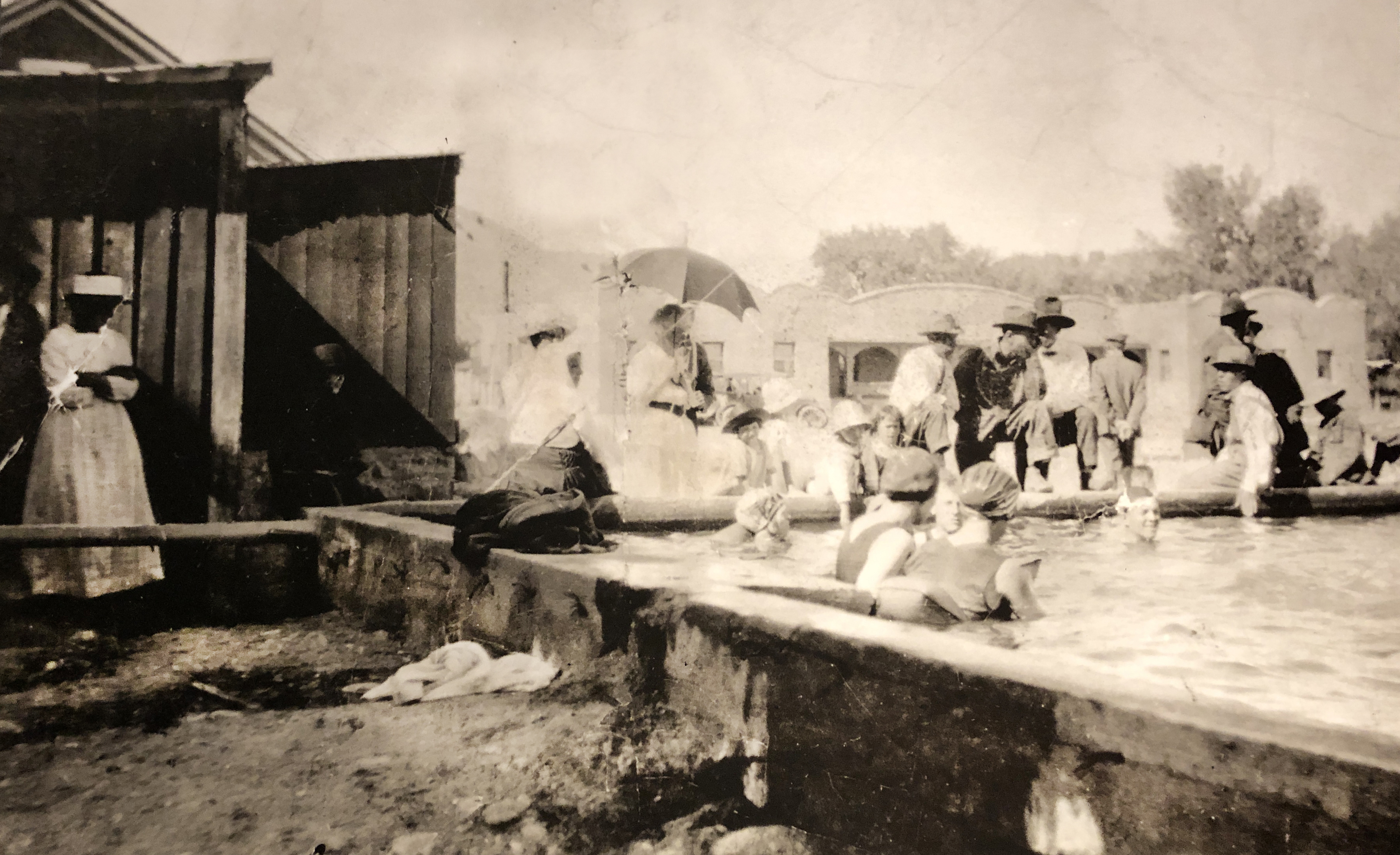
Ojo Caliente Mineral Springs Hotel, built in 1916

Ojo Caliente Hot Springs (Tewa: P’osí P’ohpee) is a group of thermal springs located in Taos County, New Mexico, United States. They are also known as the Ojo Caliente Mineral Springs. These hot springs were used by native New Mexicans for many years. In the late 19th century the springs began to be developed for alleged therapeutic use for several ailments, including tuberculosis.

== History ==
The hot springs were used by prehistoric people, according to James A. Caufield.(Caufield 1985:8-1) Later, the springs were used by the ancestral Native Pueblo peoples for generations before the Spanish arrived in the area. Taos oral history records that the hot springs (Northern Tiwa: P’ołuop’ó’ona) were the initial home of their Summer People moiety before they moved to Taos Pueblo. Tewa oral history holds the springs as an emergence place and records that the hero P'oseyemu accessed the underworld via the sacred warm water springs. The original place name is P’osí P’ohpee, and the springs were the site of P’osí Ówîngeh Kayyee which roughly translates to "ruined village at the place of the green bubbling hot springs". The Puebloan village housed more than 1,000 people and contained numerous structures. It is thought to have been abandoned in the 16th century due to an epidemic. Other Native peoples used the springs as well, including distant tribes such as the Navajo, Comanche, and Ute.

Early Spanish colonizers, including Coronado's soldiers, soaked in the healing water. In 1534, the Spanish colonizer Cabeza de Vaca visited the springs and named them Ojo Caliente. It is thought that before the 1680 Pueblo Revolt, Spanish colonists used the springs. In 1793, the Ojo Caliente Land Grant was signed by Governor Fernando de la Concha; the document approved settlers including Luis Duran and José Antonio Espinosa and 52 other settlers. In 1807, Duran traveled with Spanish soldiers during the colonial period where he encountered Zebulon Pike who referred to the springs as a "natural curiosity". The hot springs were first recorded in geologic publications in 1875.

A bathhouse was constructed in 1860 by the Taos native, Antonio Joseph and his wife. The Mission Revival style building was built with thick adobe walls and rough-hewn viga roof beams. In 1868, the Joseph's opened the hot springs as a natural health spa. Another account states that Joseph opened the resort in 1880. The anthropologist, Nancy Owen Lewis writes in her book, Chasing the Cure in New Mexico, that Ojo Caliente hot springs had lodging for 60 people by 1880, and that the resort attracted hundreds of individuals who soaked in the mineral waters for rheumatism, kidney problems as well as skin problems.(Lewis 2016:21)

In 1881, rail service to the area provided by the Denver and Rio Grande Railroad connected to a stage coach stop ten miles from the springs.(Lewis 2016:21) The town of Ojo Caliente grew up around the springs providing lodging, a general store and a post office. After Antonio Joseph died in 1910, his family further developed the property as well as bottled and sold mineral water from the springs. While the springs originally accepted those with tuberculosis in 1903, by 1910, the resort published advertisements stating "People with consumption...are not accepted".(Lewis 2016:159, 272)

In 1916, a hotel was constructed on the site. In 1924, Anthony Joseph, a relative of Antonio Joseph, and his wife constructed a round barn one quarter mile North of the hot springs. The barn is architecturally significant because it is the only round barn in the United States constructed from adobe.

In 1932, the Mauro family purchased the resort and managed it for several decades. It was partially rebuilt and renovated in the 1980s, and in 1999 it changed hands again. The natural hot springs were enjoyed for centuries before being turned into a resort.

The historical hot springs Mission style/Spanish Revival style buildings were entered into the National Register of Historic Places on November 17, 1985, NRHP ID #85003496.

== Description ==
There are seven developed soaking pools, and a seasonal mud pool; each has its own specific mineral content. The soaking pools include the Iron Spring, Arsenic Spring, Lithia Spring and Soda Spring, among others. There are several other warm and cold springs between Ojo Caliente and La Madera.

== Water profile ==
The major mineral constituents of the five springs are lithium, arsenic, iron and sodium/soda. Temperatures range from 80 °F to 106 °F.

The hot mineral water emerges from the five springs in the Ojo Caliente system at 340 liters per minute. The mineral content of the system consists of sodium, potassium, lithium, magnesium, calcium, bicarbonate, cloride, florine, bromine, boron, silica, arsenic and iron.

The springs are heated by a volcanic aquifer and produce 100,000 liters per day of hot mineral water.

== Location ==
The hot springs are approximately one hour North of Santa Fe by car; from Taos, they are a 45-minute drive Southwest. They are located off of NM-414 across the Rio Ojo Caliente, near the village of Ojo Caliente. The Ojo Caliente Hot Springs Round Barn, built in 1924, is located nearby, and is listed on the national register of historic places.

== Gallery ==
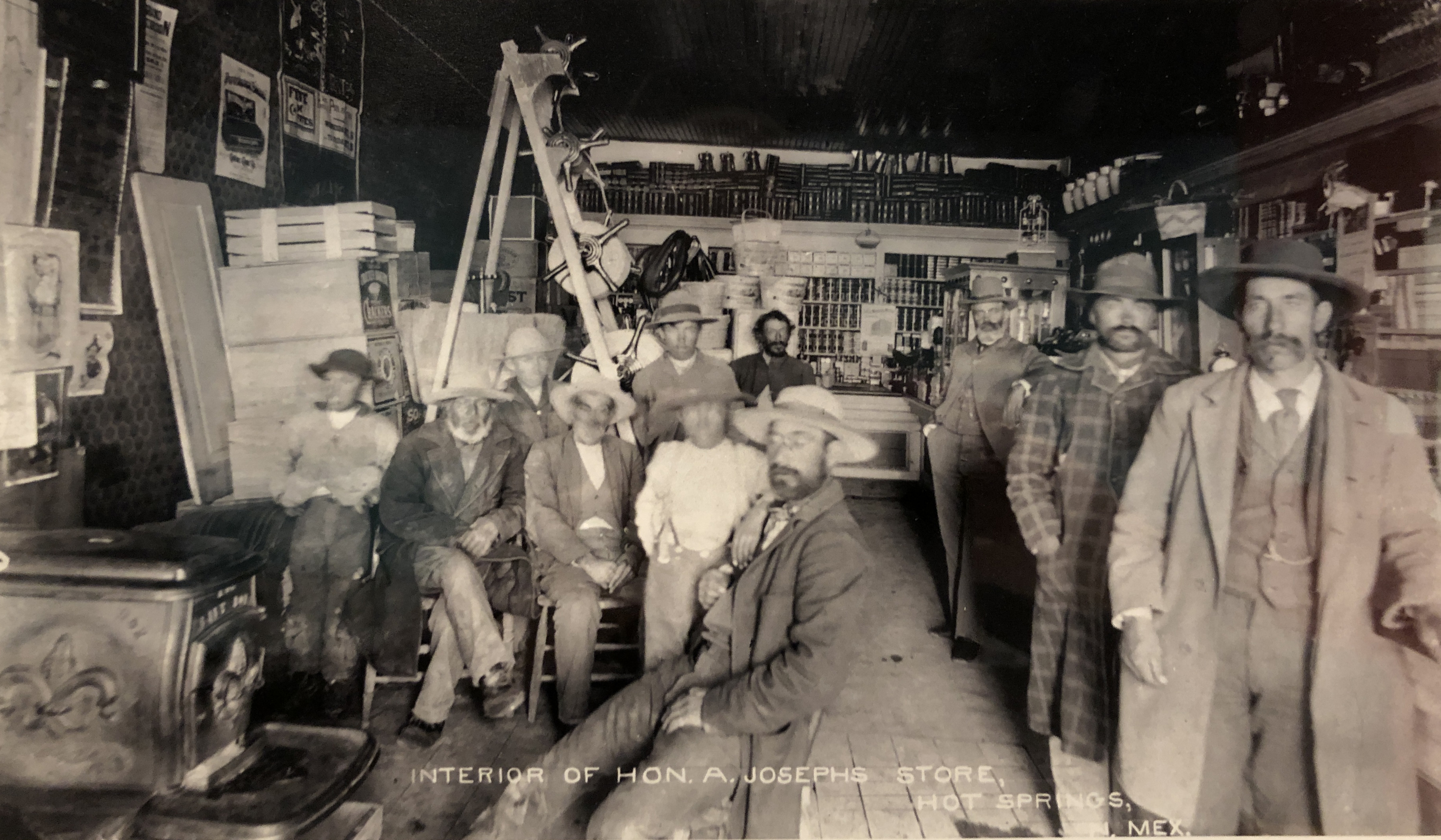
Interior of Hon. A Josepth's Store, Ojo Caliente, NM, c.1885

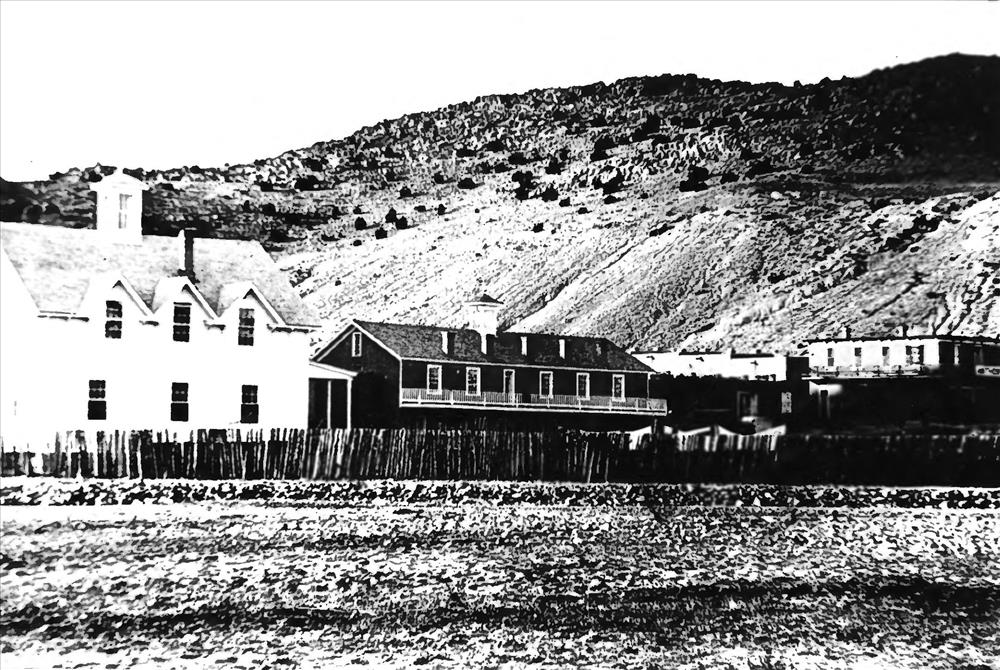
Historical Ojo Caliente Mineral Springs buildings

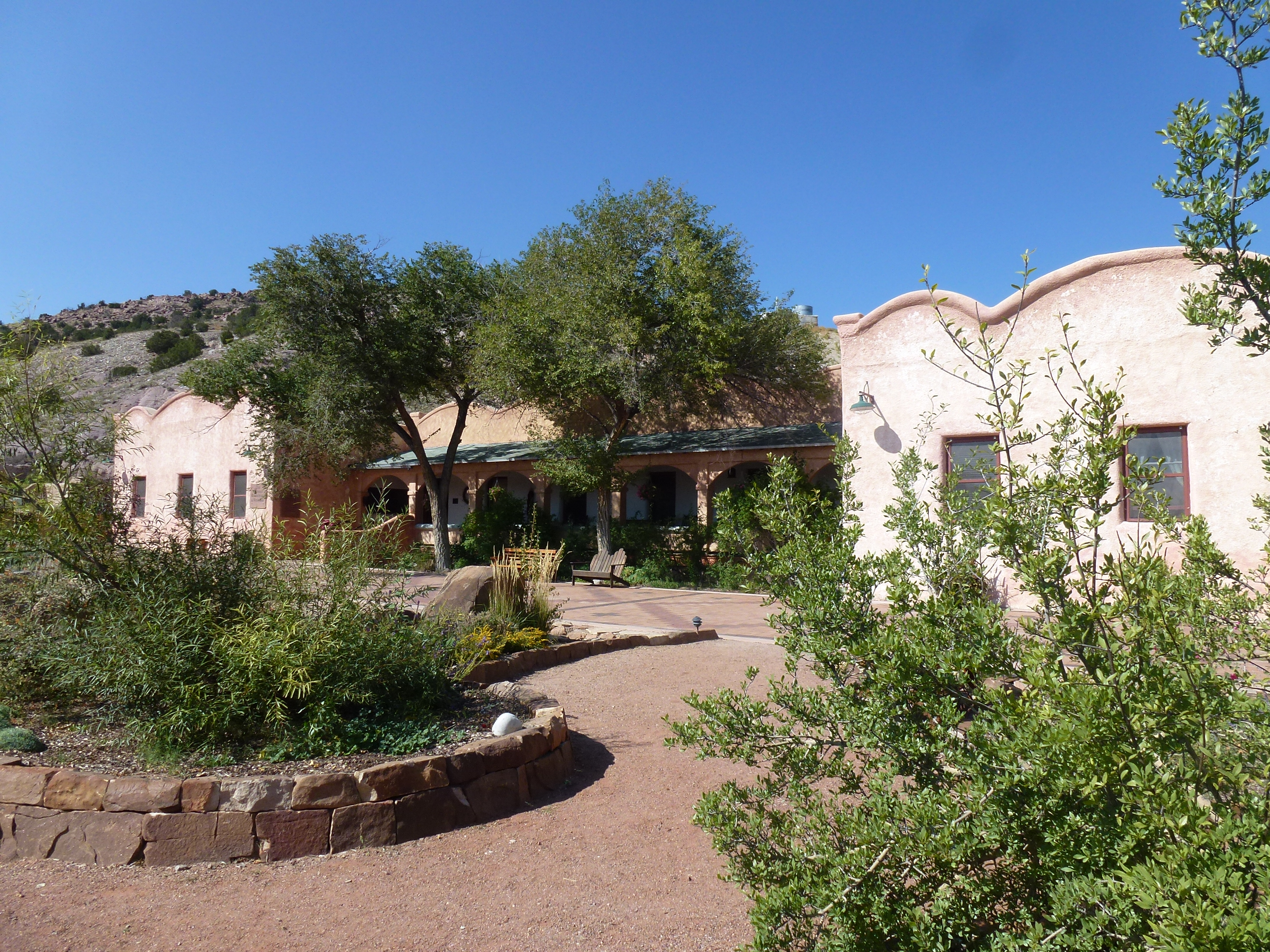
Ojo Caliente historical building facade

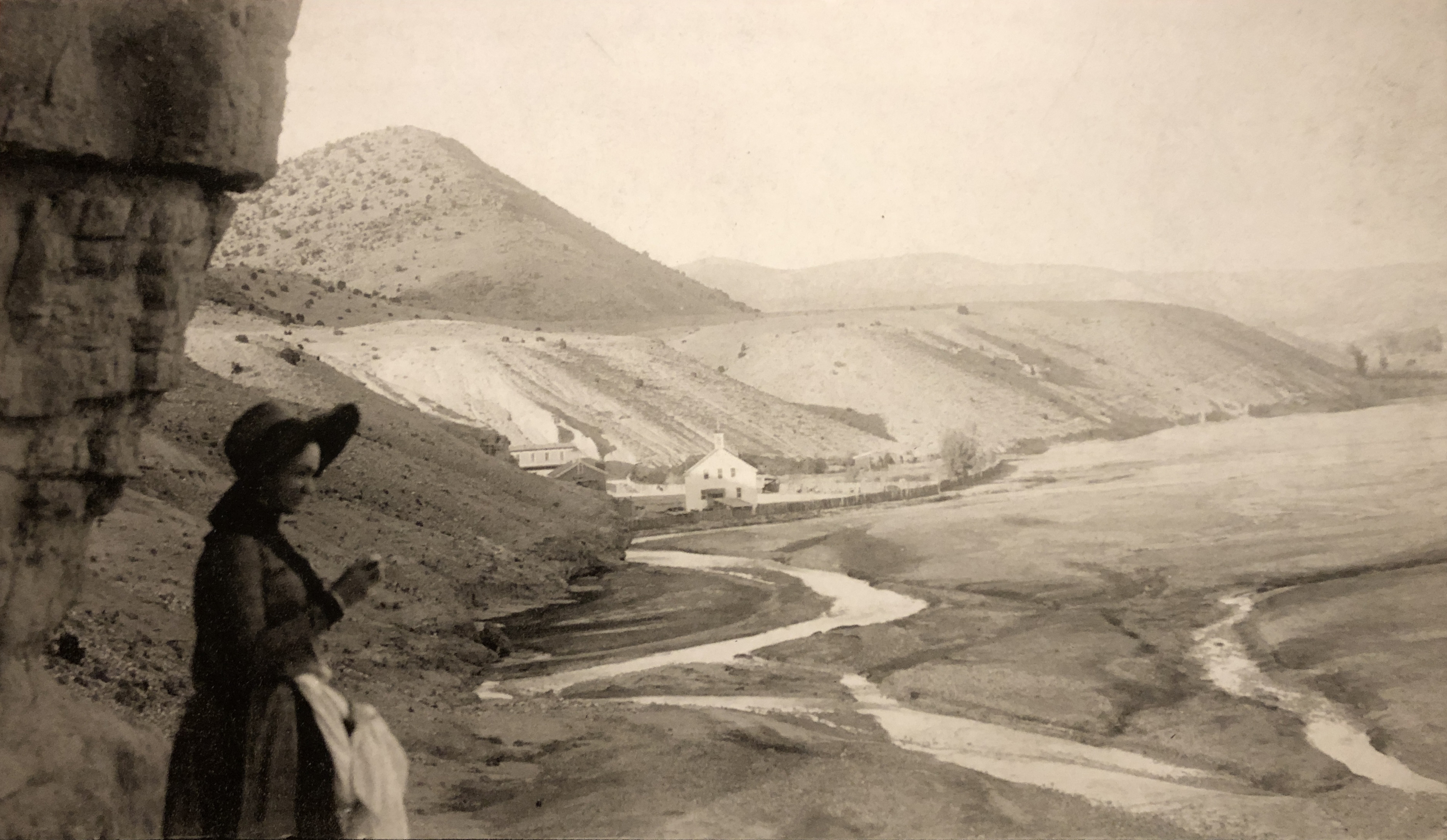
Looking up Caliente Rio at the Hot Springs, photo by Dana B. Chase, 1884–1892

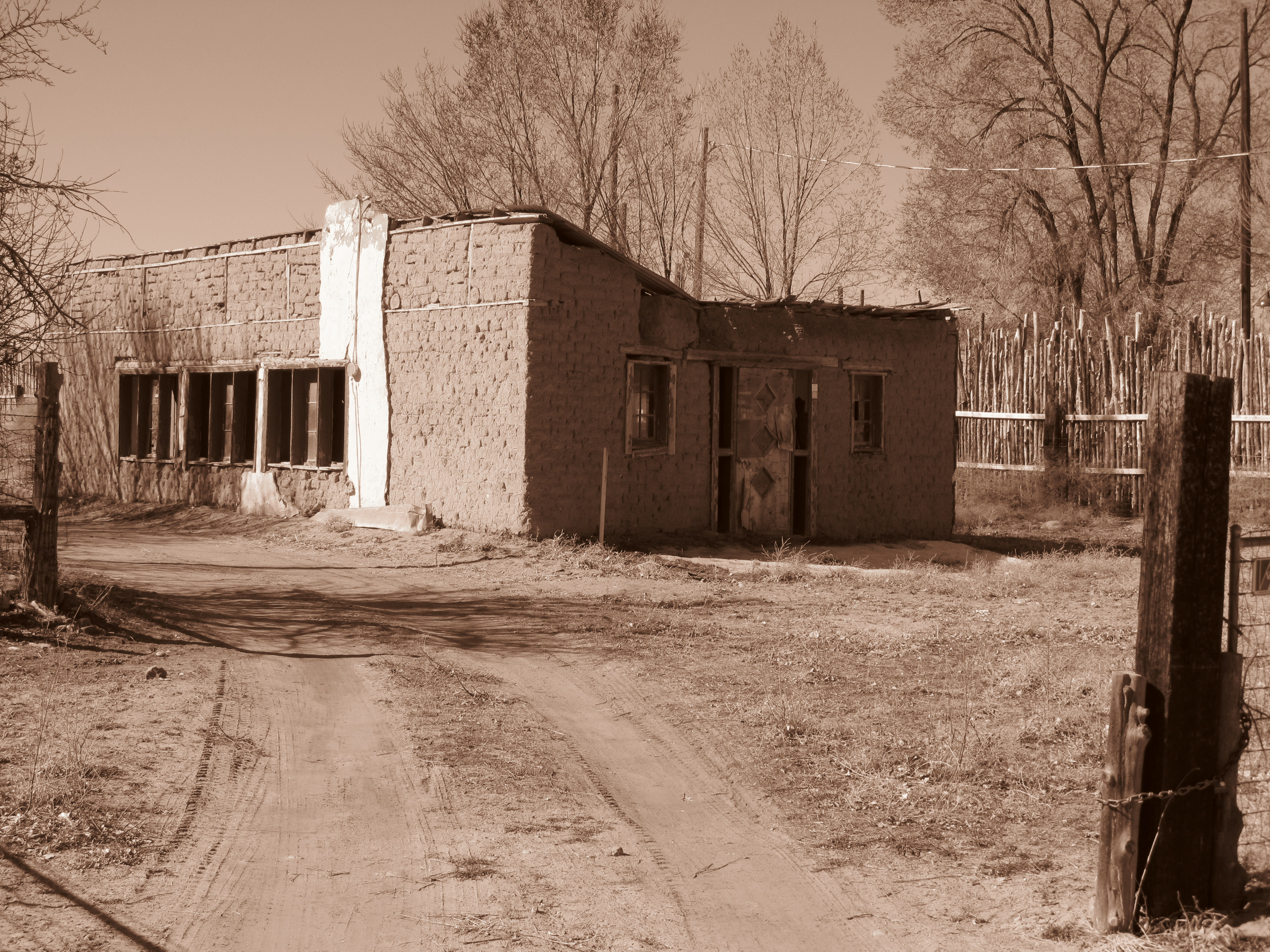
The Old Ojo Caliente Hot Springs Hotel

== See also ==
- List of hot springs in the United States
- List of hot springs in the world
