= Laureano Cordova Mill =

- U.S. National Register of Historic Places
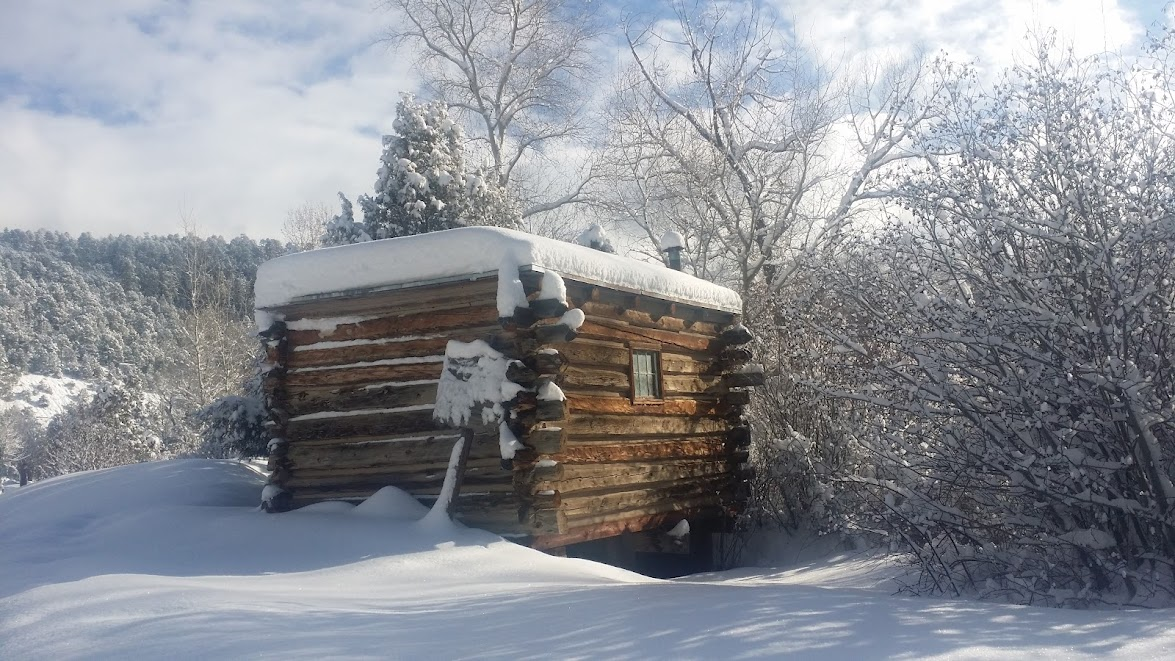

- Location within New Mexico Location within the United States
- Location: Off NM 75, Vadito, New Mexico
- Coordinates: 36°11′26″N 105°40′08″W
- Area: 0.1 acres (0.040 ha)
- Built: 1870
- Built by: Cordove, Acorsino
- Architectural style: Mexican
- NRHP reference No.: 74001212
- Added to NRHP: November 5, 1974

The Laureano Cordova Mill is a historic grinding mill located about 100 yards (91 m) south of New Mexico State Road 75 on the Rio Pueblo. It was listed on the National Register of Historic Places in 1974.

It was built in about 1870 in the style of the area's early Spanish settlers. Its grindstone is 30 inches (0.76 m) wide and powered by water from a ditch channeled off the Rio Pueblo.
