= Posi-ouinge =

- U.S. National Register of Historic Places
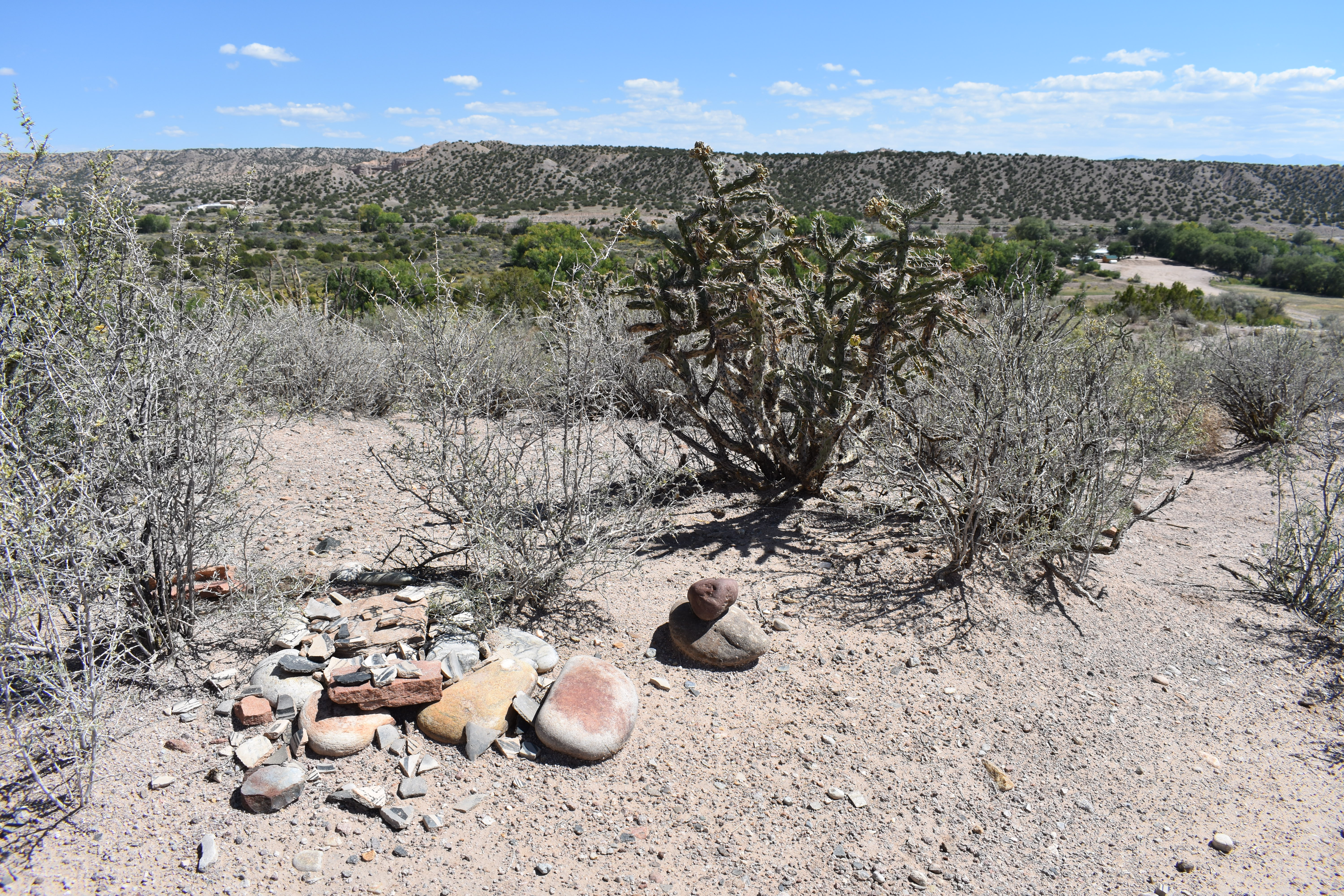

- Location within New Mexico
- Nearest city: Ojo Caliente, New Mexico
- Coordinates: 36°17′57″N 106°03′23″W
- Area: 23.5 acres (9.5 ha)
- MPS: Late Prehistoric Cultural Developments Along the Rio Chama and Tributaries MPS
- NRHP reference No.: 93000675
- Added to NRHP: August 5, 1993

Posi-ouinge (Tewa: P’osí Ówîngeh Kayyee, transl. 'moss-greenness ruin') (Note: Also seen as P’oeseewi Ówîngeh Kayyee, Pose-uingge) is an archeological site in Rio Arriba County, New Mexico and Taos County, New Mexico near Ojo Caliente. It was listed on the National Register of Historic Places in 1993 for its information potential. Located on the banks of the Rio Ojo Caliente at the site of Ojo Caliente, it is one of the principal Tewa Pueblo ancestral sites in New Mexico, with 13 kivas, and a prehistoric population of approximately 2,000.

Tewa oral history records that the hero P’oseyemu was born and dwelt at P’osí, and that it was where the Summer and Winter moities came together after migrating south from the Tewa homeland.

The Bureau of Land Management reports:

Posi-Ouinge, the 'Greenness Pueblo,' is a large prehistoric village dated to the 13th through the 16th centuries AD. The pueblo may have had well over 2,000 rooms, making it one of the largest in the southwest. The village was inhabited by Tewa Indians whose descendants now live near the Rio Grande in the Espanola area. The word 'Tewa' refers to a group of Puebloan inhabitants living along the northern Rio Grande and speaking a similar language. Today, the pueblo lies above the hot springs resort at Ojo Caliente. A short, self-guided hike beginning just west of the Mineral Spring Hotel takes you up onto the river terrace above and then around the site through room blocks and to vistas with beautiful views of the Ojo Caliente valley.

Access to the trail is behind the Ojo Caliente Mineral Springs Resort at 50 Los Banos Drive in Ojo Caliente.
