= Rio Ojo Caliente =

River in New Mexico, United States

Coordinates: 36°06′34″N 106°08′33″W

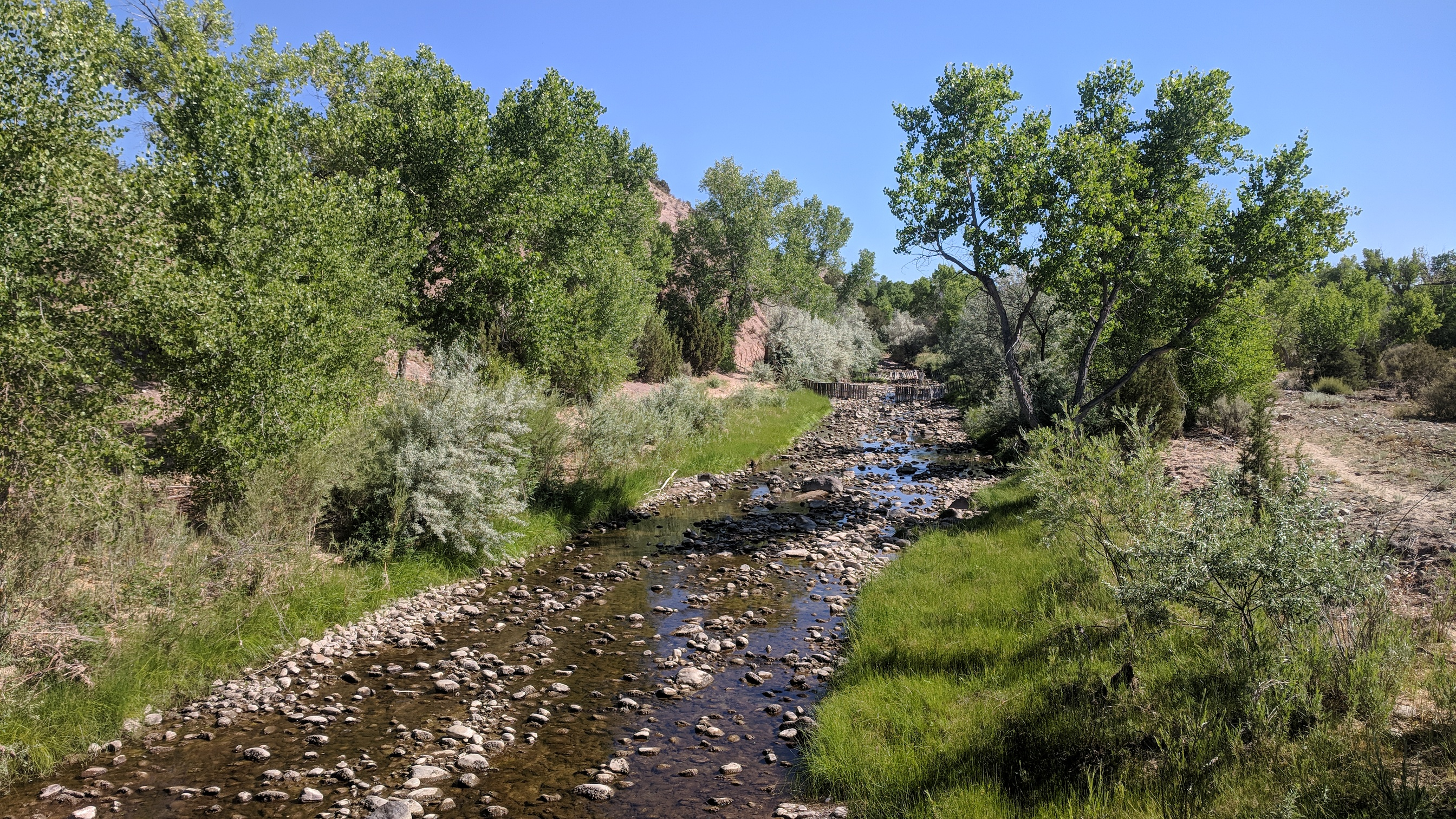
View of the Rio Ojo Caliente looking upstream from the bridge on the Ojo Caliente Mineral Springs Resort and Spa's bosque loop trail

The Rio Ojo Caliente (or Ojo Caliente River; Tewa: P'oeseewiˀ P'oe) is a tributary of the Rio Chama mostly in Rio Arriba County, New Mexico, with a small part near Ojo Caliente in Taos County.

== Course ==
From the confluence of the Rio Vallecitos and Rio Tusas near La Madera, it flows southeast through a small canyon before turning southwest and entering the Ojo Caliente Valley. From here the river parallels US Route 285 and flows past the town of Ojo Caliente, feeding acequias (small irrigation canals) along the way. South of the town, the Rio Ojo Caliente flows past Black Mesa, which separates its basin from that of the Rio Grande, before reaching its confluence with the Rio Chama near the town of Chile, just upstream from that river's confluence with the Rio Grande.

== See also ==
- List of rivers of New Mexico
