= Carson, New Mexico =

Unincorporated community in New Mexico, US

Coordinates: 36°21′52″N 105°45′55″W

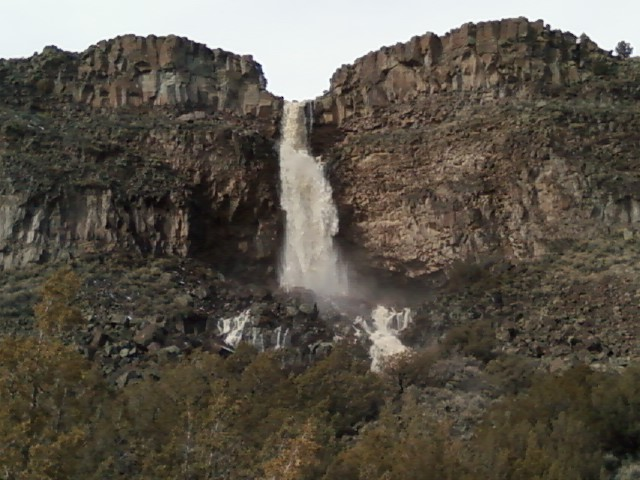
A seasonal wet-weather waterfall near Carson

Carson is an unincorporated community in southwestern Taos County, New Mexico, United States. Named after frontiersman and Taos resident Kit Carson, Carson was founded c. 1908, when the surrounding area was opened for homesteading. Carson is a low-density rural residential area.

Carson has a post office, with the ZIP code 87517. The 87517 ZIP Code Tabulation Area had a population of 158 at the 2000 census. The Carson ZCTA had 114 housing units; a land area of 35.03 sq. miles; a water area of 0 sq. miles; and a population density of 4.51 people per sq. mile at Census 2000.

In the 1930s, Carson was a struggling Mormon settlement. A local trader gave an old colcha, an embroidered woolen blanket, to his sister-in-law for repair. She studied the textile, and began making new colchas, starting a successful cottage industry. Most of the Carson colchas were made from recycled woolen fabrics. They were priced reasonably, and sold well. Many are now in museum collections.

Carson's website is www.carsonnm.org
