= Ojo Caliente, New Mexico =

Unincorporated community in Rio Arriba and Taos County, New Mexico, United States

Coordinates: 36.303°N 106.047°W

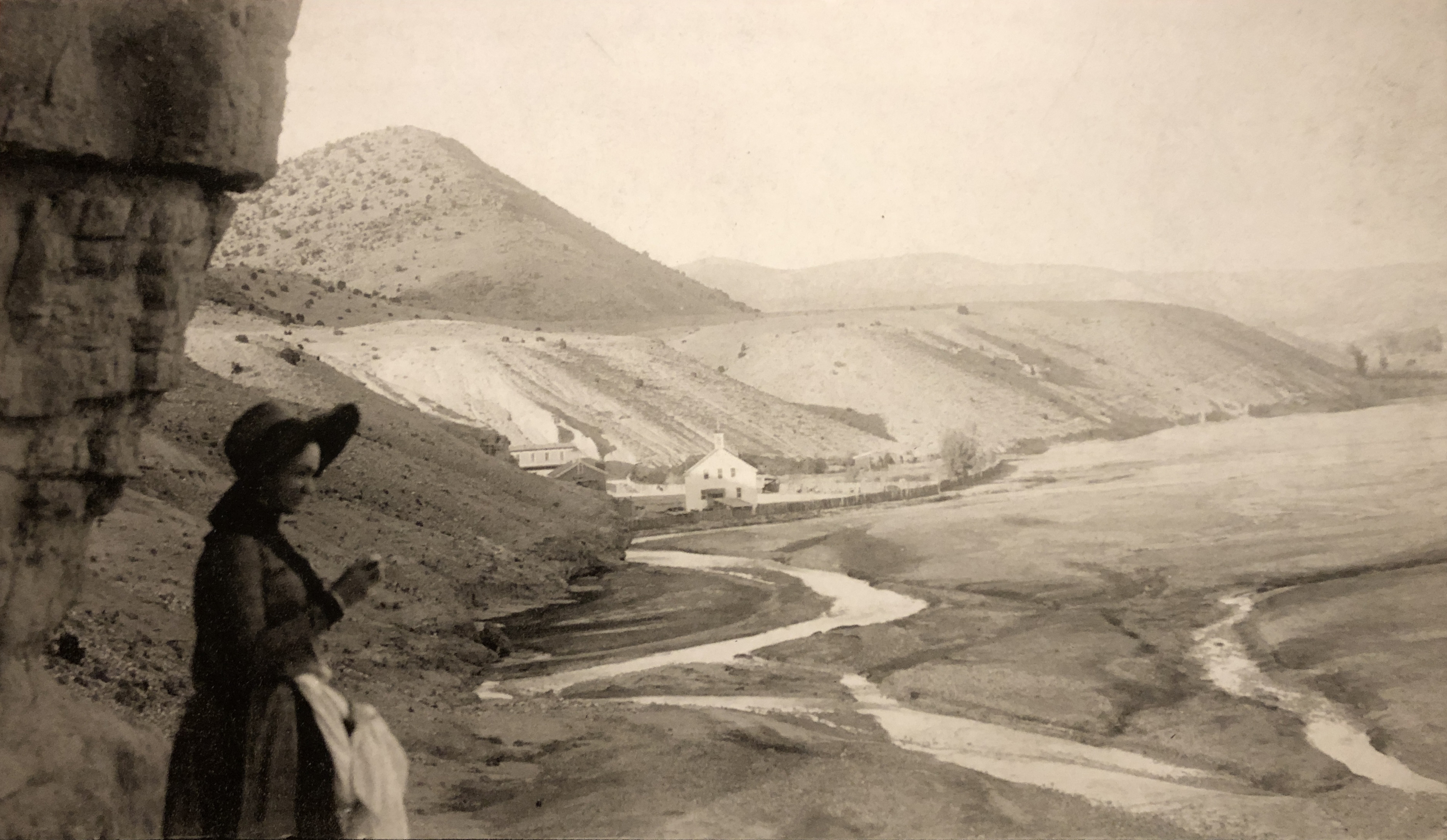
Looking up Caliente Rio at the Hot Springs, c. 1884–1892

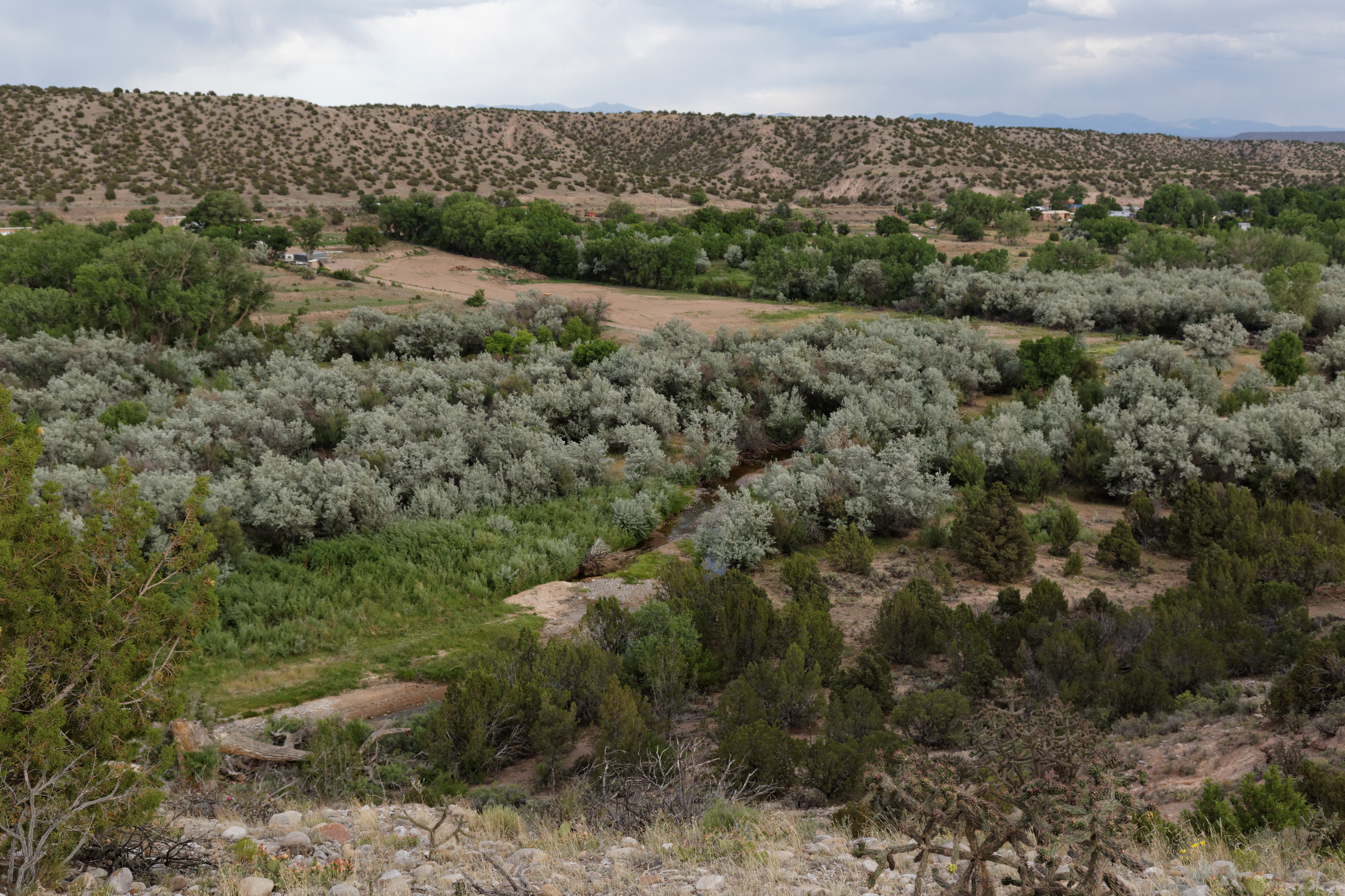
The valley and sparse settlement of Ojo Caliente. The gray-tinted trees are Russian Olives, an invasive species replacing native riparian cottonwoods.

Ojo Caliente, (Hot Spring, (Note: An incorrect translation to English is often "Hot Eye", but in Spanish the word Ojo means either spring or eye, and in this context it obviously means spring.) Tewa: Posí Búuˀu) is an unincorporated community in Taos County and Rio Arriba County, New Mexico, United States, along the Rio Ojo Caliente. As of the 2020 census, Ojo Caliente had a population of 135. The community is known for the Ojo Caliente Hot Springs, a health resort.

== Description and history ==
Ojo Caliente lies along U.S. Route 285 near the Rio Grande between Española and Taos, approximately 50 miles (80 km) north of Santa Fe, the state capital. The community consist mainly of small farms irrigated by acequias fed by water from the Rio Ojo Caliente. Ojo Caliente has an arid or semi-arid climate receiving an average of 11 in (280 mm) of precipitation annually. The community has an elevation of 6,300 ft (1,900 m).

Formerly the site of the Tewa settlement of Posi-ouinge, Ojo Caliente was settled sporadically as early as 1735 by a mixture of genizaros, detribalized Native Americans (or Indians) mostly descended from slaves, and Hispanos. They were settled on the frontier of New Mexico to guard against raids by Comanche and other Indigenous tribes. In 1754, the Spanish government of New Mexico made a Land Grant to genizaros to settle at Ojo Caliente. In 1766, Ojo Caliente had a fort for protection and imprisoned and fined any settlers who attempted to leave. In 1779, Governor Juan Bautista de Anza said that Ojo Caliente was deserted. In 1790, after a durable peace with the Comanche was reached, eighteen families from Bernalillo resettled Ojo Caliente.

In 1807, Major Zebulon Pike described Ojo Caliente as "a square enclosure of mud [adobe] walls, the houses forming the wall....Inside of the enclosure were the different streets of houses of the same fashion, all of one story...The population consisted of civilized Indians, but much mixed blood. Here we had a dance which is called the Fandango...the village may contain 500 souls. The greatest natural curiosity is the warm springs...each affords sufficient water for a mill seat."

The community, known for the Ojo Caliente Hot Springs, is one of the oldest health resorts in North America. Tewa tradition holds that its pools provided access to the underworld. Frank Mauro purchased the springs in 1932, and it remained a family business for three generations. The resort's buildings are on the National Register of Historic Places. The nearby Ojo Caliente Hot Springs Round Barn, built in 1924, is also listed on the National Register.
