= New Mexico State Road 75 =

State highway in New Mexico, United States

State Road 75

Route information
- Maintained by NMDOT
- Length: 20.547 mi (33.067 km)

Major junctions
- West end: NM 68 West of Dixon 1 mile
- NM 580 in Dixon; NM 76 in Picuris Pueblo; NM 73 in Peñasco
- East end: NM 518 West of Sipapu Ski Area 4.8 miles

Location
- Country: United States
- State: New Mexico
- Counties: Rio Arriba, Taos

Highway system
- New Mexico State Highway System; Interstate; US; State; Scenic
← NM 74	→ NM 76

New Mexico State Road 75 (NM 75) is a 20.6 mi (33.2 km) long state highway in Northern New Mexico, located in the Southwestern United States. NM 75 is located on the western slope of the Sangre de Cristo Mountains starting near the Rio Grande, passes through Pircuris Pueblo, and ends as a segment of the High Road to Taos near Peñasco.

== Route description ==
NM 75 begins west near Dixon at its intersection with NM 68 . The road then runs east through the mountain villages of Rio Lucio, Peñasco, and Vadito, before reaching its eastern terminus at intersection of NM 518 4.8 miles west of Sipapu Ski Area. Starting at the intersection of NM 76, NM 75 is a segment of the High Road to Taos for 7 miles until the intersection with NM 518.

NM 7 is a mountainous two-lane undivided highway with few passing lanes. It is relatively straight with few switchbacks. The road begins at 5,900-foot (1,800 m) elevation and climbs steadily to 7,500-foot (2,285 m). The speed limit is maximum 55-mile-per-hour (90 km/h), stretches of 50-mile-per-hour (80 km/h), and as low as 25-mile-per-hour (40 km/h) in the villages. NM 7 can be treacherous during winter conditions.

== Major intersections ==
County	Location	mi	km	Destinations	Notes
Rio Arriba	Dixon	0.000	0.000	NM 68	Western terminus
Rio Arriba	Dixon	3.301	5.312	NM 580 east – Cañoncito	Western terminus of NM 580
Taos	Picuris Pueblo	13.662	21.987	NM 76 south – Truchas	Northern terminus of NM 76, begin segment of the High Road to Taos
Taos	Peñasco	15.180	24.430	NM 73 east – Rodarte	Western terminus of NM 73
Taos	Vadito	20.547	33.067	NM 518	Eastern terminus, end segment of the High Road to Taos
1.000 mi = 1.609 km; 1.000 km = 0.621 mi

== Gallery ==
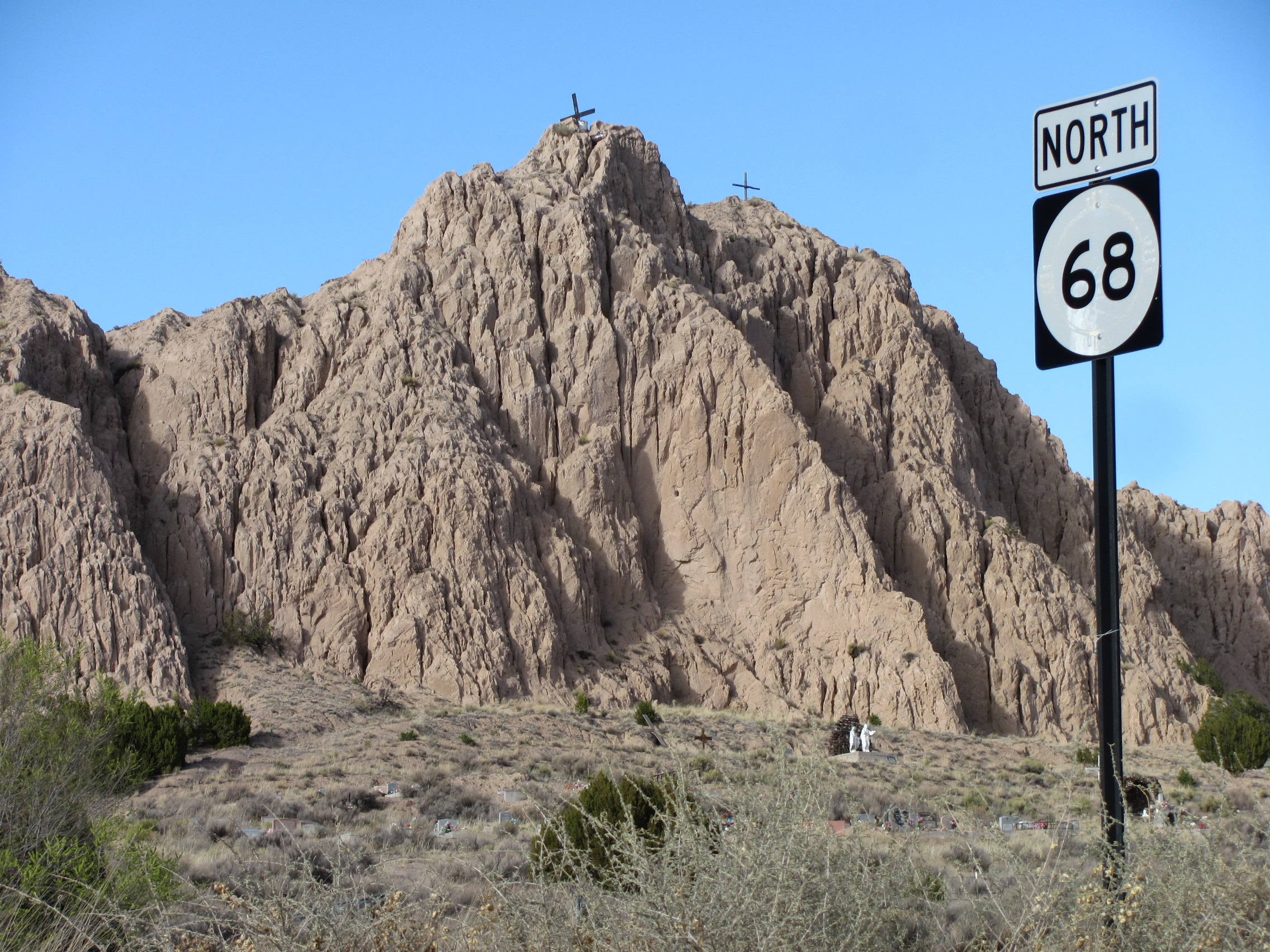
Barrancos Blancos at the intersection of NM Route 68 and NM Route 75

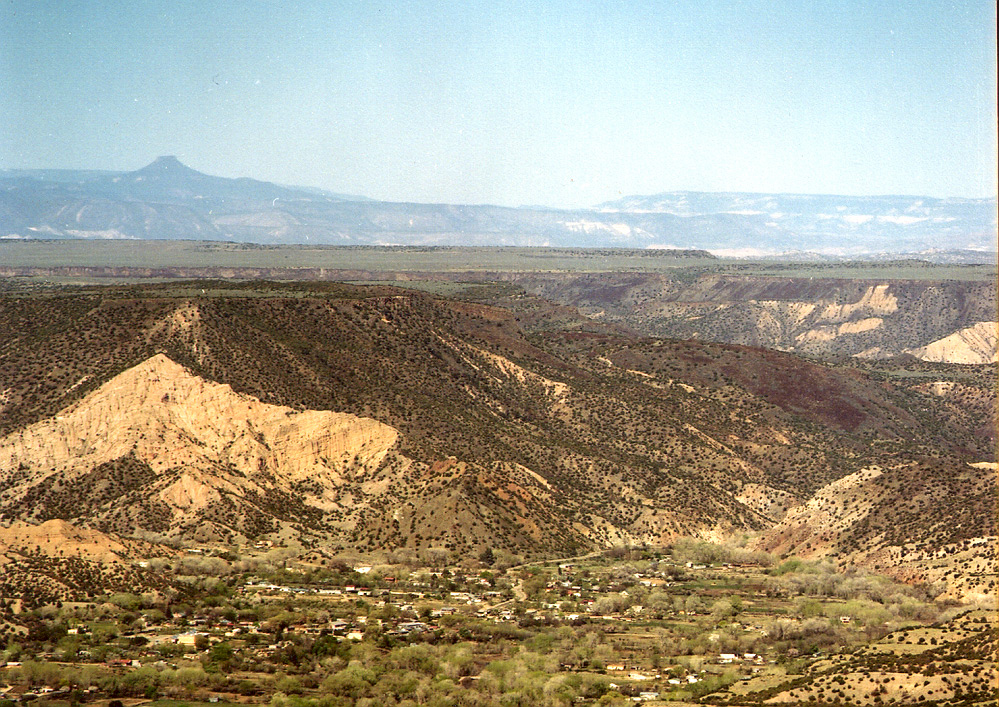
Dixon, New Mexico. View looking west. Cerro Pedernal is the flat peak on the horizon left.

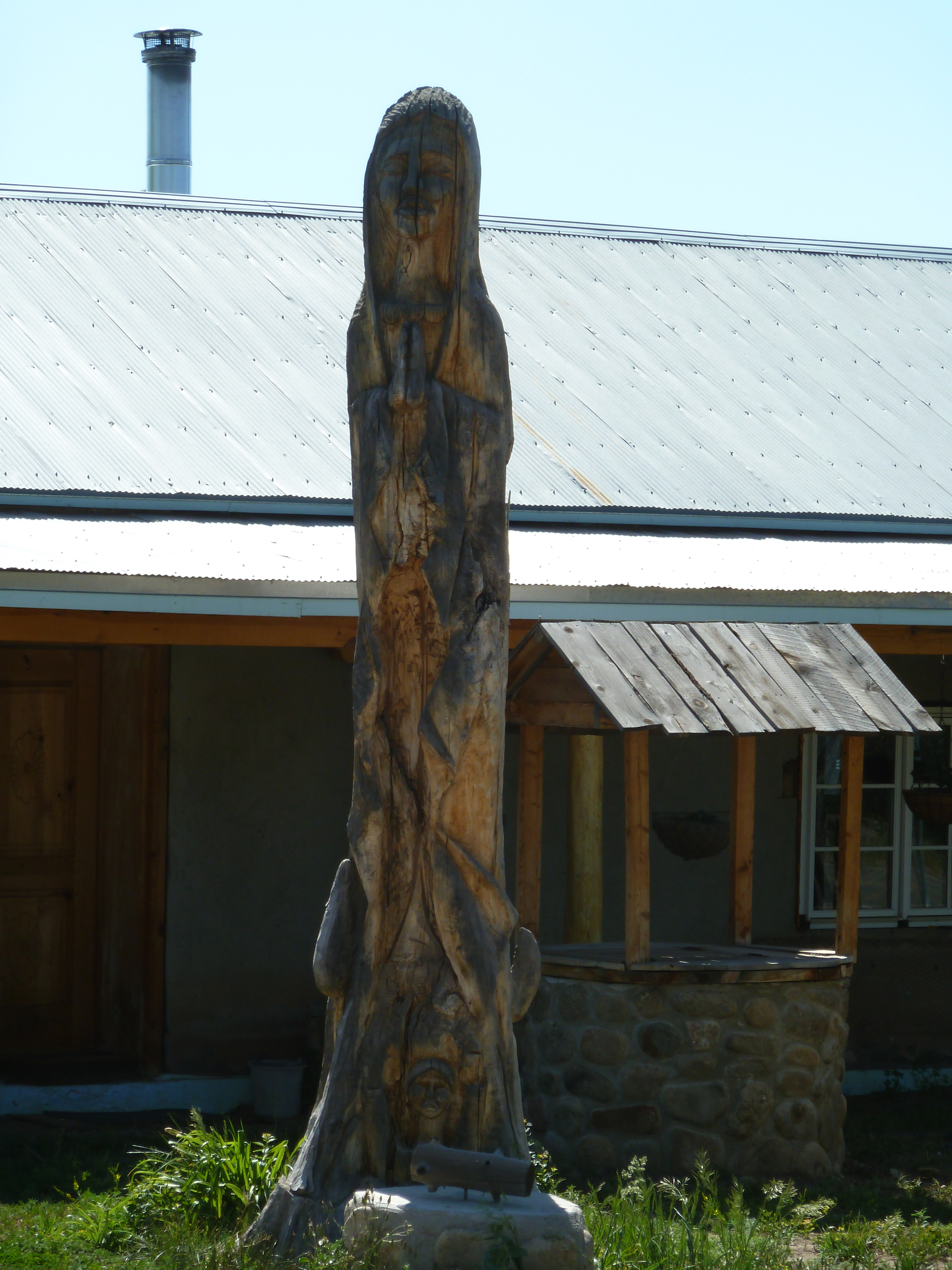
Carved tree trunk, Peñasco, New Mexico

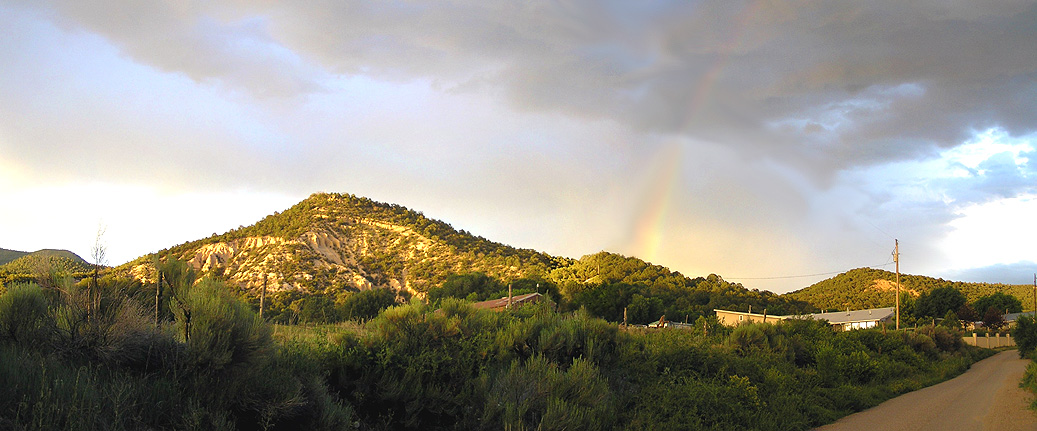
Rainbow over Vadito, New Mexico
