= New Mexico State Road 240 =

State highway in Taos County, New Mexico, United States

State Road 240
- NM 240 highlighted in red

Route information
- Maintained by NMDOT
- Length: 6.185 mi (9.954 km)

Major junctions
- South end: NM 68 in Ranchos De Taos
- North end: NM 68 in Taos

Location
- Country: United States
- State: New Mexico
- Counties: Taos

Highway system
- New Mexico State Highway System; Interstate; US; State; Scenic
← NM 239	→ NM 241

State Road 240 (NM 240) is a 6.185-mile (9.954 km) state highway in Taos County, New Mexico, United States, that is a northwestern loop off New Mexico State Road 68 (NM 68) from Ranchos De Taos to Taos.

== Route description ==
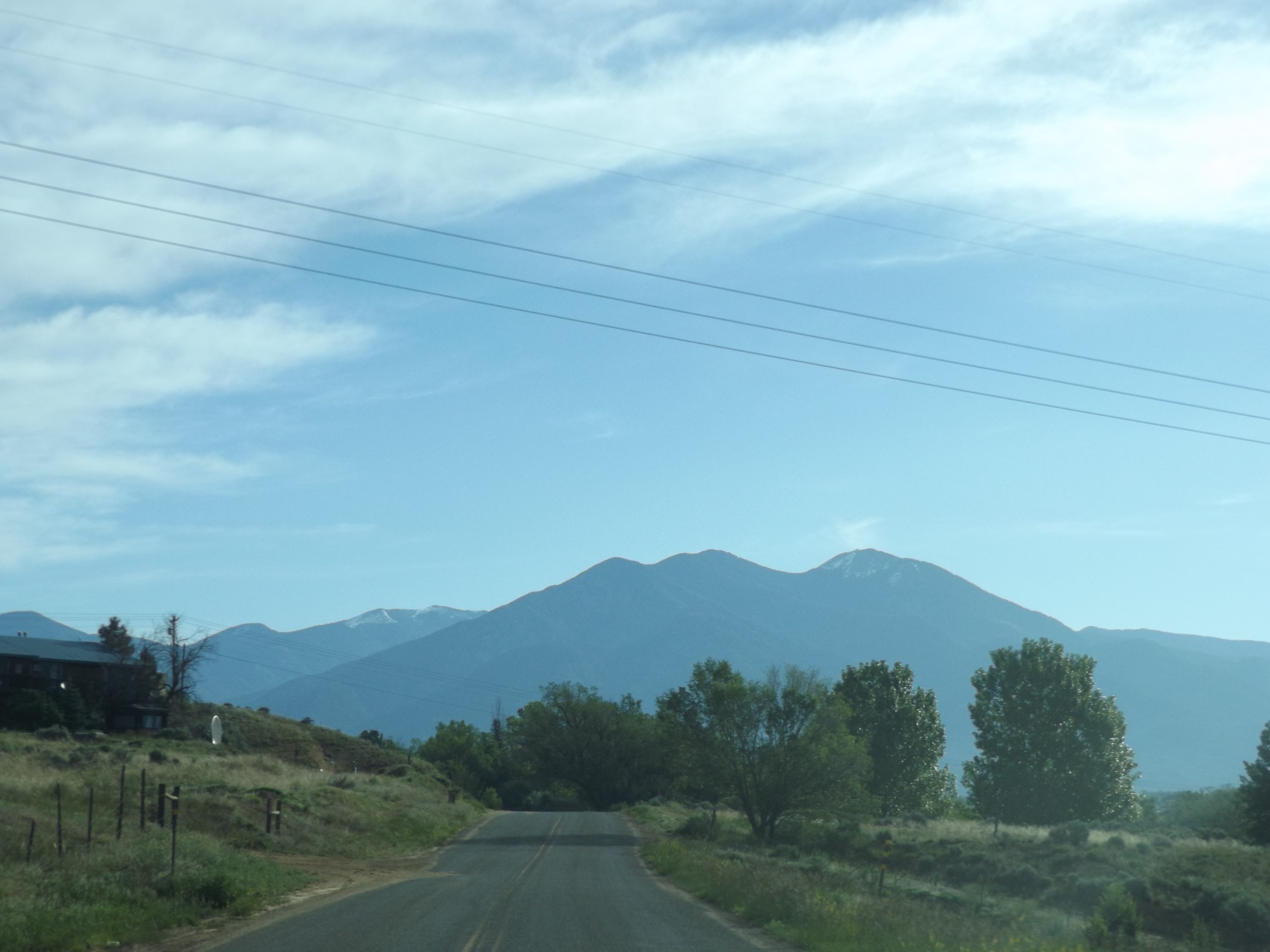
NM 240 with mountains in the background, June 2015

NM 240 begins at a signal–controlled intersection with NM 68 (Pasao Del Pueblo Sur) in the western part of the census-designated place of Ranchos De Taos, immediately north of the Ranchos De Taos Post Office. (NM 68 heads north into Taos to connect with the northern terminus NM 240 before ending at U.S. Route 64 [US 64]. NM 68 heads southerly toward Llano Quemado, Velarde, Española, and Santa Fe. From the intersection at the southern terminus of NM 240, San Francisco Road heads briefly southeast to end at Espinoza Road.) From its southern terminus, NM 240 heads north–northwesterly as a two–lane road, running a bit northeast of and roughly parallel with the Rio Grande del Rancho. After connecting with the north end of Calle Martinez, the northeast ends of Garica and Josie Martinez roads, and the southwest end of Calle Madrid, NM 240 runs very briefly along the east bank of the Rio Grande del Rancho.

NM 240 then leaves Ranchos De Taos and connects with the northeast end of Tom Holder Road and the southwest ends of Calle Del Medio and Calle Tio Miguel. About 2.3 miles (3.7 km) from its southern terminus, NM 240 makes a sharp turn to head west and abruptly reaches a T intersection with the east end of Los Cordovas Road. Heading northerly from that intersection, NM 240 connects with the west end of Riversong Ranch road, crosses the Rio Pueblo de Taos (a bit upstream from its confluence with the Rio Grande del Rancho), and connects with the east end of Camino De La Culebra road, before making a hard turn to the east.

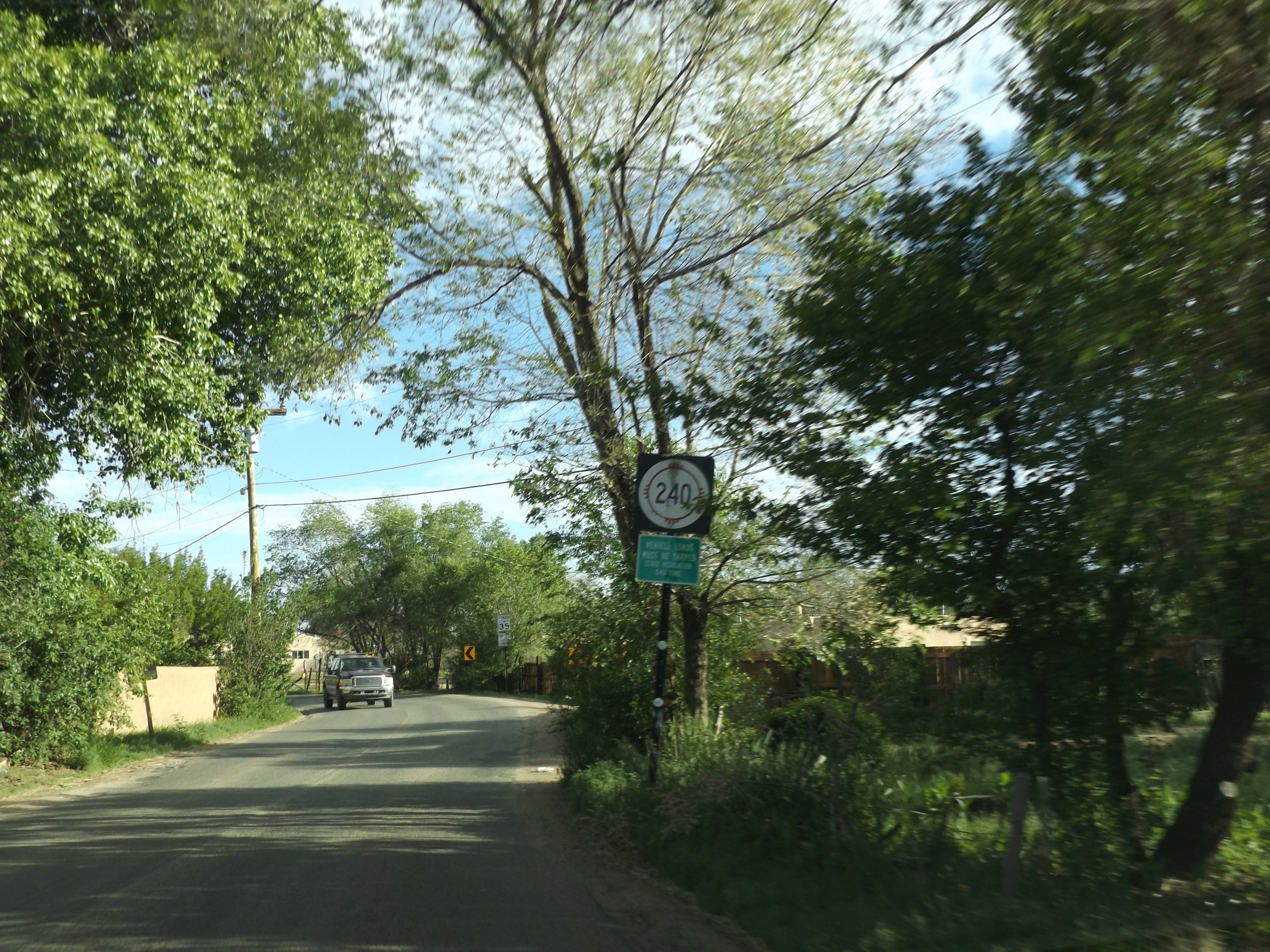
NM 240 shield, near the southern terminus of the state road, June 2015

Promptly after its sharp turn to the east, NM 240 heads east–northeasterly (running a bit north of and roughly parallel with the Rio Pueblo De Taos) and promptly connects with the south end of Blueberry Hill Road. About 0.6 miles (0.97 km) later NM 240 connects with the southeast end of Blueberry Bluff road and then the southeast end of Cottom Road, just as the state road crosses over the Acequia Madre del Prado. After the canal crossing, NM 240 jogs very briefly to the southeast before connecting with the north end of Rafael Road and resuming its east–northeasterly course. Approximately one-half mile (0.80 km) later, NM 240 crosses over the Rio Pueblo De Taos again. After connecting with the north end of Callejon Road, crossing Hacienda Road/Adrienne Lane, NM 240 connects with north ends of Pacheco, Duran, and Francisco lanes. After crossing Don Robert road/Francisco Vigil and Christina Garcia lanes (the two lanes join at their northern ends at their intersection with NM 240), the state road connects with the north end of Tino Lane and then the south end of Camino De Liebre before crossing Lavadia Lane/La Vega Lane. After connecting with the south end of Upper Ranchitos Road, NM 240 heads easterly, diverging from the northeasterly upstream course of the Rio Pueblo De Taos. Roughly one-half mile (0.80 km) to the east, NM 240 enters the city of Taos.

Within the city of Taos, NM 240 continues heading easterly and connects with the south end of Carabajal Road, the north end of La Posta Road, both ends of Ranchitos Road (which forms a small loop to the north), and the south end of Valverde Street. NM 240 then connects with the north ends of Jeantete and Peralta roads and the north end of Satistevan Lane, followed by the east ends of Ribak, Valdez, and Elidio lanes. NM 240 then crosses San Antonio Street/Salazar Road at a signal–controlled intersection. After connecting with east end of Ledoux Street (with forms a short southern loop off the state road), the south ends of Padre Martinez Lane and Dona Luz Street, NM 240 promptly reaches a signal–controlled T intersection with Camino De La Placita. At that intersection, NM 240 turns southeast to run along Camino De La Placita and connect with the east ends of Ledoux and Comanche streets, before reaching its northern terminus at its northern junction with NM 68 (Pasao Del Pueblo Sur) at signal–controlled intersection. (NM 68 heads briefly north before ending at US 64 in Taos Plaza; US 64 continues westerly toward Taos Pueblo, El Prado, and Tres Piedras. NM 68 heads south as Pasao Del Pueblo Sur toward Ranchos De Taos and the southern terminus of NM 240. From the intersection at the northern terminus of NM 24, Quesnel Street heads briefly east as a one-way [eastbound] road to end at US 64 [Kit Carson Road].)

== Traffic ==
Annual average daily traffic history (Note: Annual average daily traffic history reflects the highest reported traffic for all sections of the highway. The section with highest reported traffic may vary from year to year and may be affected by additions to and deletions from the highway, as well as highway realignments.)

Annual average daily traffic
Year	AADT
2020	
2019	
2018	
2017	
2016	
2015	3,963
2014	3,573
2013	3,546

The New Mexico Department of Transportation (NMDOT) collects data for the State Roads and Local Federal-Aid roads. Traffic is measured in both directions and reported as Annual Average Daily Traffic (AADT). As of 2015, the highest traffic section along NM 240 (the southernmost 2.367 miles [3.809 km]) had an AADT of 3,963, with a nearly 12 percent increase over the previous two years. The lowest traffic section (the 2.367 miles [3.809 km] west of Upper Ranchitos Road) had an AADT of 1,044, with little change over the previous two year

== Major intersections ==
The entire route is in Taos County.

Location	mi	km	Destinations	Notes
Ranchos De Taos	0.000	0.000	San Francisco Road south	Continuation south beyond southern terminus
Ranchos De Taos	0.000	0.000	NM 68 east (Pasao Del Pueblo Sur) – Taos NM 68 west (Pasao Del Pueblo Sur) – Llano Quemado, Velarde, Española, Santa Fe	Southern terminus
Taos	6.185	9.954	NM 68 east (Pasao Del Pueblo Sur) – US 64 NM 68 west (Pasao Del Pueblo Sur) – Ranchos De Taos	Northern terminus
Taos	6.185	9.954	Quesnel Street east	One-way continuation east beyond northern terminus
1.000 mi = 1.609 km; 1.000 km = 0.621 mi: Incomplete access

== See also ==
- List of state roads in New Mexico
