= New Mexico State Road 585 =

State highway in Taox County, New Mexico, United States

State Road 585
- Paseo Del Cañon East
- NM 585 highlighted in red

Route information
- Maintained by NMDOT
- Length: 2.204 mi (3.547 km)
- Existed: 1988–present

Major junctions
- West end: NM 68 in Taos
- East end: US 64 east of Taos

Location
- Country: United States
- State: New Mexico
- Counties: Taos

Highway system
- New Mexico State Highway System; Interstate; US; State; Scenic
← NM 584	→ NM 592

State Road 585 (NM 585) is a 2.2-mile (3.5 km) state highway in Taos County, New Mexico, United States, that runs along Paseo Del Cañon East and connects New Mexico State Road 68 (NM 68) in Taos with U.S. Route 64 (US 64) east of Taos.

== Route description ==
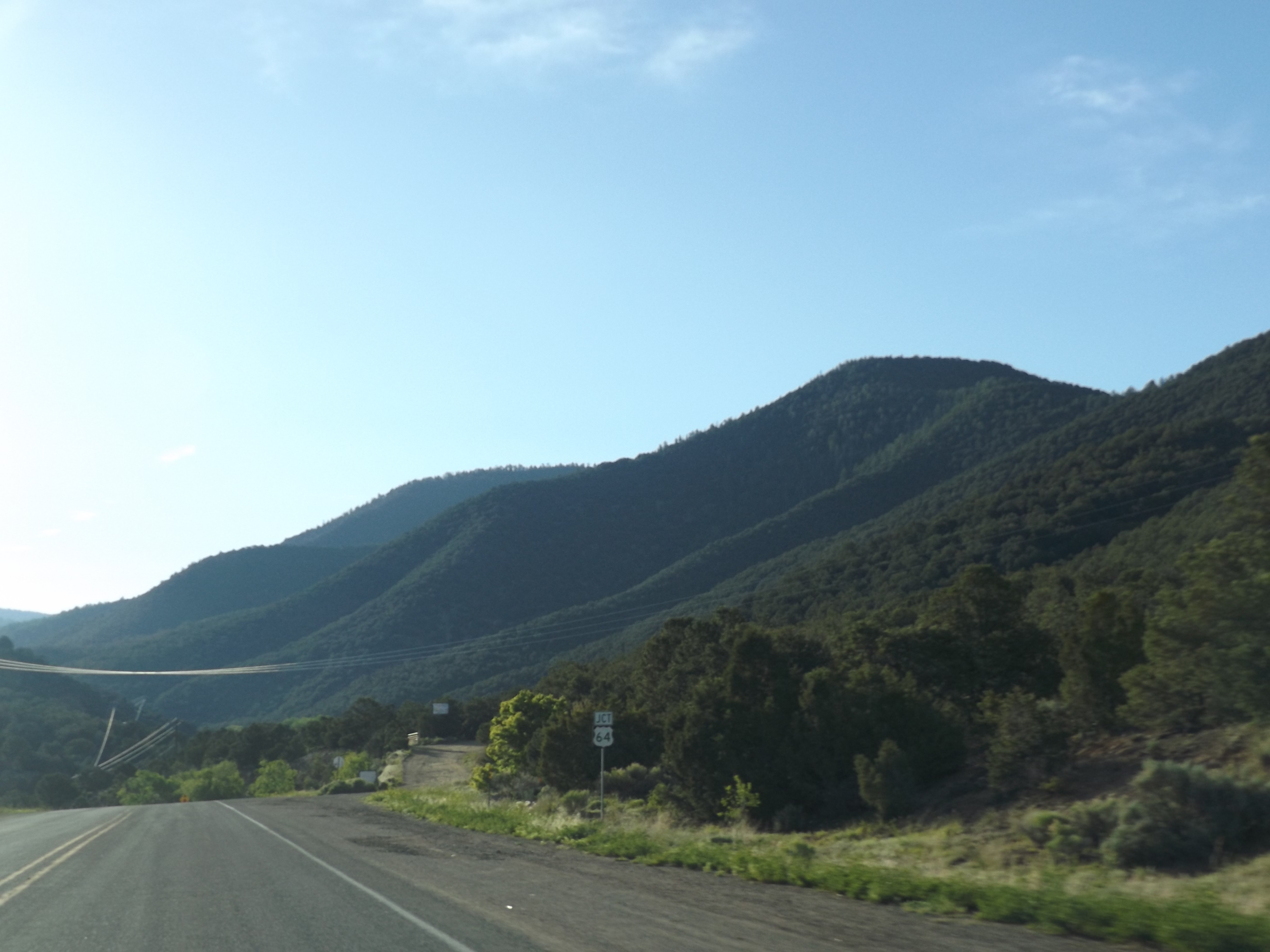
East along NM 585, toward its eastern terminus at U.S. Route 64, June 2015

NM 585 begins at a traffic light–controlled intersection with NM 68 (Paseo Del Pueblo Sur) in southwestern Taos, immediately north of the Taos Visitor Center. (From the intersection Paseo Del Cañon West heads westerly for about one mile [1.6 km] to end at Cam Del Medio. NM 68 heads north–northeast to end at US 64 in northern Taos. NM 68 heads southwesterly toward Ranchos De Taos, Velarde, and Española.) From its western terminus NM 585 heads southeast as a four–lane divided highway for about 0.2 miles (0.32 km) to a roundabout with Gusdorf Road. Curving slightly to the north, it continues east–southeast for about another 0.3 miles (0.48 km) to a roundabout with the north (west) end of Weimer Road. (Weimer Road forms a southern loop off of NM 585.) After the westbound lanes (only) connect with the west end of Calle Palomita, NM 585 has another roundabout, this time with the south end of Camino de Colores.

Heading east from its third roundabout, NM 585 narrows to a two–lane road before connecting with the south end of Camino De La Cruz. After continuing east for about one-half mile (0.80 km) NM 585 crossed Cruz Alta Road/Weimer Road, with Cruz Alta Road on the north and the north (east) end of Weimer Road on the south. After about another 0.4 miles (0.64 km), NM 585 leaves Taos and enters an unincorporated area of Taos County. About 0.2 miles (0.32 km) farther east, NM 585 curves to head northeast before connecting with the east end of Witt Road. Promptly thereafter, reaches its eastern terminus at US 64 at a T intersection. (US 64 heads east toward Angel Fire, Eagle Nest, and Raton.)

== History ==
NM 585 was created in 1988 as a renumbering of a spur of NM 68.

== Major intersections ==
The entire route is in Taos County.

Location	mi	km	Destinations	Notes
Taos	0.000	0.000	Paseo Del Cañon West west	Continuation west beyond western terminus
Taos	0.000	0.000	NM 68 east (Paseo Del Pueblo Sur) – US 60 NM 68 west (Paseo Del Pueblo Sur) – Ranchos De Taos, Velarde, Española	Western terminus
	2.204	3.547	US 64 east – Angel Fire, Eagle Nest, Raton US 64 west – Taos, Rio Grande Gorge Bridge, Tres Piedras	Eastern terminus: T intersection
1.000 mi = 1.609 km; 1.000 km = 0.621 mi

== See also ==
- List of state roads in New Mexico
