= Sipapu Ski & Summer Resort =

Ski resort in New Mexico, United States

Sipapu
- Location in New Mexico Sipapu (the United States)
- Location: Taos County, New Mexico, USA
- Nearest city: Vadito, New Mexico (postal address)
- Coordinates: 36.154211°N 105.548508°W
- Vertical: 1,055 ft (322 m)
- Top elevation: 9,255 ft (2,821 m)
- Base elevation: 8,200 ft (2,500 m)
- Skiable area: 215 acres (87 ha)
- Trails: 41: 20% beginner; 40% intermediate; 25% advanced; 15% expert
- Lift capacity: 6 lifts: 2 triple lifts, 1 quad lift, 3 surface lifts
- Terrain parks: 4
- Snowfall: 185 in (4,700 mm)
- Website: sipapunm.com

Sipapu Ski & Summer Resort, commonly known as Sipapu, is a small, year-round ski resort in Taos County, New Mexico, United States. It sits along New Mexico State Road 518 near Vadito in the Sangre de Cristo Mountains, about 20 miles southeast of Taos and roughly two hours’ drive north of Albuquerque. It was founded in 1952 by Lloyd and Olive Bolander, it was the first lift-served ski area in New Mexico. The resort operates under a special use permit from the Carson National Forest. The resort is owned and operated by Mountain Capital Partners.

Sipapu is home to New Mexico's longest ski season, from November to April. It is often the first resort to open and the last to close. The peak elevation is 9,255 ft (2,821 m), giving it a vertical drop of 1,055 feet (322 m). The resort reports 215 acres of skiable terrain. There are 44 trails and 6 lifts. Trails are 20% beginner, 40% intermediate, 25% advanced, and 15% expert. Six lifts serve the mountain: one quad chairlift, two triple chairlifts, one double lift, and two magic carpets.

The resort features cabins, hotel accommodations, a general store, gas, and restaurants. In the summer, the resort offers a free disc golf course on the mountain. It also offers hiking, fishing on the Rio Pueblo, geocaching, and offers its facilities for weddings. It is located in the Carson National Forest, about 20 miles south-southeast of Taos, New Mexico and 53 miles north of Las Vegas, NM. The resort has submitted a plan to the forest service for expansion, which may be viewed at the Sipapu website at www.sipapu.ski.

Sipapu participates in the Power Pass program which includes 11 ski areas and resorts around the Four Corners of the Southwestern United States.
