= Embudo, New Mexico =

Unincorporated community in Rio Arriba County, New Mexico, United States

- Unincorporated community
- Location within the state of New Mexico Location within the United States
- Coordinates: 36°12′27″N 105°57′40″W
- Country: United States
- State: New Mexico
- County: Rio Arriba
- Elevation: 5,824 ft (1,775 m)
- Time zone: UTC-7 (Mountain (MST))
  - Summer (DST): UTC-6 (MDT)
- GNIS feature ID: 915823
- Embudo Historic District
- U.S. National Register of Historic Places
- U.S. Historic district
- NM State Register of Cultural Properties
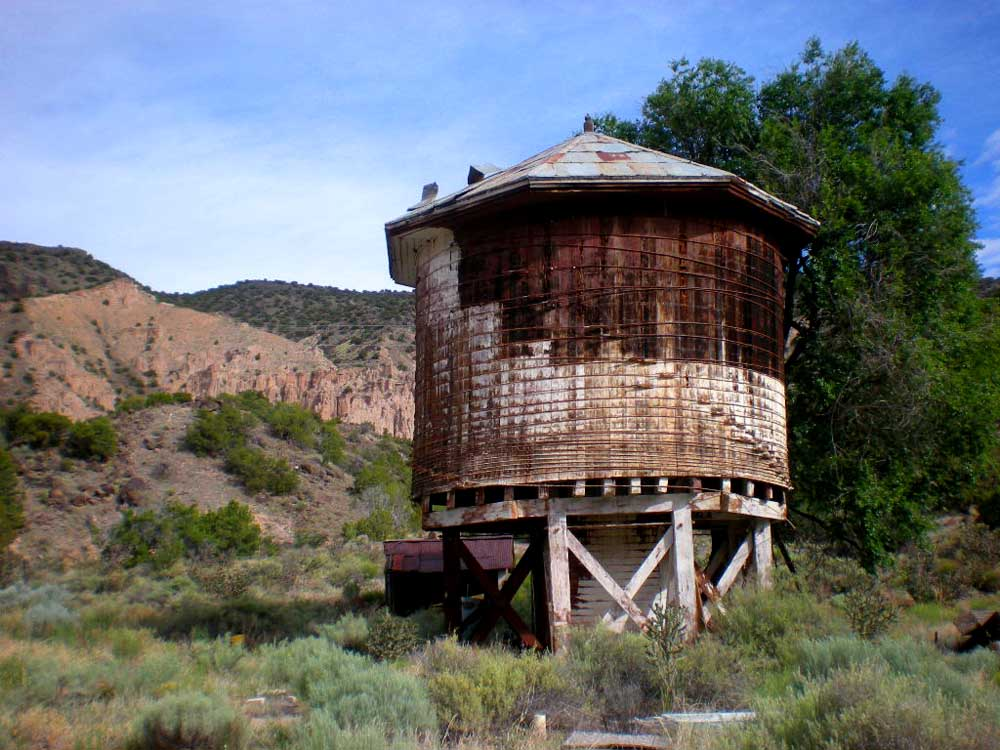
- Old railroad water tower at the Embudo Station

- Location within New Mexico
- Location: New Mexico State Road 68, Embudo, New Mexico
- Area: 18 acres (7.3 ha)
- Built: 1880
- NRHP reference No.: 79001547
- NMSRCP No.: 485
Significant dates
- Added to NRHP: March 12, 1979
- Designated NMSRCP: January 20, 1977

Embudo (also Embudo Station) is an unincorporated community in Rio Arriba County, New Mexico, United States. The community is within the Rio Grande Gorge and runs along both sides of the Rio Grande.near where the Embudo Creek (Rio Embudo) flows into the Rio Grande, encompassing the communities of La Bolsa and Rinconada and ending at the Taos County Line.

== Etymology ==
The name "Embudo", meaning "funnel" in Spanish, was given to the area by early Spanish settlers because the Rio Embudo flowed through a narrow pass which reminded them of a funnel.

== History ==
Embudo was founded in 1881 when the Denver and Rio Grande railroad opened a station (depot) there on its Chili Line. The station was named after the village San Antonio de Embudo, located two miles up the Embudo Creek, and until 1902 the communities shared a post office and were known jointly as Embudo. In 1900, anticipating a separate post office in the village, San Antonio de Embudo changed its name to Dixon after the Presbyterian missionary Dixon, who established a mission there. When the Dixon post office opened in 1902, however, Embudo lost its post office. Embudo got a post office again in 1905, only to lose it in 1909. In 1914, Embudo once again had its own post office, zip code 87531, but the building was removed in 2016, and mailboxes were transferred to the Dixon post office.

The railroad stop was at the bottom of Barranca Hill, where the line began its steep and twisting climb out of the Rio Grande Gorge, rising 1128 ft (371m) in 7.5 miles (12.1 km) of mostly 4% gradient to Barranca. The station was scheduled as the meeting point for the north- and south-bound mixed trains, and an adjacent restaurant made a mid-day meal available for passengers. The presence of both trains also made it possible, when necessary, to use both locomotives to double-head the northbound train to the top of the Gorge.

Embudo Hospital was established in 1915 as a cottage hospital, supported by a local Presbyterian mission. In a region with sparse medical support it quickly expanded; by 1944 it was serving an estimated population of 36,000 people in a land area area equivalent to the state of Massachusetts. Admissions continued to climb into the early 1960’s, and then declined as other hospitals expanded in Española, Taos and Los Alamos. In 1974, Presbyterian Healthcare Services handed the hospital over to the non‐profit Embudo Valley Health Facility, which continues to provide primary medical care.

The United States Geological Survey (USGS) established the Embudo Stream Gauging Station here, to measure the flow of the Rio Grande. This was the first USGS stream gauging station and was established by John Wesley Powell in 1888. Embudo was also the first USGS training center for hydrographers.

== Transport links ==
Today, from the state road a concrete bridge, replacing the old wooden bridge, crosses the Rio Grande to the "Embudo Historic District" which consists of the old railway station and associated buildings.

Embudo is on New Mexico State Road 68, beginning at Embudo Station located 2.9 miles (4.7 km) south of the intersection of New Mexico State Road 75. It was previously on U.S. Route 64 (US 64), a major national east-west highway and the main route between Santa Fe and Taos. In 1965, upon completion of the Rio Grande Gorge Bridge US 64 was realigned to end at Teec Nos Pos, Arizona rather than Santa Fe, bypassing Embudo.

== Notable people ==
- Casimiro Barela, Colorado politician
- Susan K. Herrera, member of the New Mexico House of Representatives
- Raul Midón, musician
- Ra Paulette, cave sculptor

== Gallery ==
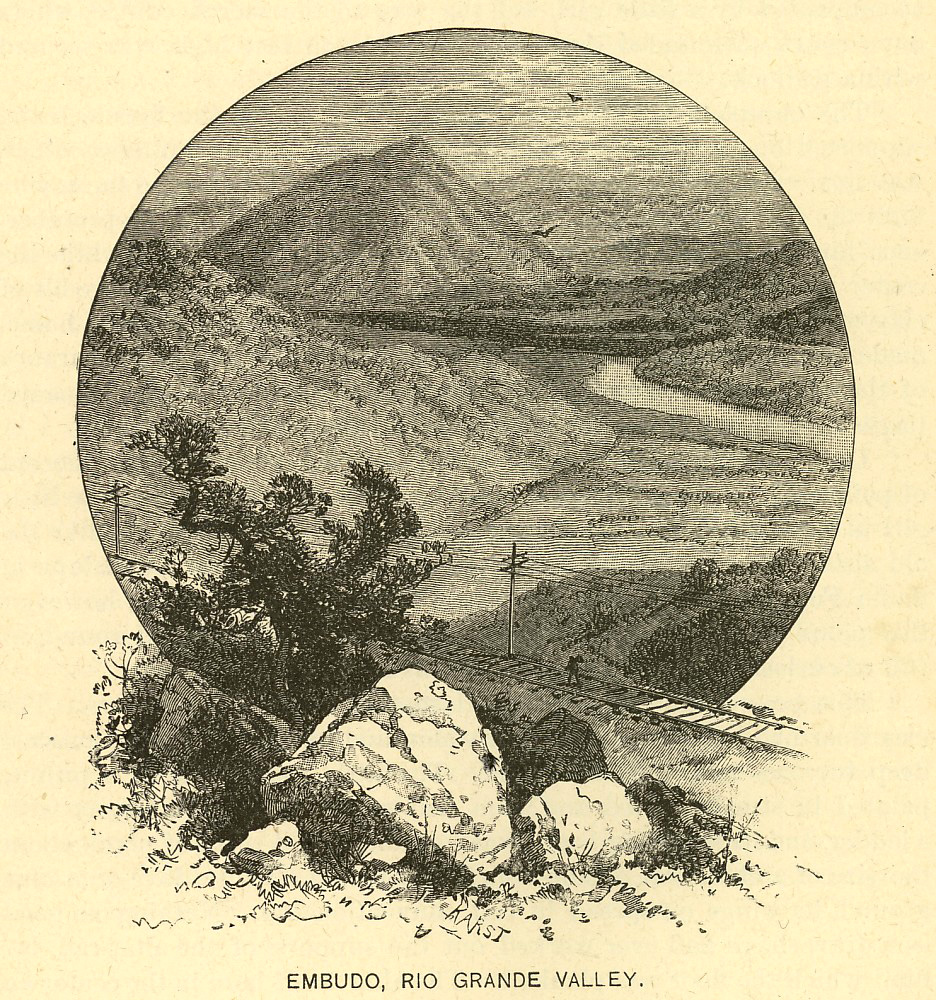
View of the mesa in 1885. The tracks for the Chili Line, now gone, can be seen in the foreground.

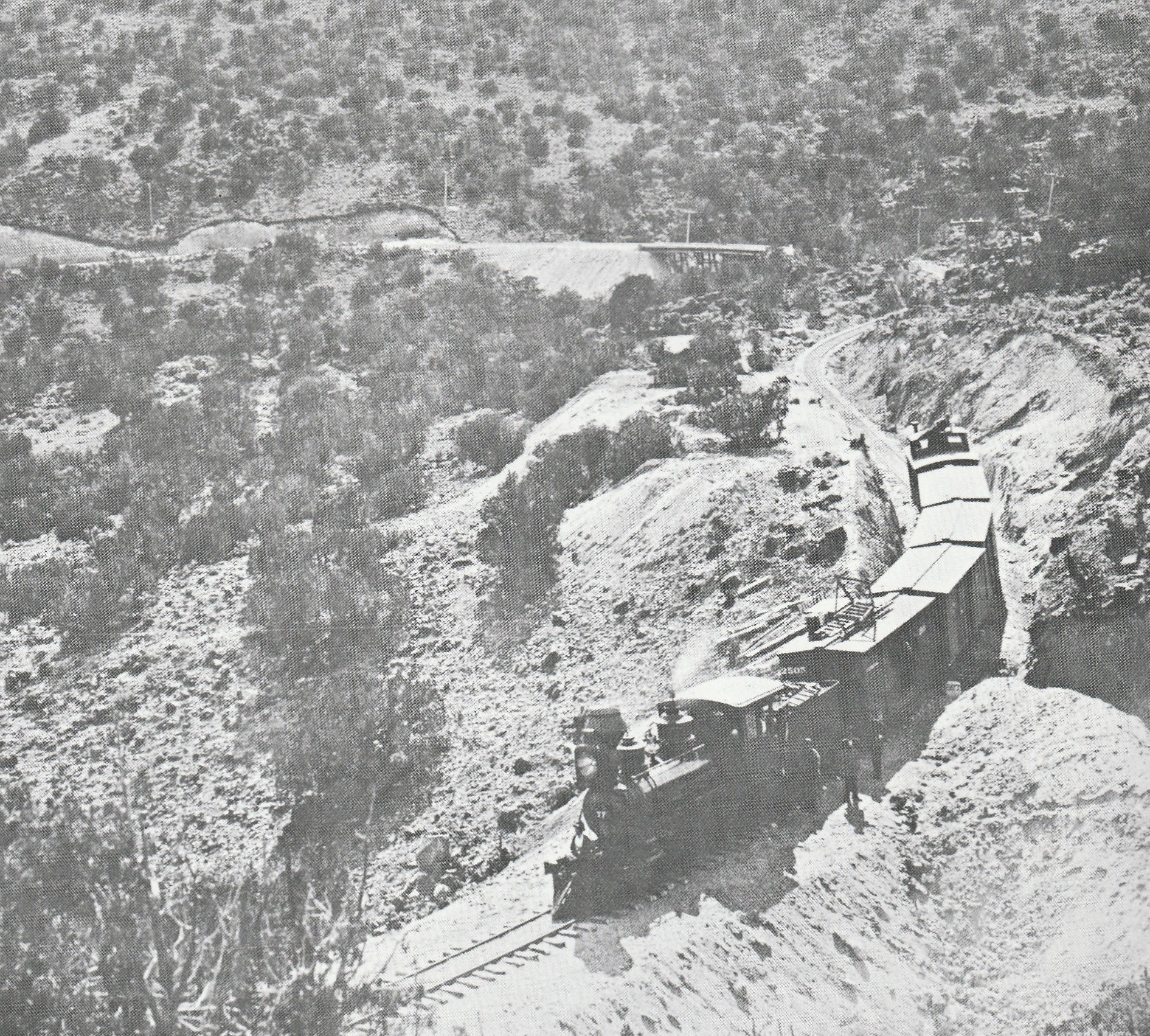
Freight train descending Barranca Hill, 1890 by W H Jackson

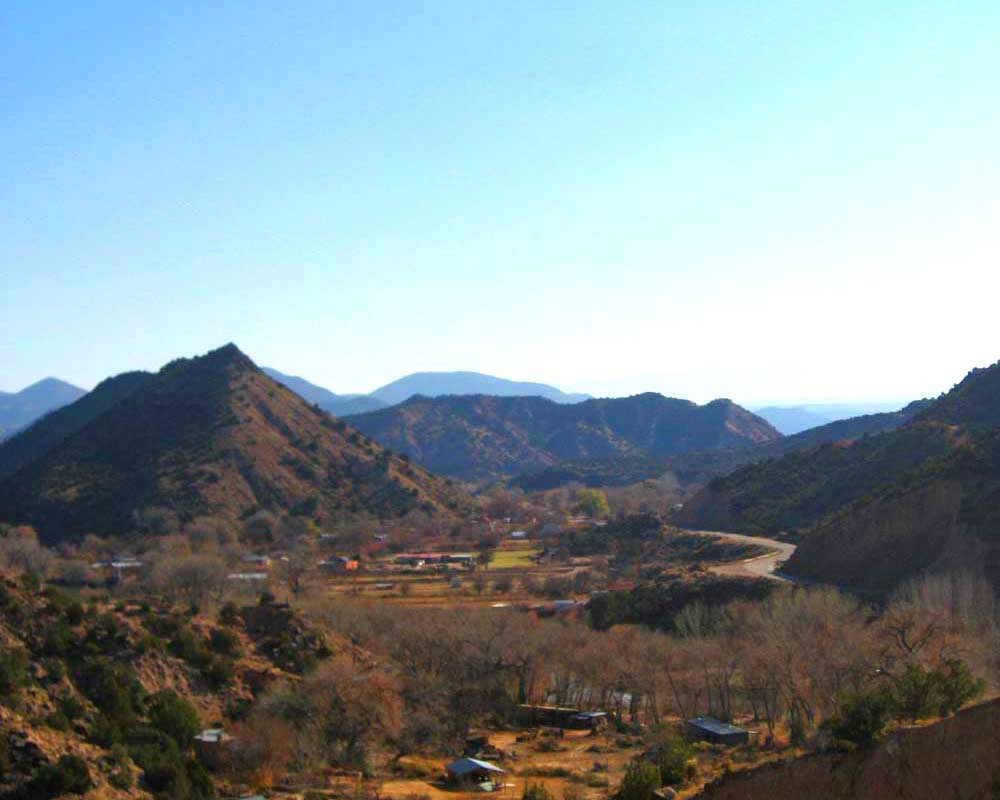
NM Route 68 to Taos at right.

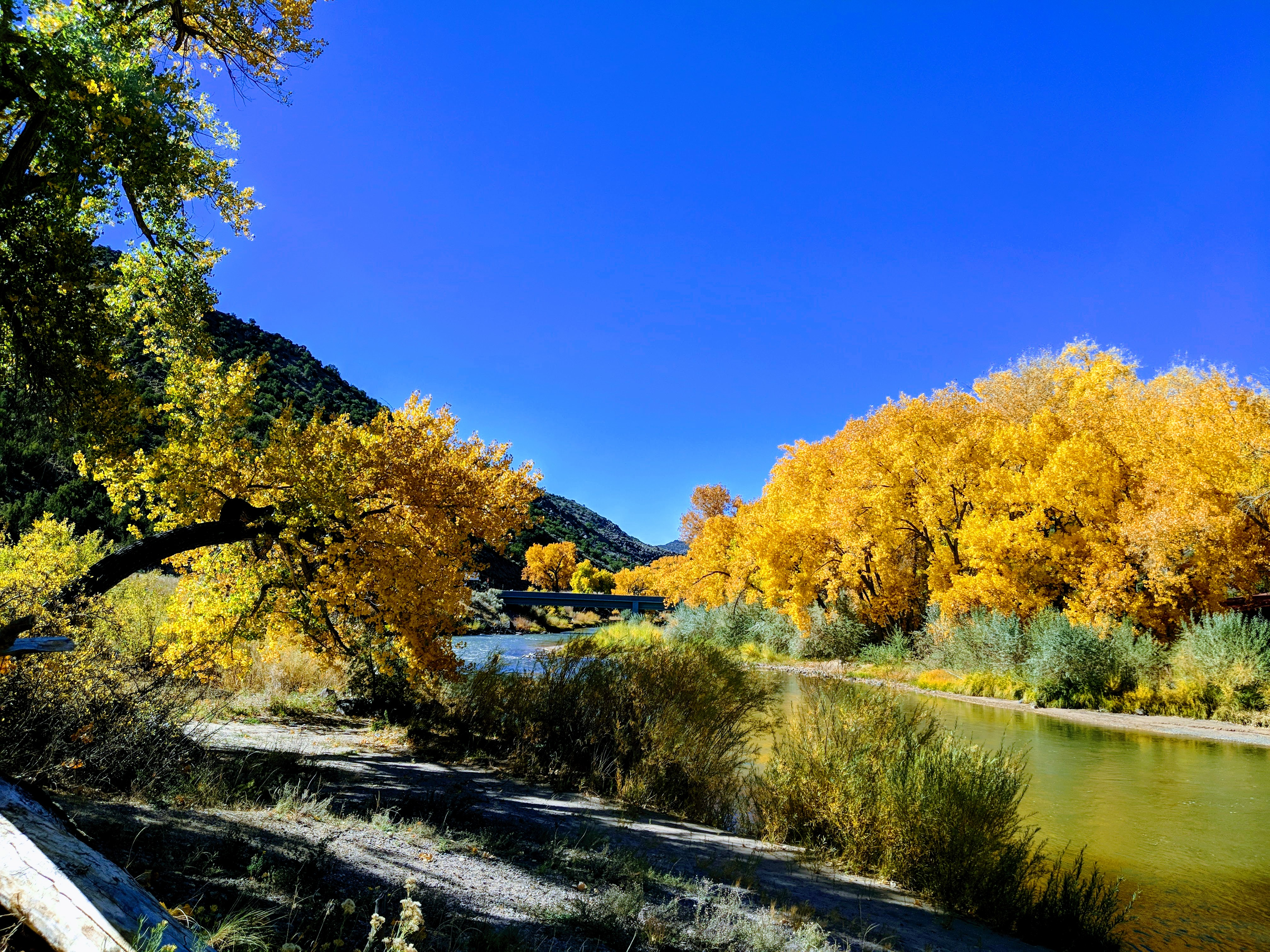
Rio Grande just upstream from the Embudo Bridge

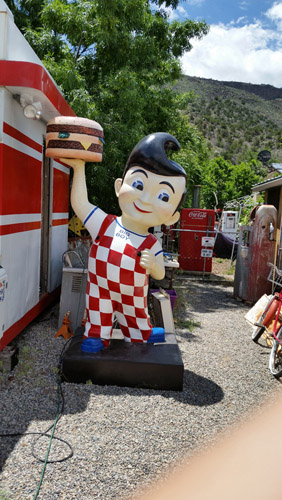
Gas-alley-boy at Johnnie Meier Classical Gas Museum in Embudo.

== See also ==
- National Register of Historic Places listings in Rio Arriba County, New Mexico
