= Llano, New Mexico =

Llano
- Unincorporated community
- Llano de San Juan
- Location within the state of New Mexico Llano (the United States)
- Coordinates: 36°08′24″N 105°40′54″W
- Country: United States
- State: New Mexico
- County: Taos
- Elevation: 8,075 ft (2,461 m)

Population (2025)
  - Total: 251
- Time zone: UTC-7 (Mountain (MST))
  - Summer (DST): UTC-6 (MDT)
- ZIP codes: 87543
- Area code: 575
- GNIS feature ID: 908081

Llano, also known as Llano de San Juan is an unincorporated community located in Taos County, New Mexico, United States. The community is located on New Mexico State Road 73, 2.1 miles (3.4 km) south of Peñasco. Llano is located on the Las Trampas Land Grant which dates back to 1751. It was founded in 1796 after governor Fernando Chacon gave permission for settlement in the valley. A post office was operated from 1898 to 1914, and was then reestablished in 1925.

Llano is located about two miles from the scenic High Road to Taos in the valley of the Rio Santa Barbara on the western side of the Sangre de Cristo mountains.

== Gallery ==
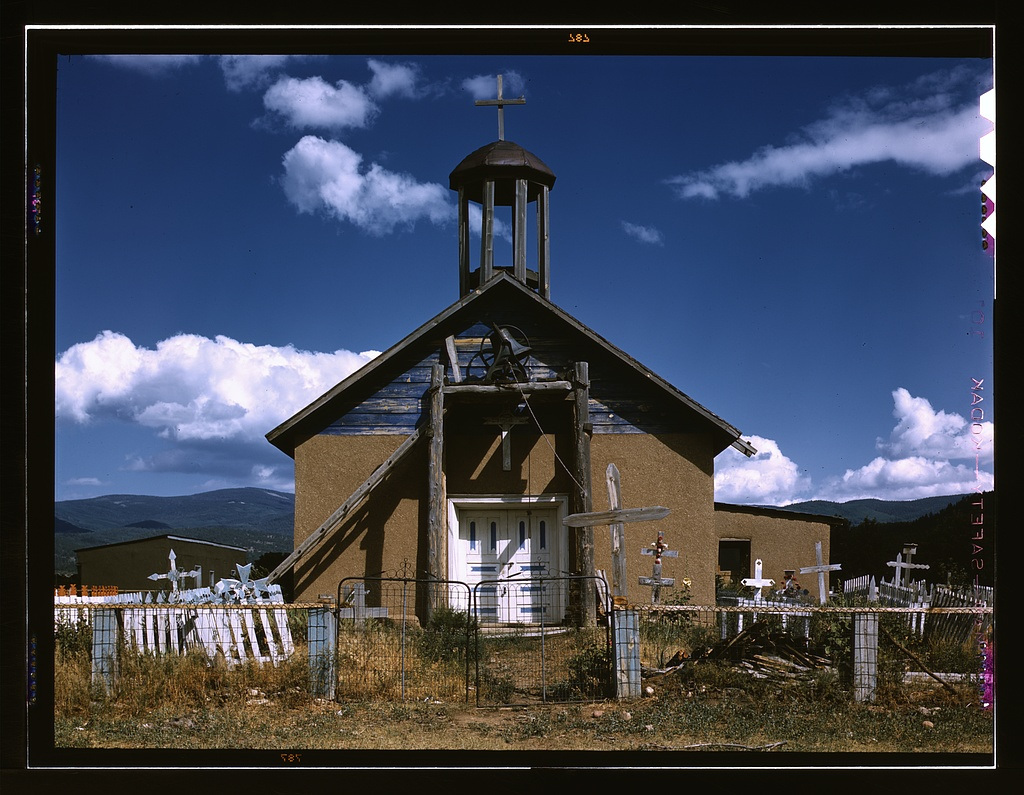
The Catholic Church in Llano.

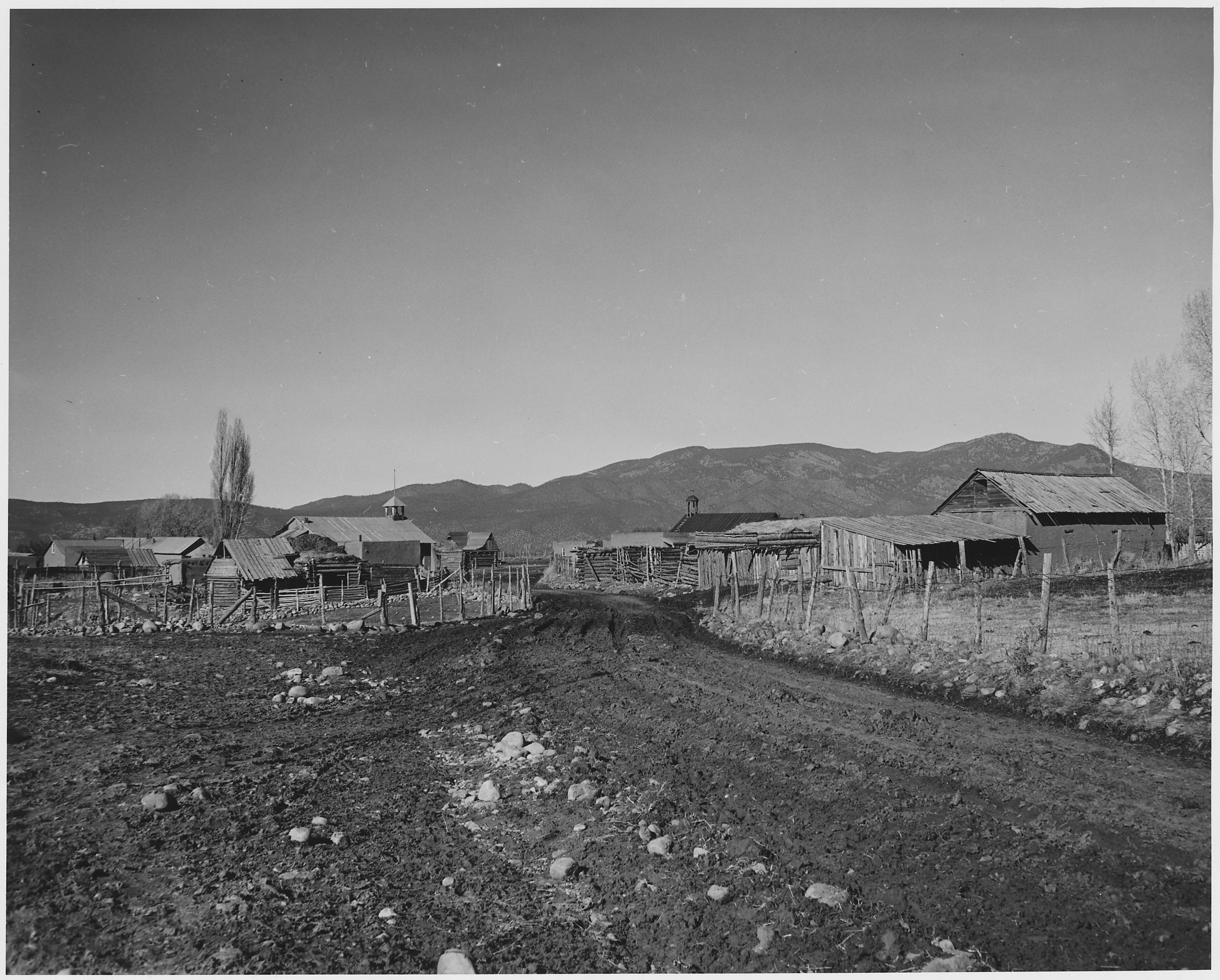
Llano c. 1930s

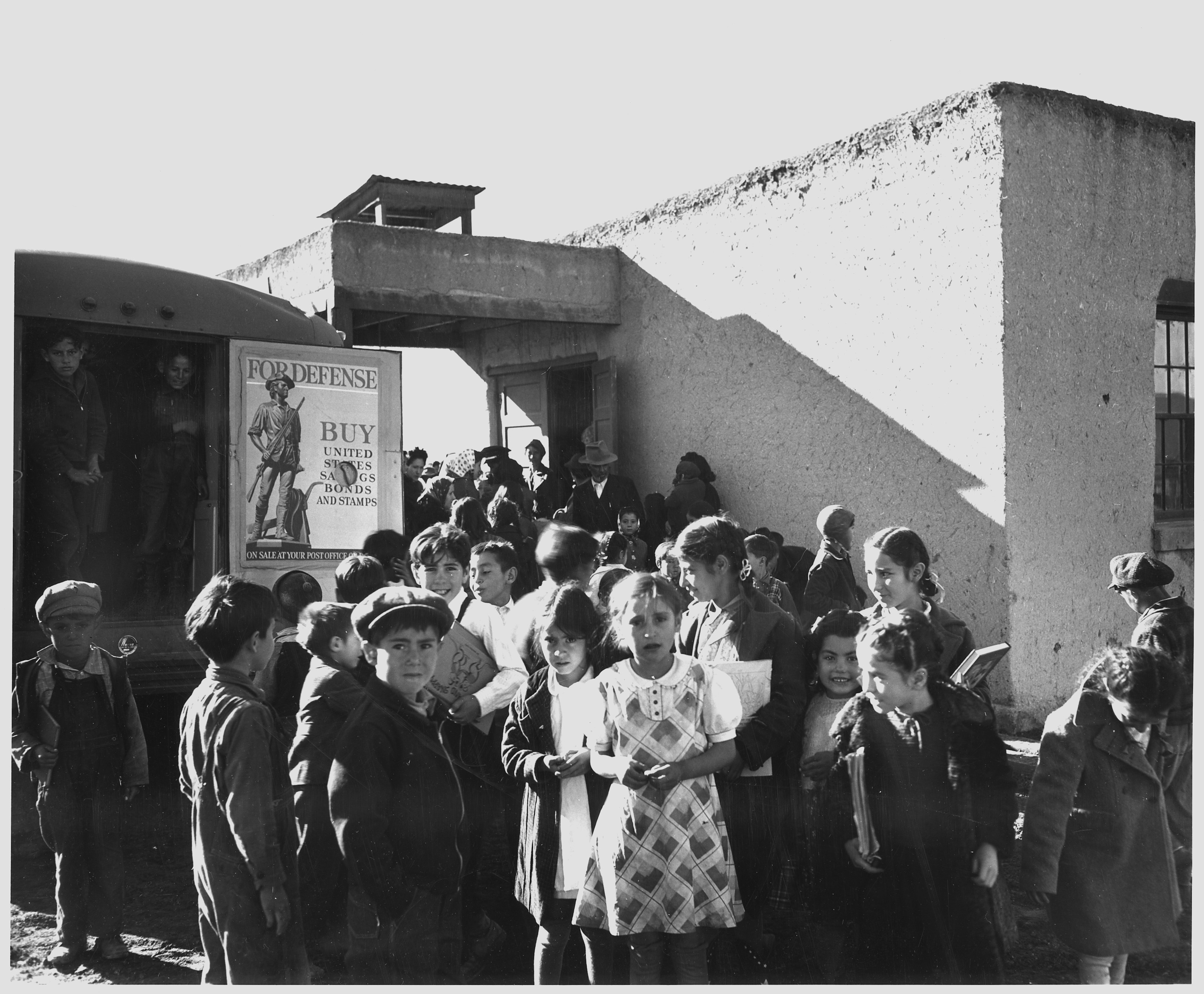
School children in Llano, 1940s

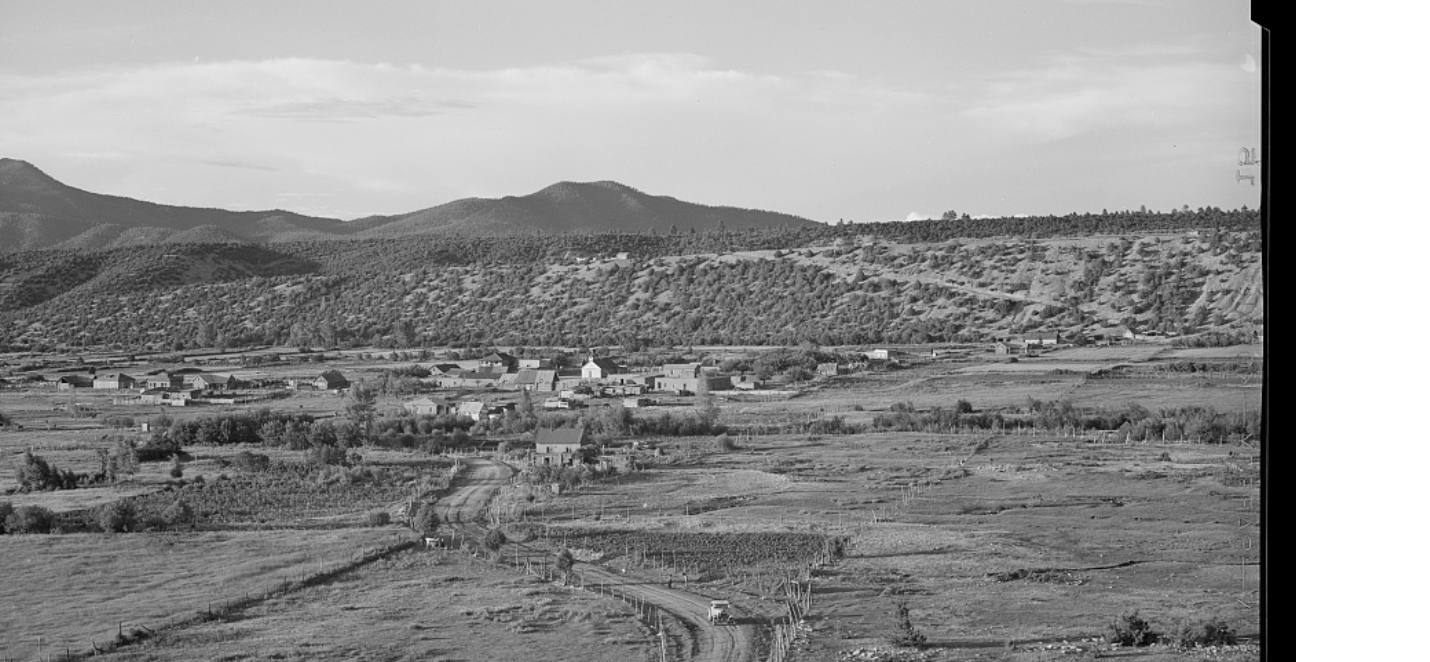
The hamlet of Rodarte, New Mexico, one mile from Llano, August 1940.
