= New Mexico State Road 73 =

State highway in New Mexico, United States

State Road 73

Route information
- Maintained by NMDOT
- Length: 2.688 mi (4.326 km)

Major junctions
- South end: Lower Llano Rd. / Piaza Rd. in Llano
- North end: NM 75 in Peñasco

Location
- Country: United States
- State: New Mexico
- Counties: San Miguel

Highway system
- New Mexico State Highway System; Interstate; US; State; Scenic
← NM 72	→ NM 74

State Road 73 (NM 73) is a state highway in the US state of New Mexico. Its total length is approximately 2.7 miles (4.3 km). NM 73's northern terminus is at NM 75 in Peñasco, and the southern terminus is at an intersection with Lower Llano Rd. / Piaza Rd. in Llano.

== Major intersections ==
The entire route is in Taos County.

Location	mi	km	Destinations	Notes
Peñasco	0.000	0.000	NM 75	Northern terminus
Llano	2.688	4.326	Lower Llano Rd. / Piaza Rd.	Southern terminus
1.000 mi = 1.609 km; 1.000 km = 0.621 mi
