= New Mexico State Road 567 =

State highway in New Mexico, United States

State Road 567
- NM 567 highlighted in red

Route information
- Maintained by NMDOT
- Length: 11.819 mi (19.021 km)

Major junctions
- West end: US 285 near Tres Piedras
- East end: NM 570 near Pilar

Location
- Country: United States
- State: New Mexico
- Counties: Taos

Highway system
- New Mexico State Highway System; Interstate; US; State; Scenic
← NM 566	→ NM 568

State Road 567 (NM 567) is a 11.819-mile-long (19.021 km) state highway in the US state of New Mexico. NM 567's western terminus is at U.S. Route 285 (US 285) south of Tres Piedras, and the eastern terminus is at NM 570 north of Pilar, at the Taos Junction Bridge over the Rio Grande. The junction at US 285 is known as Taos Junction.

== Major intersections ==
The entire route is in Taos County.

Location	mi	km	Destinations	Notes
	0.000	0.000	US 285	Western terminus
	11.819	19.021	NM 570	Eastern terminus
1.000 mi = 1.609 km; 1.000 km = 0.621 mi
