= New Mexico State Road 68 =

State highway in New Mexico, United States

State Road 68
- NM 68 highlighted in red

Route information
- Maintained by NMDOT
- Length: 45.513 mi (73.246 km)

Major junctions
- South end: US 84 / US 285 in Española
- NM 76 in Española; NM 74 in Ohkay Owingeh; NM 75 in La Cienega; NM 518 in Ranchos de Taos
- North end: US 64 in Taos

Location
- Country: United States
- State: New Mexico
- Counties: Rio Arriba, Taos

Highway system
- New Mexico State Highway System; Interstate; US; State; Scenic
← US 66	→ US 70

New Mexico State Road 68 (NM 68) is a 45.513-mile-long (73.246 km) state highway in northern New Mexico, in the Southwestern United States. NM 68 is known as the "River Road to Taos", as its route follows the Rio Grande. A parallel route to the east is NM 76, which is called the "High Road to Taos".

== Route description ==
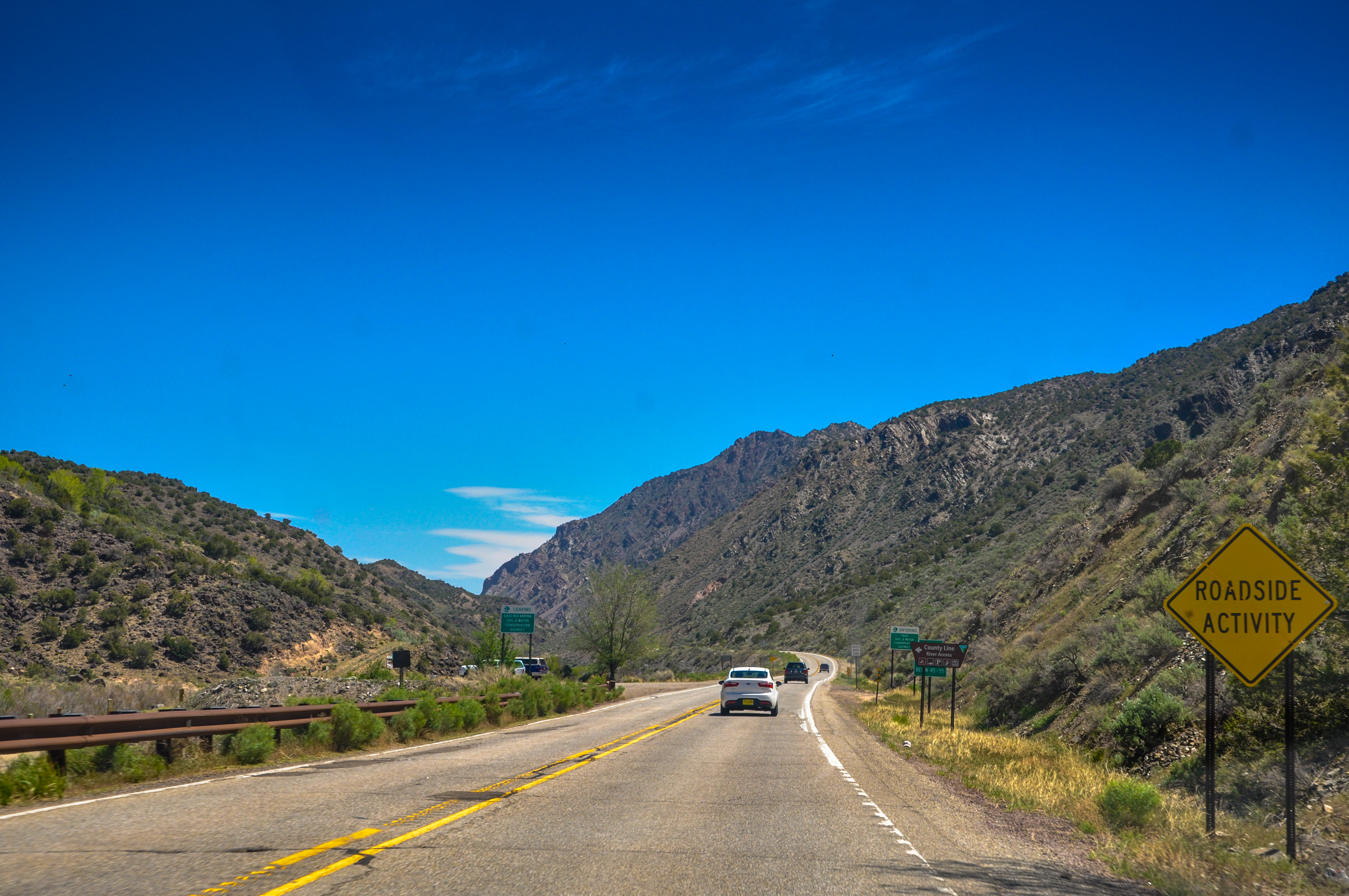
NM 68 entering the Rio Grande Gorge between Taos and Española.

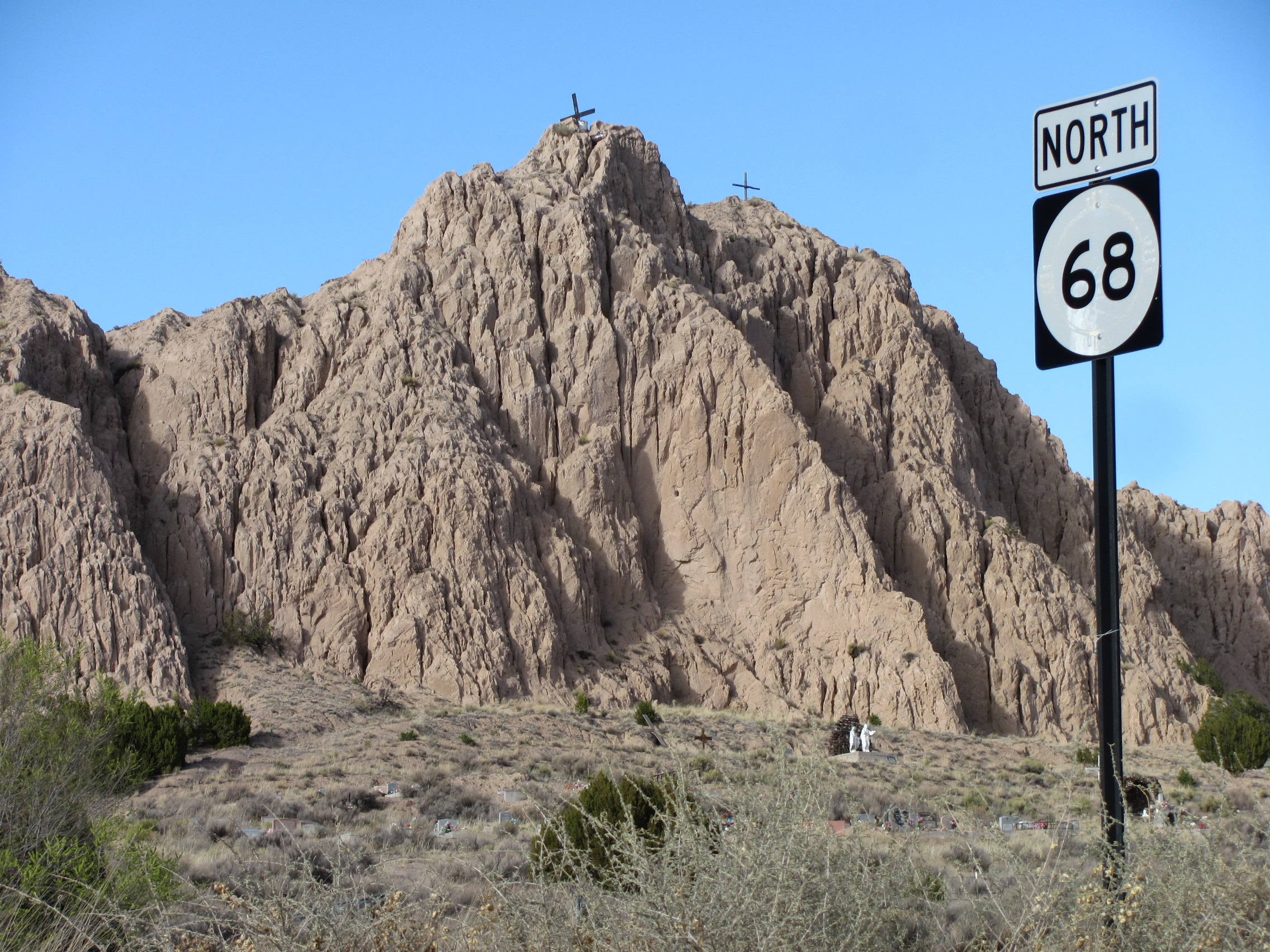
Barrancos Blancos, Embudo, New Mexico

NM 68 begins in the south in Española at the road's junction with U.S. Route 285 and U.S. Route 84 which run concurrently at that point. The road then runs northeast through Alcalde, Velarde, Embudo, and Ranchos de Taos, where it meets the north end of New Mexico State Road 518, before reaching its northern terminus at U.S. Route 64 in Taos.

Between Española and Velarde, State Road 68 is a four-lane divided highway with a 60-mile-per-hour (95 km/h) speed limit (with a 55 mph [90 km/h] limit as it nears Velarde and 45 mph [70 km/h] limit through Velarde); between Velarde and Taos, Highway 68 is a two-lane highway with very few passing lanes.

== Future ==
Several plans involve safety improvements on NM 68 at its intersection with US 64.

== Major intersections ==
County	Location	mi	km	Destinations	Notes
Rio Arriba	Española	0.000	0.000	US 84 / US 285 (Santa Clara Bridge Road / Riverside Drive) – Tierra Amarilla, Santa Fe, Antonito, CO	Southern terminus
Rio Arriba	Española	0.741	1.193	NM 76 east (Santa Cruz Road) – Chimayo	Western terminus of NM 76
Rio Arriba	Española	1.491	2.400	NM 583 east / NM 584 west (Fairview Lane)	Western terminus of NM 583, eastern terminus of NM 584
Rio Arriba	Española	2.756	4.435	NM 291 south (El Llano Road)	Northern terminus of NM 291
Rio Arriba	Ohkay Owingeh	4.088	6.579	NM 74 west – Hernandez	Eastern terminus of NM 74
Rio Arriba	Embudo	20.818	33.503	NM 75 east – Dixon	Western terminus of NM 75
Taos	Pilar	29.028	46.716	NM 570 north	Southern terminus of NM 570
Taos	El Llano	39.450	63.489	NM 570 south	Northern terminus of NM 570
Taos	Ranchos de Taos	41.676	67.071	NM 240 north	Southern terminus of NM 240
Taos	Ranchos de Taos	41.982	67.563	NM 518 south – Tres Ritos	Northern terminus of NM 518
Taos	Taos	43.385	69.821	NM 585 west (Paseo del Canon)	Eastern terminus of NM 585
Taos	Taos	45.383	73.037	NM 240 south (Ranchitos Road)	Northern terminus of NM 240
Taos	Taos	45.513	73.246	US 64 – Tierra Amarilla, Raton	Northern terminus
1.000 mi = 1.609 km; 1.000 km = 0.621 mi

== See also ==
- List of state roads in New Mexico
