= New Mexico State Road 570 =

State highway in New Mexico, United States

State Road 570
- NM 570 highlighted in red

Route information
- Maintained by NMDOT
- Length: 6.118 mi (9.846 km)

Major junctions
- South end: NM 68 in Pilar
- North end: NM 68 in Taos

Location
- Country: United States
- State: New Mexico
- Counties: Taos

Highway system
- New Mexico State Highway System; Interstate; US; State; Scenic
← NM 569	→ NM 571

State Road 570 (NM 570) is a 12.5-mile-long (20.1 km) state highway in the US state of New Mexico. NM 570's southern terminus is at NM 68 in Pilar, and the northern terminus is at NM 68 in El Llano.

== Major intersections ==
The entire route is in Taos County.

Location	mi	km	Destinations	Notes
Pilar	0.000	0.000	NM 68	Southern terminus
	6.118	9.846	NM 567 west	Northern terminus. Eastern terminus of NM 567
1.000 mi = 1.609 km; 1.000 km = 0.621 mi
