= New Mexico State Road 580 =

State highway in New Mexico, United States

State Road 580
- NM 580 highlighted in red

Route information
- Maintained by NMDOT
- Length: 2.200 mi (3.541 km)

Major junctions
- West end: NM 75 near Dixon
- East end: CR 69 / CR 70

Location
- Country: United States
- State: New Mexico
- Counties: Rio Arriba

Highway system
- New Mexico State Highway System; Interstate; US; State; Scenic
← NM 578	→ NM 581

State Road 580 (NM 580) is a 2.2-mile-long (3.5 km) state highway in the US state of New Mexico. NM 580's western terminus is at NM 75 east-southeast of Dixon, and the eastern terminus is at County Route 69 (CR 69) at the intersection of CR 70.

== Major intersections ==
The entire route is in Rio Arriba County.

Location	mi	km	Destinations	Notes
	0.000	0.000	NM 75	Western terminus
	2.200	3.541	CR 69 / CR 70	Eastern terminus, continues east as CR 69 at CR 70
1.000 mi = 1.609 km; 1.000 km = 0.621 mi
