= New Mexico State Road 503 =

State highway in Rio Arriba and Santa Fe counties in New Mexico, United States

State Road 503
- NM 503 highlighted in red

Route information
- Maintained by NMDOT
- Length: 14.570 mi (23.448 km)

Major junctions
- South end: US 84 in Pojoaque
- North end: NM 76 in Rio Chiquito

Location
- Country: United States
- State: New Mexico
- Counties: Rio Arriba, Santa Fe

Highway system
- New Mexico State Highway System; Interstate; US; State; Scenic
← NM 502	→ NM 505

State Road 503 (NM 503) is a 14.57-mile-long (23.45 km) state highway in the US state of New Mexico. NM 503's southern terminus is at U.S. Route 84 (US 84) in Pojoaque, and the northern terminus is at NM 76 east of Espanola in Rio Chiquito.

== Major intersections ==
County	Location	mi	km	Destinations	Notes
Santa Fe	Pojoaque	0.000	0.000	US 84	Southern terminus
Santa Fe		7.570	12.183	CR 98 north (Juan Medina Road)	Southern terminus of former NM 520, southern terminus of CR 98
Rio Arriba	Rio Chiquito	14.570	23.448	NM 76	Northern terminus
1.000 mi = 1.609 km; 1.000 km = 0.621 mi

== See also ==
- List of state roads in New Mexico
