= Cañoncito, Taos County, New Mexico =

Cañoncito, New Mexico
- Unincorporated community
- Location within New Mexico
- Coordinates: 36°32′40″N 105°38′02″W
- Country: United States
- State: New Mexico
- County: Taos
- Elevation: 7,254 ft (2,211 m)
- Time zone: UTC-7 (Mountain (MST))
  - Summer (DST): UTC-6 (MDT)
- Area code: 575
- GNIS feature ID: 924830

Cañoncito is an unincorporated community in Taos County, New Mexico, United States. Cañoncito is 10 miles (16 km) north-northwest of Taos.
