= El Rito, Taos County, New Mexico =

Unincorporated community in Taos County, New Mexico, US

El Rito in an unincorporated community in Taos County, New Mexico, United States.

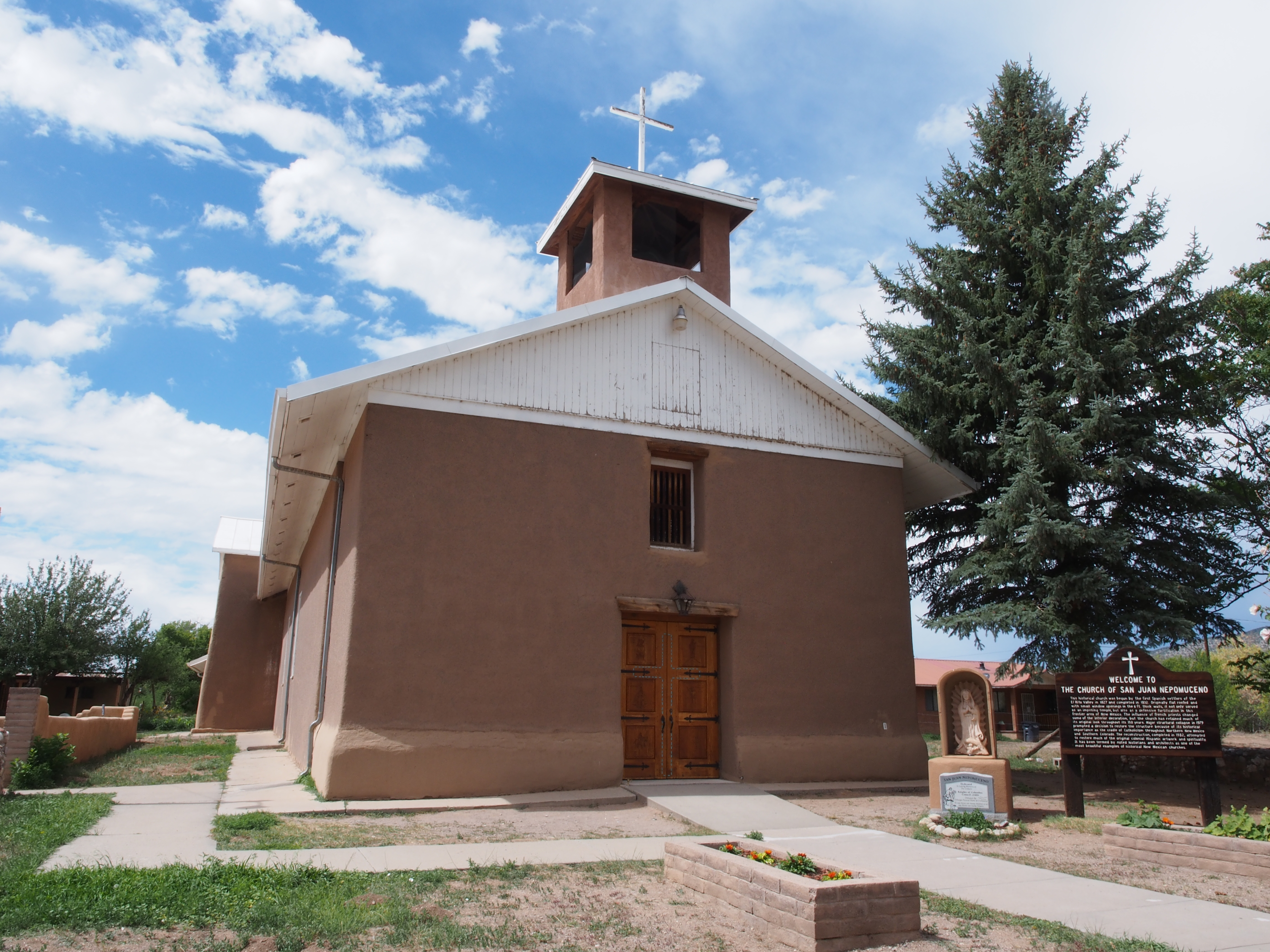
San Juan Nepomuceno Catholic Church, El Rito

El Rito is located at 36°48′00″N 105°34′04″W, 8,032 feet (2,448 m) above sea level.
