= New Mexico State Road 74 =

State highway in New Mexico, United States

State Road 74

Route information
- Maintained by NMDOT
- Length: 4.755 mi (7.652 km)

Major junctions
- South end: NM 68 in Ohkay Owingeh
- North end: US 84 / US 285 in El Duende

Location
- Country: United States
- State: New Mexico
- Counties: Rio Arriba

Highway system
- New Mexico State Highway System; Interstate; US; State; Scenic
← NM 73	→ NM 75

State Road 74 (NM 74) is a state highway in the US state of New Mexico. Its total length is approximately 4.8 miles (7.7 km). NM 74's southern terminus is at NM 68 in Ohkay Owingeh, and the northern terminus is at U.S. Route 84/U.S. Route 285 (US 84/US 285) in El Duende.

== Major intersections ==
The entire route is in Rio Arriba County.

Location	mi	km	Destinations	Notes
Ohkay Owingeh	0.000	0.000	NM 68	Southern terminus
	1.920	3.090	CR 57 north	Southern terminus of former NM 582
El Duende	4.755	7.652	US 84 / US 285	Northern terminus
1.000 mi = 1.609 km; 1.000 km = 0.621 mi
