= No Agua, New Mexico =

- Unincorporated community
- Nickname: Chile Line
- Location of No Agua, New Mexico
- Coordinates: 36°43′14″N 105°58′9″W
- Country: United States
- State: New Mexico
- County: Taos
- Elevation: 8,179 ft (2,493 m)
- Time zone: UTC-7 (Mountain (MST))
  - Summer (DST): UTC-6 (MDT)
- GNIS feature ID: 772623

No Agua is an unincorporated community in Taos County, New Mexico, United States. It was also known as La Grande.

"No Agua" translates to "No water" in Spanish, referencing the lack of surface water or precipitation in the community.
