= New Mexico State Road 76 =

State highway in New Mexico, United States

State Road 76
- NM 76 highlighted in red

Route information
- Maintained by NMDOT
- Length: 29.805 mi (47.966 km)

Major junctions
- West end: NM 68 in Santa Cruz
- East end: NM 75 in Picuris Pueblo

Location
- Country: United States
- State: New Mexico
- Counties: Rio Arriba, Santa Fe, Taos

Highway system
- New Mexico State Highway System; Interstate; US; State; Scenic
← NM 75	→ NM 77

State Road 76 (NM 76) is a state highway in the US state of New Mexico. Its total length is approximately 29.8 miles (48.0 km). NM 76's western terminus is at NM 68 in Santa Cruz and the eastern terminus is in Picuris Pueblo at NM 75.

== History ==
At the January 17, 2018 Transportation Commission meeting a 9.879 miles (15.899 km) was dedicated as "Casimiro Roca Memorial Highway" to honor Father Casimiro Roca. Father Casimiro Roca served the community of Chimayó, and had a large part in caring for and helping restore the Santuario de Chimayó.

== Major intersections ==
County	Location	mi	km	Destinations	Notes
Santa Fe	Santa Cruz	0.000	0.000	NM 68	Western terminus
Santa Fe	Santa Cruz	1.190	1.915	NM 583 north	Southern terminus of NM 583
Santa Fe	Santa Cruz	1.819	2.927	NM 106 south	Northern terminus of NM 106
Rio Arriba	Chimayo	11.409	18.361	NM 503 south – Rio Chiquito, Santa Cruz Lake	Northern terminus of NM 503
Taos	Picuris Pueblo	29.805	47.966	NM 75 – Picuris Pueblo, Espanola, Taos, Sipapu Ski Area	Eastern terminus
1.000 mi = 1.609 km; 1.000 km = 0.621 mi

== See also ==
- List of state roads in New Mexico
