= Peñasco Independent School District =

School district in New Mexico, United States

Peñasco Independent School District is a school district headquartered in Peñasco, New Mexico. It has two schools: an elementary school and a secondary (middle and high) school. The elementary school is located just off Federal Highway 82, in the mountains about 25 miles southeast of Taos, New Mexico.

Geoffrey Plant of Taos News described the school district as "rural".

In Taos County the district includes: Peñasco, Chamisal, Picuris Pueblo, Rio Lucio, and Vadito. In Rio Arriba County the district includes a portion of Ojo Sarco.

== History ==
Lisa Hamilton served as the superintendent in July 2020, when she removed the secondary school principal and gave the principal a different job. In December 2020 school board voted 3 to 2 to remove Hamilton as the superintendent.

In 2022 the district banned tobacco completely from all facilities.

== Campuses ==
The elementary school is, from spring 2023, to receive heating services.
