= Taos County, New Mexico =

County in New Mexico, United States

- County
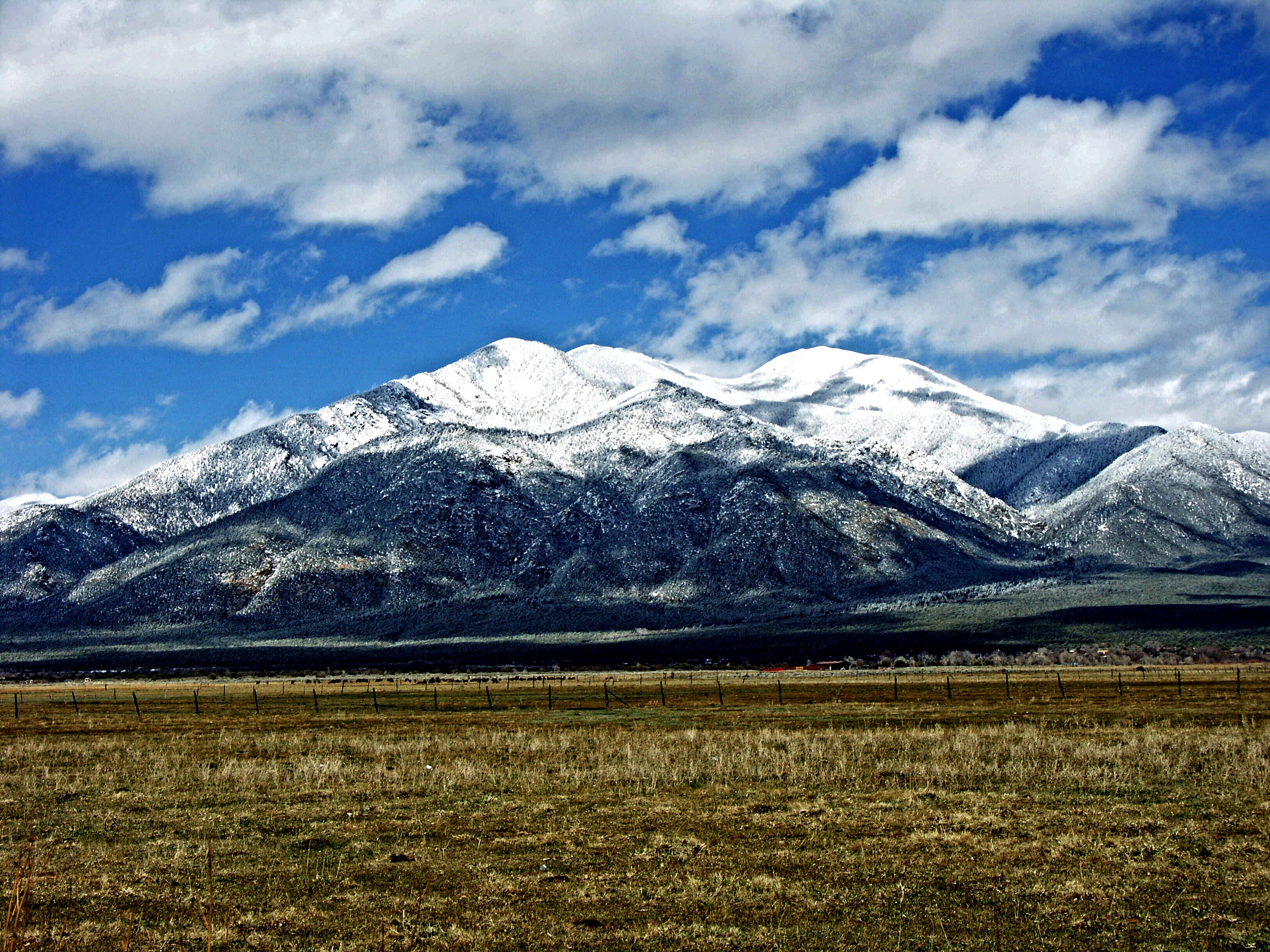
- Taos Mountain from El Prado

- Seal

- Location within the U.S. state of New Mexico
- Coordinates: 36°34′N 105°38′W
- Country: United States
- State: New Mexico
- Founded: January 9, 1852
- Seat: Taos
- Largest town: Taos

Area
  - Total: 2,204 sq mi (5,710 km^{2})
  - Land: 2,203 sq mi (5,710 km^{2})
  - Water: 1.3 sq mi (3.4 km^{2}) 0.06%

Population (2020)
  - Total: 34,489
  - Estimate (2025): 34,564 ▲
  - Density: 15.66/sq mi (6.045/km^{2})
- Time zone: UTC−7 (Mountain)
  - Summer (DST): UTC−6 (MDT)
- Congressional district: 3rd
- Website: www.taoscounty.org

Taos County is a county in the U.S. state of New Mexico. As of the 2020 census, the population was 34,489. Its county seat is Taos. The county was formed in 1852 as one of the original nine counties in New Mexico Territory.

Taos County comprises the Taos, New Mexico Micropolitan Statistical Area.

== Geography ==
According to the U.S. Census Bureau, the county has a total area of 2,204 square miles (5,710 km^{2}), of which 2,203 square miles (5,710 km^{2}) is land and 1.3 square miles (3.4 km^{2}) (0.06%) is water.

The county's highest point is the summit of Wheeler Peak at 13,161 feet (4,011 m). This summit is also the highest natural point in New Mexico. The county has the highest mean elevation of any U.S. county outside of Colorado at 8,510 feet (2,590 m), even though it ranks only 22nd overall. Taos County contains 17 of New Mexico's 25 highest peaks.

=== Adjacent counties ===
- Rio Arriba County - west
- Mora County - southeast
- Colfax County - east
- Costilla County, Colorado - north
- Conejos County, Colorado - northwest

=== National protected area ===
- Carson National Forest (part)
- Rio Grande del Norte National Monument

== Demographics ==
Historical population
Census	Pop.	Note	%±
1850	9,507		—
1860	14,103		48.3%
1870	12,079		−14.4%
1880	11,029		−8.7%
1890	9,868		−10.5%
1900	10,889		10.3%
1910	12,008		10.3%
1920	12,773		6.4%
1930	14,394		12.7%
1940	18,528		28.7%
1950	17,146		−7.5%
1960	15,934		−7.1%
1970	17,516		9.9%
1980	19,456		11.1%
1990	23,118		18.8%
2000	29,979		29.7%
2010	32,937		9.9%
2020	34,489		4.7%
2025 (est.)	34,564	▲	0.2%
U.S. Decennial Census; 1790-1960 1900-1990; 1990-2000 2010-2020

=== 2020 census ===
As of the 2020 census, the county had a population of 34,489. The median age was 50.0 years. 17.5% of residents were under the age of 18 and 27.4% of residents were 65 years of age or older. For every 100 females there were 95.2 males, and for every 100 females age 18 and over there were 94.0 males age 18 and over.

Taos County, New Mexico – Racial and ethnic composition Note: the US Census treats Hispanic/Latino as an ethnic category. This table excludes Latinos from the racial categories and assigns them to a separate category. Hispanics/Latinos may be of any race.
Race / Ethnicity (NH = Non-Hispanic)	Pop 2000	Pop 2010	Pop 2020	% 2000	% 2010	% 2020
White alone (NH)	10,122	11,958	13,706	33.76%	36.31%	39.74%
Black or African American alone (NH)	81	104	130	0.27%	0.32%	0.38%
Native American or Alaska Native alone (NH)	1,768	1,747	1,830	5.90%	5.30%	5.31%
Asian alone (NH)	98	201	196	0.33%	0.61%	0.57%
Pacific Islander alone (NH)	10	5	4	0.03%	0.02%	0.01%
Other race alone (NH)	104	85	274	0.35%	0.26%	0.79%
Mixed race or Multiracial (NH)	426	456	919	1.42%	1.38%	2.66%
Hispanic or Latino (any race)	17,370	18,381	17,430	57.94%	55.81%	50.54%
Total	29,979	32,937	34,489	100.00%	100.00%	100.00%

The racial makeup of the county was 55.3% White, 0.5% Black or African American, 6.6% American Indian and Alaska Native, 0.6% Asian, 0.0% Native Hawaiian and Pacific Islander, 14.9% from some other race, and 22.0% from two or more races. Hispanic or Latino residents of any race comprised 50.5% of the population.

45.4% of residents lived in urban areas, while 54.6% lived in rural areas.

There were 15,747 households in the county, of which 22.3% had children under the age of 18 living with them and 31.6% had a female householder with no spouse or partner present. About 36.4% of all households were made up of individuals and 17.8% had someone living alone who was 65 years of age or older.

There were 20,904 housing units, of which 24.7% were vacant. Among occupied housing units, 71.5% were owner-occupied and 28.5% were renter-occupied. The homeowner vacancy rate was 1.8% and the rental vacancy rate was 9.0%.

=== 2010 census ===
As of the 2010 census, there were 32,937 people, 14,806 households, and 8,437 families living in the county. The population density was 15.0 inhabitants per square mile (5.8/km^{2}). There were 20,265 housing units at an average density of 9.2 per square mile (3.6/km^{2}). The racial makeup of the county was 68.7% white, 6.2% American Indian, 0.7% Asian, 0.4% black or African American, 19.1% from other races, and 4.9% from two or more races. Those of Hispanic or Latino origin made up 55.8% of the population. In terms of ancestry, 10.8% were English, 10.3% were German, 9.0% were Irish, and 1.2% were American.

Of the 14,806 households, 26.2% had children under the age of 18 living with them, 38.3% were married couples living together, 12.6% had a female householder with no husband present, 43.0% were non-families, and 36.0% of all households were made up of individuals. The average household size was 2.19 and the average family size was 2.85. The median age was 45.2 years.

The median income for a household in the county was $35,441 and the median income for a family was $43,236. Males had a median income of $34,245 versus $28,325 for females. The per capita income for the county was $22,145. About 14.5% of families and 17.0% of the population were below the poverty line, including 28.3% of those under age 18 and 11.9% of those age 65 or over.

=== 2000 census ===
As of the 2000 census, there were 29,979 people, 12,675 households, and 7,757 families living in the county. The population density was 14 people per square mile (5.4 people/km^{2}). There were 17,404 housing units at an average density of 8 per square mile (3.1/km^{2}). The racial makeup of the county was 63.77% White, 0.35% Black or African American, 6.59% Native American, 0.38% Asian, 0.12% Pacific Islander, 24.84% from other races, and 3.95% from two or more races. Hispanic or Latino of any race were 57.94% of the population.

There were 12,675 households, out of which 29.90% had children under the age of 18 living with them, 42.70% were married couples living together, 12.70% had a female householder with no husband present, and 38.80% were non-families. 32.10% of all households were made up of individuals, and 8.90% had someone living alone who was 65 years of age or older. The average household size was 2.34 and the average family size was 2.98.

In the county, the population was spread out, with 24.50% under the age of 18, 6.90% from 18 to 24, 27.40% from 25 to 44, 28.80% from 45 to 64, and 12.30% who were 65 years of age or older. The median age was 40 years. For every 100 females there were 96.20 males. For every 100 females age 18 and over, there were 93.70 males.

The median income for a household in the county was $26,762, and the median income for a family was $33,995. Males had a median income of $27,310 versus $21,121 for females. The per capita income for the county was $16,103. About 16.10% of families and 20.90% of the population were below the poverty line, including 24.60% of those under age 18 and 20.80% of those age 65 or over.

== Communities ==
=== Towns ===
- Red River
- Taos (county seat)

=== Villages ===
- Questa
- Taos Ski Valley

=== Census-designated places ===
- Arroyo Hondo
- Arroyo Seco
- Chamisal
- Costilla
- Ojo Caliente
- Peñasco
- Picuris Pueblo
- Ranchos de Taos
- Rio Lucio
- San Cristobal
- Talpa
- Taos Pueblo
- Vadito

=== Other communities ===
- Amalia
- Cañoncito
- Carson
- Cerro
- El Prado
- El Rito
- Las Trampas
- Llano
- Llano Quemado
- No Agua
- Pilar
- Tres Piedras
- Valdez

== Politics ==
Taos County is heavily Democratic; the last Republican candidate to win the county was Richard Nixon in 1972 by just over 2%. Taos County often rivals Santa Fe County as the most Democratic county in New Mexico. Taos itself, Ranchos de Taos, Taos Pueblo, Taos Ski Valley, Picuris Pueblo, the Arroyo Seco and Arroyo Hondo areas, and the rural southern and western parts of the county all vote strongly Democratic, while the Red River area votes strongly Republican. Questa and El Prado are also Democratic-leaning, though they saw heavy Republican trends in 2024.

United States presidential election results for Taos County, New Mexico
Year	Republican		Democratic		Third party(ies)	
Year	No.	%	No.	%	No.	%
1912	855	44.58%	765	39.89%	298	15.54%
1916	1,320	57.95%	910	39.95%	48	2.11%
1920	2,519	64.86%	1,359	34.99%	6	0.15%
1924	2,470	58.68%	1,655	39.32%	84	2.00%
1928	2,441	56.98%	1,842	43.00%	1	0.02%
1932	2,416	42.22%	3,277	57.26%	30	0.52%
1936	2,918	48.80%	3,051	51.03%	10	0.17%
1940	3,342	49.07%	3,463	50.85%	5	0.07%
1944	2,557	50.30%	2,525	49.67%	2	0.04%
1948	2,852	48.59%	2,977	50.72%	41	0.70%
1952	2,763	48.94%	2,877	50.96%	6	0.11%
1956	3,100	53.02%	2,743	46.91%	4	0.07%
1960	2,620	41.87%	3,631	58.03%	6	0.10%
1964	2,006	32.16%	4,204	67.39%	28	0.45%
1968	3,119	49.89%	2,993	47.87%	140	2.24%
1972	3,617	50.49%	3,472	48.46%	75	1.05%
1976	3,012	40.07%	4,414	58.72%	91	1.21%
1980	3,584	41.67%	4,346	50.53%	671	7.80%
1984	4,154	44.04%	5,144	54.54%	134	1.42%
1988	2,897	31.29%	6,271	67.73%	91	0.98%
1992	2,260	21.16%	7,051	66.01%	1,370	12.83%
1996	2,126	21.15%	6,635	66.00%	1,292	12.85%
2000	2,744	25.19%	7,039	64.61%	1,112	10.21%
2004	3,666	24.71%	10,987	74.06%	182	1.23%
2008	2,866	16.97%	13,816	81.82%	204	1.21%
2012	2,730	17.80%	11,978	78.09%	631	4.11%
2016	2,727	17.87%	10,668	69.91%	1,865	12.22%
2020	3,715	21.62%	13,121	76.37%	345	2.01%
2024	4,139	24.88%	12,038	72.36%	459	2.76%

== Education ==
School districts for the county include:

- Mesa Vista Consolidated Schools
- Peñasco Independent Schools
- Questa Independent Schools
- Taos Municipal Schools

== In popular culture ==
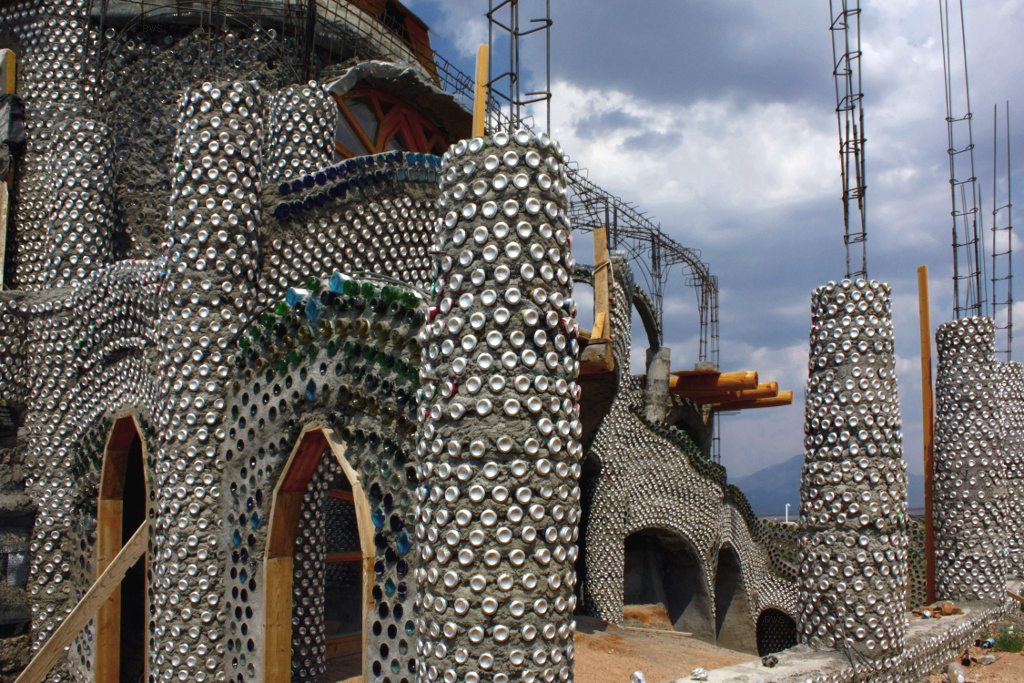
Earthship home under construction, 2011

The Rio Grande Gorge Bridge is featured in the 1994 crime-drama film Natural Born Killers, in the 2007 comedy Wild Hogs, and in the 2009 film Terminator: Salvation.

The 2007 film Garbage Warrior documents architect Mike Reynolds who builds Earthships in and around Taos County.

== Transportation ==
=== Major highways ===
- US 64
- US 285
- NM 38
- NM 68
- NM 73
- NM 75
- NM 76
- NM 111
- NM 150
- NM 196
- NM 230
- NM 240
- NM 382
- NM 414
- NM 515
- NM 518
- NM 522
- NM 567
- NM 570
- NM 578
- NM 585

== See also ==
- National Register of Historic Places listings in Taos County, New Mexico
