= Llano Quemado, New Mexico =

- unincorporated community
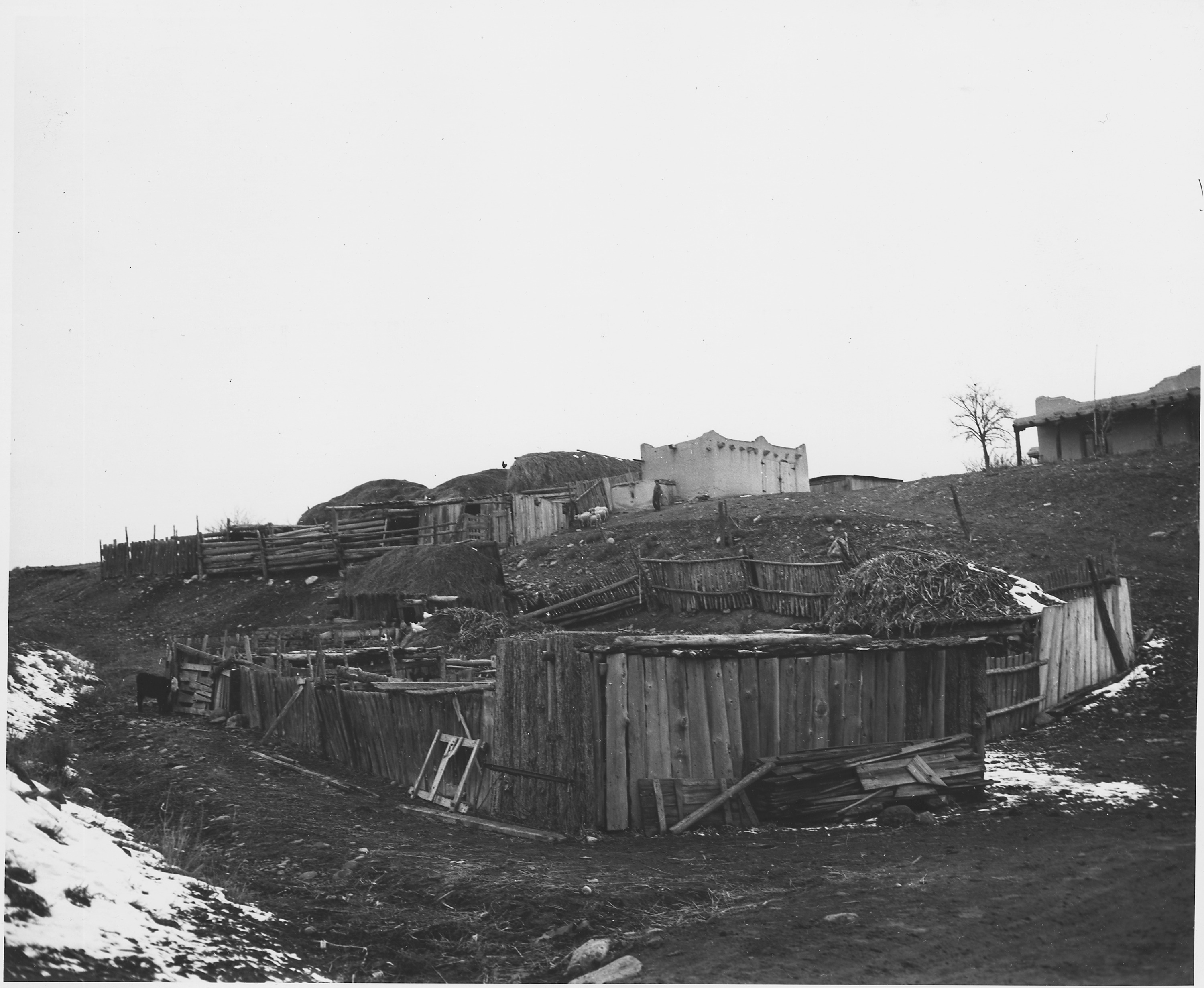
- Llano Quemado, December 1941
- Interactive map of Llano Quemado, New Mexico
- Coordinates: 36°20′28″N 105°36′51″W
- Country: United States
- State: New Mexico
- County: Taos
- Elevation: 8,179 ft (2,493 m)
- Time zone: UTC-7 (Mountain (MST))
  - Summer (DST): UTC-6 (MDT)
- ZIP codes: 87557
- GNIS feature ID: 2629117

Llano Quemado is an unincorporated community and former census-designated place in Taos County, New Mexico, United States, situated immediately southwest of Ranchos De Taos.
