= Rio Lucio, New Mexico =

- CDP
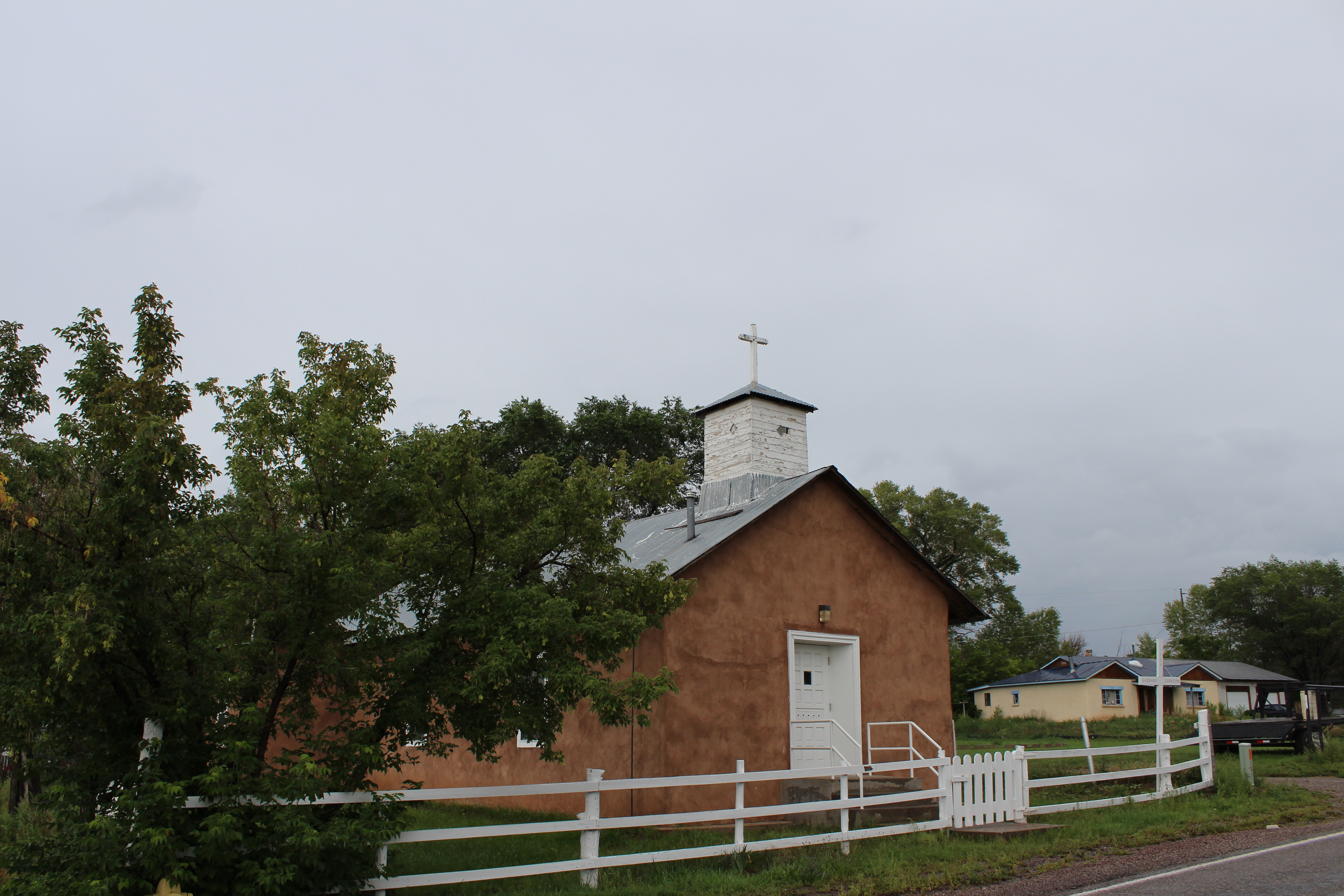
- Chapel of Sagrado Corazón de Jesús in Rio Lucio

- Location of Rio Lucio, New Mexico

- Location in the United States
- Coordinates: 36°11′32″N 105°43′12″W
- Country: United States
- State: New Mexico
- County: Taos

Area
  - Total: 1.05 sq mi (2.72 km^{2})
  - Land: 1.05 sq mi (2.72 km^{2})
  - Water: 0 sq mi (0.00 km^{2})
- Elevation: 7,307 ft (2,227 m)

Population (2020)
  - Total: 303
  - Density: 288.1/sq mi (111.25/km^{2})
- Time zone: UTC-7 (Mountain (MST))
  - Summer (DST): UTC-6 (MDT)
- ZIP code: 87553
- Area code: 505
- FIPS code: 35-63250
- GNIS feature ID: 2409176

Rio Lucio is a census-designated place (CDP) in Taos County, New Mexico, United States. As of the 2020 census, Rio Lucio had a population of 303.

== Geography ==
According to the United States Census Bureau, the CDP has a total area of 1.1 square miles (2.8 km^{2}), all land.

== Demographics ==
Historical population
| Census | Pop. | Note | %± |
|---|---|---|---|
| 2020 | 303 | | — |
U.S. Decennial Census

As of the census of 2000, there were 379 people, 146 households, and 115 families residing in the CDP. The population density was 354.8 inhabitants per square mile (137.0/km^{2}). There were 187 housing units at an average density of 175.1 per square mile (67.6/km^{2}). The racial makeup of the CDP was 35.36% White, 3.43% Native American, 55.94% from other races, and 5.28% from two or more races. Hispanic or Latino of any race were 93.40% of the population.

There were 146 households, out of which 36.3% had children under the age of 18 living with them, 50.0% were married couples living together, 21.9% had a female householder with no husband present, and 21.2% were non-families. 20.5% of all households were made up of individuals, and 8.9% had someone living alone who was 65 years of age or older. The average household size was 2.60 and the average family size was 2.94.

In the CDP, the population was spread out, with 26.6% under the age of 18, 7.7% from 18 to 24, 26.1% from 25 to 44, 24.8% from 45 to 64, and 14.8% who were 65 years of age or older. The median age was 38 years. For every 100 females, there were 99.5 males. For every 100 females age 18 and over, there were 93.1 males.

The median income for a household in the CDP was $24,107, and the median income for a family was $22,292. Males had a median income of $23,393 versus $20,375 for females. The per capita income for the CDP was $11,827. About 17.9% of families and 21.7% of the population were below the poverty line, including 36.9% of those under age 18 and 26.3% of those age 65 or over.

== Education ==
The community is in the Peñasco Independent School District.
