= Vadito, New Mexico =

- CDP
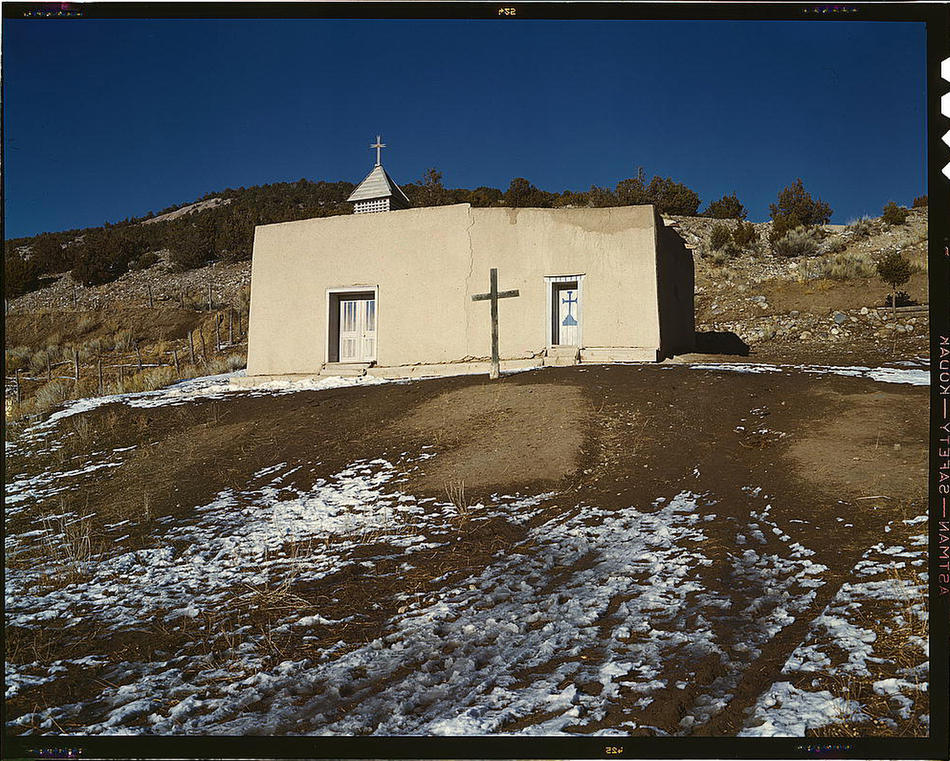
- Vadito Chapel, 1943, photo by John Collier for the Farm Security Administration.

- Location of Vadito, New Mexico

- Location in the United States
- Coordinates: 36°11′35″N 105°40′31″W
- Country: United States
- State: New Mexico
- County: Taos

Area
  - Total: 0.86 sq mi (2.23 km^{2})
  - Land: 0.86 sq mi (2.23 km^{2})
  - Water: 0 sq mi (0.00 km^{2})
- Elevation: 7,441 ft (2,268 m)

Population (2020)
  - Total: 258
  - Density: 299.4/sq mi (115.58/km^{2})
- Time zone: UTC-7 (Mountain (MST))
  - Summer (DST): UTC-6 (MDT)
- ZIP code: 87579
- Area code: 575
- FIPS code: 35-81520
- GNIS feature ID: 2409385

Vadito is a census-designated place (CDP) in southern Taos County, New Mexico, United States. It is on the scenic High Road to Taos. As of the 2020 census, Vadito had a population of 258.

== Geography ==
According to the United States Census Bureau, the CDP has a total area of 0.9 square mile (2.2 km^{2}), all land.

== Demographics ==
Historical population
Census	Pop.	Note	%±
2020	258		—
U.S. Decennial Census

As of the census of 2010, there were 270 people, 108 households, and 74 families residing in the CDP. The population density was 300.0 inhabitants per square mile (115.8/km^{2}). There were 133 housing units at an average density of 147.8 per square mile (57.1/km^{2}). The racial makeup of the CDP was 60.0% White, 0.7% Native American, 28.5% from other races, and 10.7% from two or more races. Hispanic or Latino of any race were 92.2% of the population.

There were 108 households, out of which 31.5% had children under the age of 18 living with them, 47.2% were married couples living together, 15.7% had a female householder with no husband present, and 31.5% were non-families. 25.0% of all households were made up of lone individuals with almost half, 12.0%, being 65 years of age or older. The average household size was 2.50 and the average family size was 3.01. The percentage of renters was only 15.7%, with the rest of the householders owning their own homes. 18.8% of the available housing was vacant.

In the CDP, the population was spread out, with 26.3% aged 19 and under, 22.2% from 20 to 39, 29.6% from 40 to 59, and 24.4% who were 60 years of age or older. The median age was 42 years. The median age for females was 3.5 years older than males. For every 100 females, there were 97.1 males.

As of 2000, the median income for a household in the CDP was $16,875, and the median income for a family was $20,625. Males had a median income of $31,875 versus $4,375 for females. The per capita income for the CDP was $9,481. About 41.1% of families and 35.8% of the population were below the poverty line, including 52.8% of those under the age of eighteen and 8.1% of those 65 or over.

== Education ==
The community is in the Peñasco Independent School District.
