= Peñasco, New Mexico =

- CDP
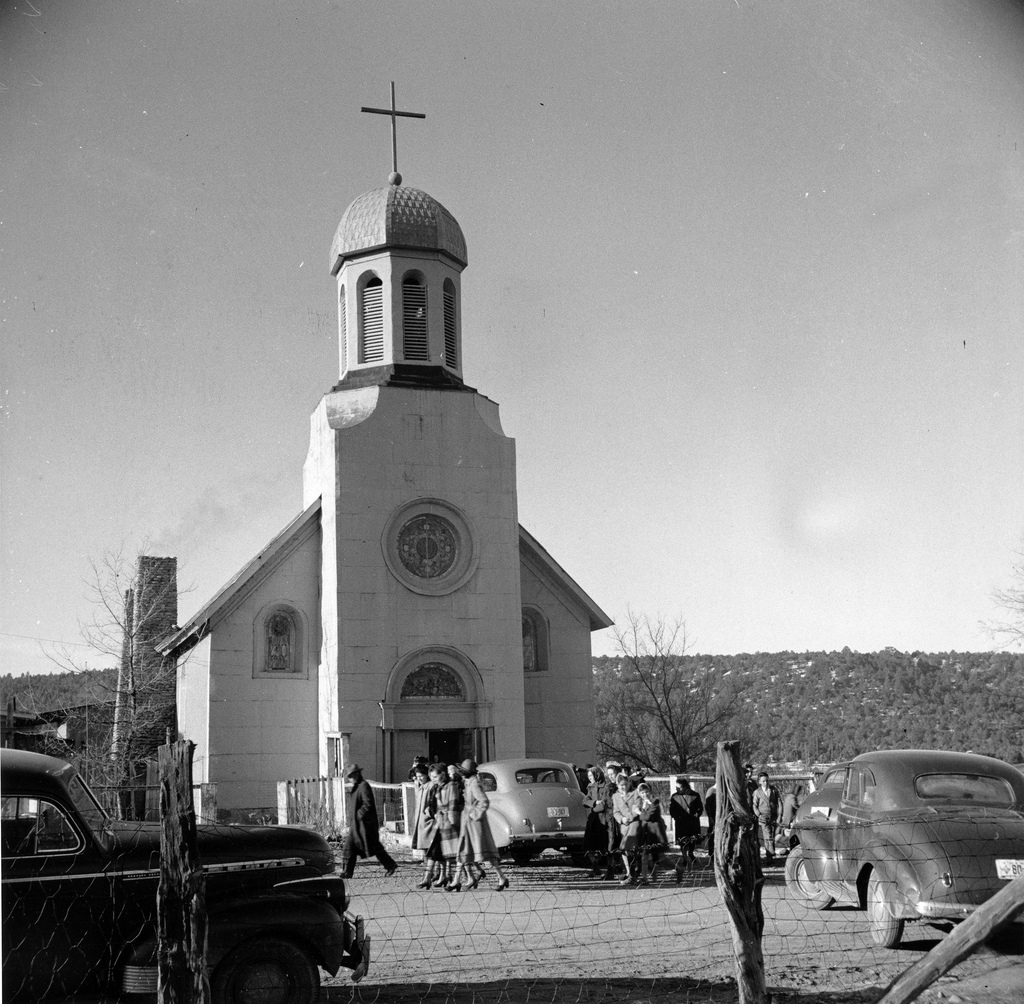
- Church in Peñasco, 1943

- Location of Peñasco, New Mexico

- Location in the United States
- Coordinates: 36°10′13″N 105°41′27″W
- Country: United States
- State: New Mexico
- County: Taos

Area
  - Total: 1.22 sq mi (3.15 km^{2})
  - Land: 1.22 sq mi (3.15 km^{2})
  - Water: 0 sq mi (0.00 km^{2})
- Elevation: 7,645 ft (2,330 m)

Population (2020)
  - Total: 474
  - Density: 389.7/sq mi (150.48/km^{2})
- Time zone: Mountain (MST)
- ZIP Code: 87553
- Area code: 575
- FIPS code: 35-55900
- GNIS feature ID: 2409051

Peñasco is a census-designated place (CDP) in Taos County, New Mexico. It is located along the scenic High Road to Taos. As of the 2020 census, Peñasco had a population of 474.

== Geography ==
According to the United States Census Bureau, the CDP has a total area of 1.2 square miles (3.1 km^{2}), all land.

== Demographics ==
Historical population
Census	Pop.	Note	%±
2020	474		—
U.S. Decennial Census

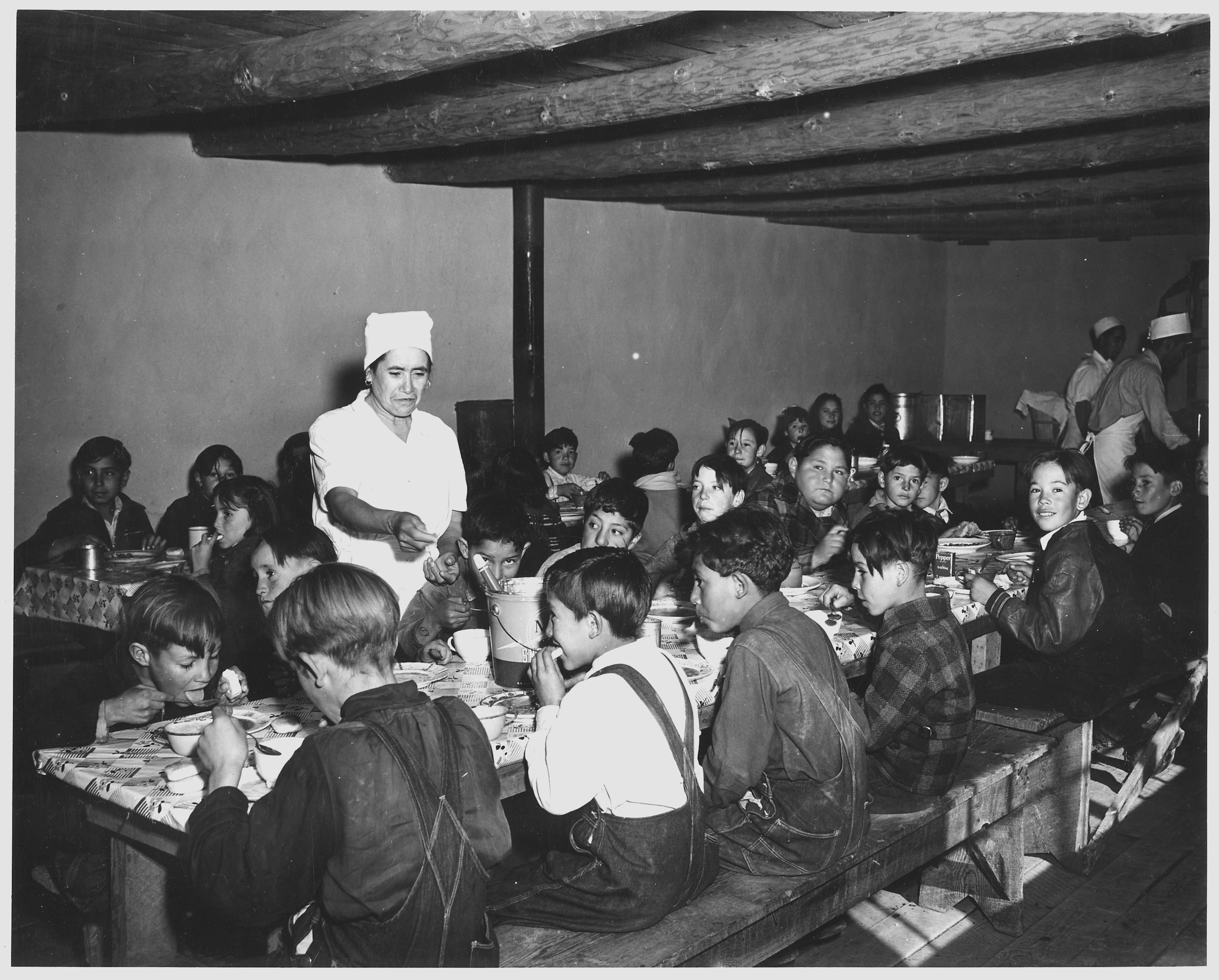
The hot lunch, school at Peñasco. 1941

At the 2000 census there were 572 people, 227 households, and 165 families in the CDP. The population density was 474.9 inhabitants per square mile (183.4/km^{2}). There were 272 housing units at an average density of 225.8 per square mile (87.2/km^{2}). The racial makeup of the CDP was 11.54% White, 0.70% African American, 1.40% Native American, 0.17% Pacific Islander, 82.34% from other races, and 3.85% from two or more races. Hispanic or Latino of any race were 91.26%.

Of the 407 households 39.8% had children under the age of 18 living with them, 49.3% were married couples living together, 16.3% had a female householder with no husband present, and 27.3% were non-families. 24.2% of households were one person and 7.5% were one person aged 65 or older. The average household size was 2.52 and the average family size was 2.96.

The age distribution was 29.9% under the age of 18, 7.0% from 18 to 24, 28.5% from 25 to 44, 24.3% from 45 to 64, and 10.3% 65 or older. The median age was 34 years. For every 100 females there were 91.3 males. For every 100 females age 18 and over, there were 91.0 males.

The median household income was $23,588 and the median family income was $26,733. Males had a median income of $31,389 versus $21,607 for females. The per capita income for the CDP was $11,564. About 21.1% of families and 21.0% of the population were below the poverty line, including 23.8% of those under age 18 and 19.6% of those age 65 or over.

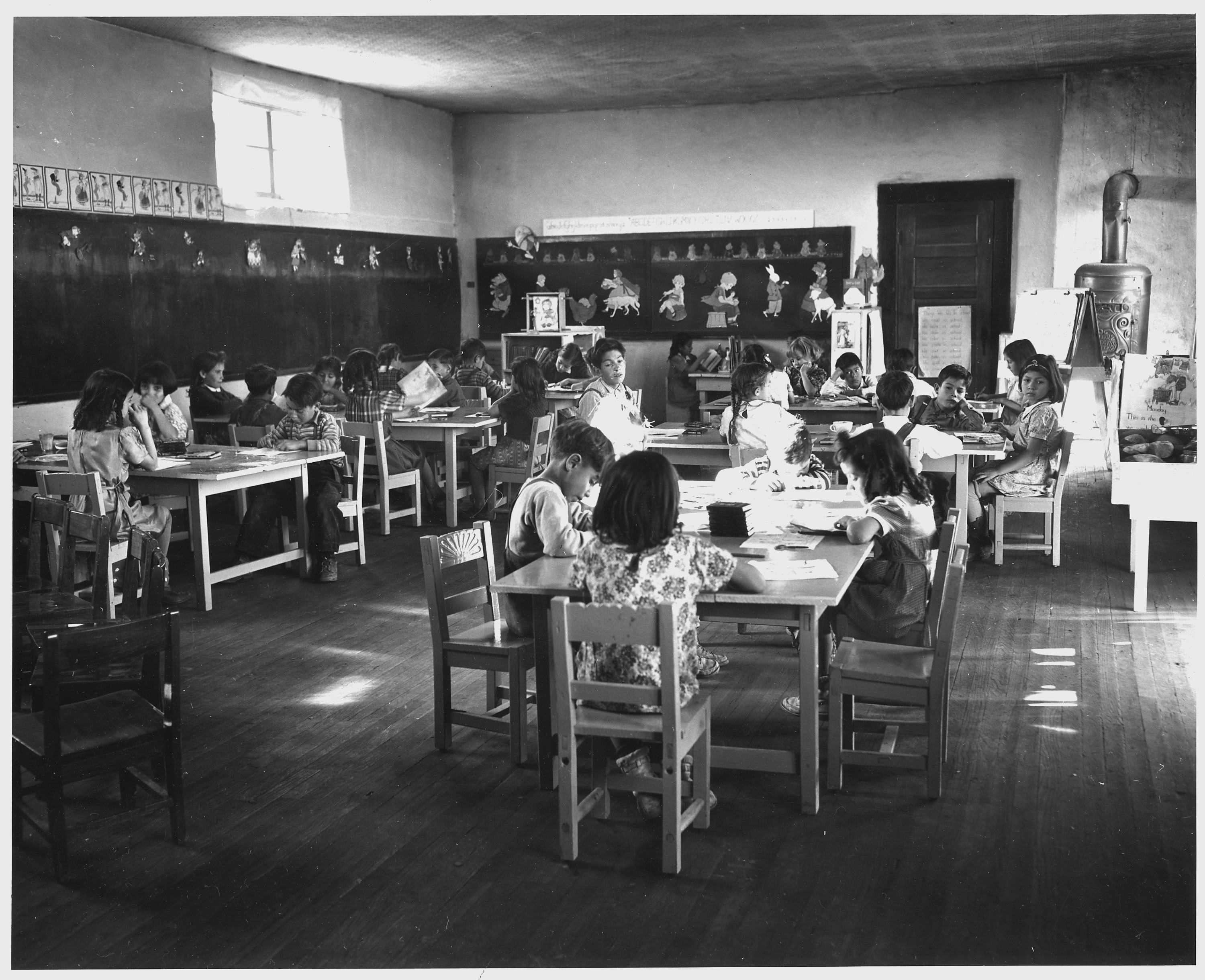

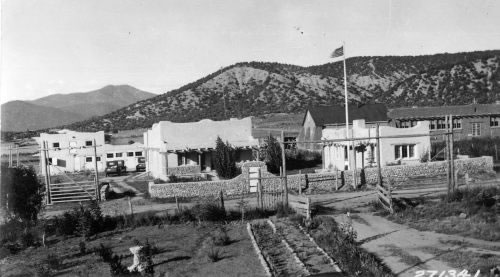
Peñasco Ranger St

== Education ==
The community is in the Peñasco Independent School District.
