= Raven Explorer =

Raven Explorer may refer to:

- Raven Explorer I, a single seat American autogyro
- Raven Explorer II, a two-seat American autogyro
