= New Mexico State Road 230 =

State highway in New Mexico, United States

State Road 230

Route information
- Maintained by NMDOT
- Length: 4.824 mi (7.763 km)

Major junctions
- South end: NM 150 near Taos
- North end: NM 150 near Taos

Location
- Country: United States
- State: New Mexico
- Counties: Taos

Highway system
- New Mexico State Highway System; Interstate; US; State; Scenic
← NM 229	→ NM 231

State Road 230 (NM 230) is a 4.824-mile-long (7.763 km) state highway in the US state of New Mexico. NM 230's southern terminus is at NM 150 in El Prado, north of Taos, passing through Valdez before reaching its northern terminus is at NM 150 in Arroyo Seco.

== Major intersections ==
The entire route is in Taos County.

Location	mi	km	Destinations	Notes
	0.000	0.000	NM 150	Southern terminus
	4.824	7.763	NM 150	Northern terminus
1.000 mi = 1.609 km; 1.000 km = 0.621 mi
