= Raven 1300 SVS Turbo =

American aircraft engine

1300 SVS Turbo
- Type: Aircraft engine
- National origin: United States
- Manufacturer: Raven Redrives

The Raven 1300 SVS Turbo is an American aircraft engine, designed and produced by Raven Redrives of El Prado, New Mexico for use in ultralight and homebuilt aircraft.

The company seems to have gone out of business in 2017 and production ended.

== Design and development ==
The engine is a turbocharged four-cylinder four-stroke, in-line, 1,300 cc (79.3 cu in) displacement, liquid-cooled, automotive conversion, gasoline engine design, with a poly V belt reduction drive with a reduction ratio of 2.11:1. It employs electronic ignition and produces 115 hp (86 kW) at 5700 rpm.

A normally-aspirated version was also built, producing 90 hp (67 kW).

== Specifications (1300 SVS Turbo) ==
Data from Tacke

=== General characteristics ===
- Type: Four-cylinder, four-stroke, turbocharged aircraft engine
- Bore: 74 mm (2.9 in)
- Stroke: 77 mm (3.0 in)
- Displacement: 1,300 cc (79.3 cu in)
- Dry weight: 80 kg (176.4 lb)

=== Components ===
- Fuel type: gasoline
- Cooling system: liquid
- Reduction gear: poly V belt

=== Performance ===
- Power output: 115 hp (86 kW)

== See also ==
Related lists

- List of aircraft engines
