= New Mexico State Road 150 =

State highway in New Mexico, United States

State Road 150
- NM 150 highlighted in red

Route information
- Maintained by NMDOT
- Length: 14.547 mi (23.411 km)

Major junctions
- South end: US 64 / NM 522 north near El Prado
- North end: Taos Ski Valley

Location
- Country: United States
- State: New Mexico
- Counties: Taos

Highway system
- New Mexico State Highway System; Interstate; US; State; Scenic
← NM 147	→ NM 152

State Road 150 (NM 150) is a 14.5-mile-long (23.3 km) state highway in the US state of New Mexico. NM 150's southern terminus is at U.S. Route 64 (US 64) and NM 522 at what is locally referred to as the “old blinking light,” and the northern terminus is at the end of state maintenance at Taos Ski Valley.

The highway travels through El Prado and Arroyo Seco before reaching Carson National Forest as it winds up to Taos Ski Valley, following the Rio Hondo. Three national forest campgrounds and four trailheads are located along it.

Due to the number of driveways on the southern end of the roadway between El Prado and Arroyo Seco, residents in 2016 successfully lobbied for the speed limit to be lowered to 45 from 55.

A non-motorized trail along the eastern right-of-way is proposed for the same stretch.

== Major intersections ==
The entire route is in Taos County.

Location	mi	km	Destinations	Notes
El Prado	0.000	0.000	US 64 / NM 522 north	Southern terminus, southern terminus of NM 522
	2.681	4.315	NM 230 north	Southern terminus of NM 230
	6.894	11.095	NM 230 south	Northern terminus of NM 230
	14.547	23.411	Taos Ski Valley main entrance	Northern terminus
1.000 mi = 1.609 km; 1.000 km = 0.621 mi
