= Raven Explorer I =

American autogyro

Explorer I

General information
- Type: Autogyro
- National origin: United States
- Manufacturer: Raven Rotorcraft
- Status: Production completed
- Number built: At least one

History
- Introduction date: 1990s
- Variant: Raven Explorer II

The Raven Explorer I is an American autogyro that was designed and produced by Raven Rotorcraft of Boulder Colorado and later El Prado, New Mexico, introduced in the 1990s. Now out of production, when it was available the aircraft was supplied as a kit, for amateur construction.

The Explorer I is no longer available as the company has moved to develop the two-seat Raven Rotor-Plane.

== Design and development ==
The Explorer I was designed as a low-cost utilitarian autogyro. It complies with the US FAR 103 Ultralight Vehicles rules, including the category's maximum empty weight of 254 lb (115 kg). The aircraft has a standard empty weight of 254 lb (115 kg). It features a single main rotor, a single-seat open cockpit without a windshield and conventional landing gear. A cockpit fairing was a factory option. The acceptable power range is 45 to 65 hp (34 to 48 kW) and the standard engine used is the twin cylinder, air-cooled, two-stroke, single-ignition 45 hp (34 kW) 2si 460 engine in tractor configuration. The cabin width is 28 in (71 cm).

The aircraft fuselage is made from a combination of welded 4130 steel tube and bolted-together aluminum tubing. Its two-bladed rotor has a diameter of 23 ft (7.0 m). The aircraft has a typical empty weight of 254 lb (115 kg) and a gross weight of 564 lb (256 kg), giving a useful load of 310 lb (140 kg). With full fuel of 5 U.S. gallons (19 L; 4.2 imp gal) the payload for the pilot and baggage is 280 lb (130 kg).

The standard day, sea level, no wind, take off with a 45 hp (34 kW) engine is 250 ft (76 m) and the landing roll is 50 ft (15 m).

The manufacturer estimated the construction time from the supplied kit as 100 hours.

== Specifications (Explorer I) ==
Data from Purdy

General characteristics

- Crew: one
- Length: 15 ft 0 in (4.57 m)
- Empty weight: 254 lb (115 kg)
- Gross weight: 564 lb (256 kg)
- Fuel capacity: 5 U.S. gallons (19 L; 4.2 imp gal)
- Powerplant: 1 × 2si 460 twin cylinder, air-cooled, two-stroke, single-ignition aircraft engine, 45 hp (34 kW)
- Main rotor diameter: 23 ft 0 in (7.01 m)
- Main rotor area: 415 sq ft (38.6 m^{2})
- Propellers: 2-bladed composite, ground adjustable

Performance

- Maximum speed: 65 mph (105 km/h, 56 kn)
- Range: 100 mi (160 km, 87 nmi)
- Service ceiling: 12,000 ft (3,700 m)
- Disk loading: 1.4 lb/sq ft (6.8 kg/m^{2})

== See also ==
- List of rotorcraft
