= Explorer Two =

Explorer Two, Explorer II, Explorer 2, or variation, may refer to:

== Vehicles ==
- Explorer II (1935), a manned high-altitude balloon from National Geographic and the U.S. Army that set the manned high altitude record
- MS Explorer II (cruise ship) (1989), a cruise ship
- Raven Explorer II, a U.S. autogyro kitplane
- JUST Explorer II, a Chinese scientific research autonomous underwater vehicle
- Foday Explorer II, a Chinese SUV

== Other uses ==
- Explorer 2 (1958), a failed U.S. Army exploratory satellite
- Rolex Explorer II (1971), a wristwatch developed for explorers and adventurers
- Charter Arms Explorer II pistol, a .22 calibre pistol

== See also ==
- Explorer (disambiguation)
- Explorer 11 (1961), a NASA space telescope
- R/V Lake Explorer II (1966), a hydrographic survey ship
