= Raven Rotorcraft =

Aircraft manufacturer

- Company type: Privately held company
- Industry: Aerospace
- Founded: 1990s
- Headquarters: El Prado, New Mexico, United States
- Products: Kit aircraft
- Website: www.raven-rotor.com

Raven Rotorcraft (also called Raven Redrives and Raven Rotorcraft & Redrives, Inc.) is an American aircraft manufacturer based in El Prado, New Mexico and formerly of Boulder Colorado. The company specializes in the design and manufacture of autogyros in the form of kits for amateur construction and reduction drives for three and four cylinder Geo Metro and Honda automotive engines for aircraft use.

The company produced a very simple single-seat autogyro design in the 1990s, the Raven Explorer I for the US FAR 103 Ultralight Vehicles rules. This was followed by the Raven Explorer II two-seater for the US Experimental - Amateur-built aircraft category. By the 2010s these were both out of production. The company is engaged in developing a new winged autogyro, designated the Raven Rotor-Plane, for the cargo, search and rescue and aerial survey roles.

The company also produces complete aircraft engines for installation in homebuilt aircraft, such as the Raven 1000 UL, 1300 SVS Turbo and 1600 SV.

== Aircraft ==
Summary of aircraft built by Raven Rotorcraft
Model name	First flight	Number built	Type
Raven Explorer I	1990s	At least one	Single seat autogyro
Raven Explorer II	1990s		Two seat autogyro
Raven Rotor-Plane	pending	none	Two seat winged autogyro
