= Raven 1600 SV =

American aircraft engine

1600 SV
- Type: Aircraft engine
- National origin: United States
- Manufacturer: Raven Redrives

The Raven 1600 SV is an American aircraft engine, designed and produced by Raven Redrives of El Prado, New Mexico for use in ultralight and homebuilt aircraft.

The company seems to have gone out of business in 2017 and production ended.

== Design and development ==
The engine is a four-cylinder four-stroke, in-line, 1,590 cc (97.0 cu in) displacement, liquid-cooled, automotive conversion, gasoline engine design, with a poly V belt reduction drive with a reduction ratio of 2.36:1. It employs electronic ignition and produces 110 hp (82 kW) at 5500 rpm.

== Specifications (1600 SV) ==
Data from Tacke

=== General characteristics ===
- Type: Four-cylinder, four-stroke aircraft engine
- Bore: 75 mm (3.0 in)
- Stroke: 90 mm (3.5 in)
- Displacement: 1,590 cc (97.0 cu in)
- Dry weight: 97 kg (213.8 lb)

=== Components ===
- Fuel type: gasoline
- Cooling system: liquid
- Reduction gear: poly V belt

=== Performance ===
- Power output: 110 hp (82 kW)

== See also ==
Related lists

- List of aircraft engines
