= New Mexico State Road 515 =

State highway in New Mexico, United States

State Road 515
- NM 515 highlighted in red

Route information
- Maintained by NMDOT
- Length: 2.1 mi (3.4 km)

Major junctions
- South end: NM 522 near Questa
- North end: Red River Fish Hatchery

Location
- Country: United States
- State: New Mexico
- Counties: Taos

Highway system
- New Mexico State Highway System; Interstate; US; State; Scenic
← NM 514	→ NM 516

State Road 515 (NM 515) is a 2.1-mile-long (3.4 km) state highway in the US state of New Mexico. NM 515's southern terminus is at NM 522 southwest of Questa, and the northern terminus is at Red River Fish Hatchery.

== Major intersections ==
The entire route is in Taos County.

Location	mi	km	Destinations	Notes
	0.000	0.000	NM 522	Southern terminus
	2.100	3.380	Red River Fish Hatchery	Northern terminus
1.000 mi = 1.609 km; 1.000 km = 0.621 mi
