= Taos Municipal Schools =

School district in Taos, New Mexico, United States

Location
- 310 Camino de la Placita; Taos, New Mexico Northern New Mexico; Taos, New Mexico

District information
- Type: Public
- Motto: "All students will be prepared to succeed as productive individuals in society."
- Grades: K-12
- Superintendent: Dr. Lillian Torrez

Students and staff
- Students: 3,248 (2010-2011)

Other information
- Website: www.taosschools.org

Taos Municipal Schools (TMS) or Taos Municipal School District (TMSD) is a school district based in Taos, New Mexico, United States. Taos Municipal Schools has a total area of 637 square miles (1,650 km^{2}). The school district has a total of six schools. The district has one high school, one middle school, three elementary schools, and one magnet school.

== History ==
Beginning in 1997 the number of students declined. Due to elderly people making up an increasing percentage of area residents and a post-1999 drop in births in Taos County, in 2022 the district anticipated an upcoming decline in the number of students.

== Service area ==
The district serves the communities of Taos, Arroyo Hondo, Arroyo Seco, Ranchos de Taos, San Cristobal, Talpa, Taos Pueblo, and almost all of Taos Ski Valley. It also includes Cañon, Ranchitos, El Prado, Des Montes, Llano Quemado, and Cordillera.

== Schools ==
Secondary schools

- Taos High School (Taos)
- Taos Middle School (Taos)

Elementary schools

- Arroyos del Norte Elementary School (Unincorporated area)
- Enos Garcia Elementary School (Taos)
  - In 2011 it had 602 students. In 2020 this was down to 440.
- Ranchos Elementary School (Ranchos de Taos)
  - In 2011 it had 459 students. In 2020 this was down to 279.

Magnet schools

- Taos Cyber Magnet School
