= KTAO =

Radio station in Taos, New Mexico

- Taos, New Mexico; United States
- Frequency: 101.9 MHz
- Branding: Ktaos

Programming
- Format: Adult album alternative

Ownership
- Owner: Taos Communications Corporation

History
- First air date: 1991
- Former call signs: KXRT, KVNM
- Call sign meaning: "Taos"

Technical information
- Licensing authority: FCC
- Facility ID: 64602
- Class: C1
- ERP: 1,200 watts
- HAAT: 852 meters (2797 feet)
- Transmitter coordinates: 36°14′48″N 105°39′15″W

Links
- Public license information: Public file; LMS
- Webcast: Listen live
- Website: www.ktao.com

KTAO ("KTAOS 101.9") is a solar-powered FM radio station licensed to serve Taos, New Mexico. The station is owned by Taos Communications Corporation. It airs an adult album alternative music format. The station was assigned the KTAO call letters by the Federal Communications Commission on October 6, 1986. The station is an affiliate of the syndicated Pink Floyd program "Floydian Slip."

== Radio ==
=== History ===
==== KTAO (1968–1974), Los Gatos, CA ====
KTAO 95.3 FM, was an FM station in Los Gatos, owned by former Random House editor Bill Ryan (William Harvey Ryan III) and Lorenzo Milam.

==== K-TAOS 101.9FM, Taos, NM ====
KTAO’s transmitter was in the town of Taos prior to 1991. Following FCC approval to increase to 1,200 watts, a new transmitter site was needed. A new transmitter was located at 10,800-foot Picuris Peak, which does not have grid power. According to former owner Brad Hockmeyer, solar power was the only option. The high-altitude location of its transmitter gives KTAO rimshot broadcast coverage from as far south as Albuquerque, New Mexico, and north into southern Colorado. This broadcast area is the largest of any solar-powered station in the world. On June 8, 2010, Brad Hockmeyer sold KTAO and the Solar Center to Aidan Bain, gaining controlling interest of KTAOS Solar Radio 101.9 FM, and the KTAOS Solar Center, a full bar, restaurant, and music venue attached to the operating radio station office building.

KTAO is the largest solar powered radio station in the United States. It was featured in Episode 8, "Sky's The Limit", of the History Channel program Life After People.

=== Awards ===
New Mexico Broadcasters Association (2011)

NMBA Station of the Year

Public Service Announcement: “Holiday Shop Local Campaign”

Station Promotional Announcement: “Testimonial Campaign”

Complete Newscast: Paddy Mac in the Mornings

Single Topic News: Brad Hockmeyer interview with Tom Udall

30 Second Commercial: “Gay Pride Taos – Gayest Dog Wash EVER”

30 Second Commercial: “Taos Solar Music Festival 2010”

NonSports Talk Show: Paddy Mac in the Mornings Valentine’s Day Matchmaking

Sports Talk Show: Tigerbeat

Best of Taos (2011)

Best DJ: Paddy Mac

Best Live Music Venue: The KTAOS Solar Center

== Solar Center ==
The KTAO studio offices are located five miles north of the town of Taos in El Prado. Outside the studio and offices is a festival-style performance venue with a tent allowing KTAO to host events year-round. The site is located equidistant from Taos Ski Valley and the Historic Town Center, and beneath the tallest peak in New Mexico. The concert space adjoins the home of two radio stations, solar powered KTAOS 101.9 FM and Luna 103.7 FM. Food services are available to concert-goers.
