= San Cristobal, New Mexico =

- Census-designated place
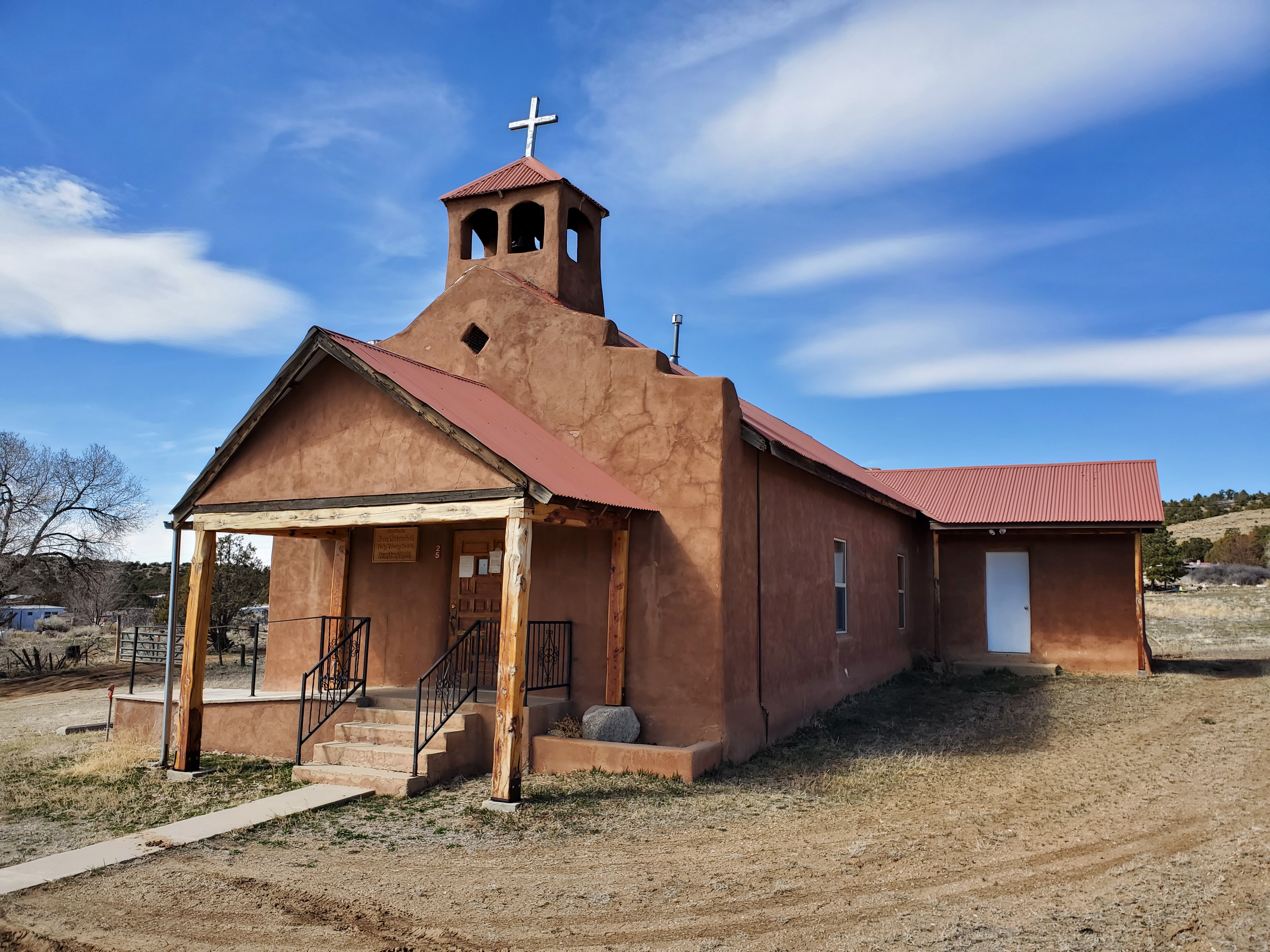
- Capilla de San Cristobal in San Cristobal, New Mexico

- Location within New Mexico
- Coordinates: 36°36′59″N 105°37′54″W
- Country: United States
- State: New Mexico
- County: Taos

Area
  - Total: 6.88 sq mi (17.83 km^{2})
  - Land: 6.88 sq mi (17.83 km^{2})
  - Water: 0 sq mi (0.00 km^{2})
- Elevation: 7,799 ft (2,377 m)

Population (2020)
  - Total: 206
  - Density: 29.9/sq mi (11.55/km^{2})
- Time zone: UTC-7 (Mountain (MST))
  - Summer (DST): UTC-6 (MDT)
- ZIP code: 87564
- Area code: 575
- GNIS feature ID: 2629124

San Cristobal is a census-designated place in Taos County, New Mexico. Its population was 273 as of the 2010 census, and in the 2020 census the population was 206 persons with a total number of households at 49. San Cristobal has a post office with ZIP code 87564, which opened on February 16, 1932.

== Geography ==
According to the U.S. Census Bureau, the community has an area of 6.886 square miles (17.83 km^{2}), all land.

== Demographics ==
In San Cristobal, New Mexico, the top 5 ethnic groups by percentage are White (Hispanic), White (Non-Hispanic), Other (Hispanic), American Indian & Alaska Native (Non-Hispanic), and Black or African American (Non-Hispanic).

Historical population
Census	Pop.	Note	%±
2020	206		—
U.S. Decennial Census

== Education ==
It is within Taos Municipal Schools, which operates Taos High School.
