= Costilla, New Mexico =

- Census-designated place
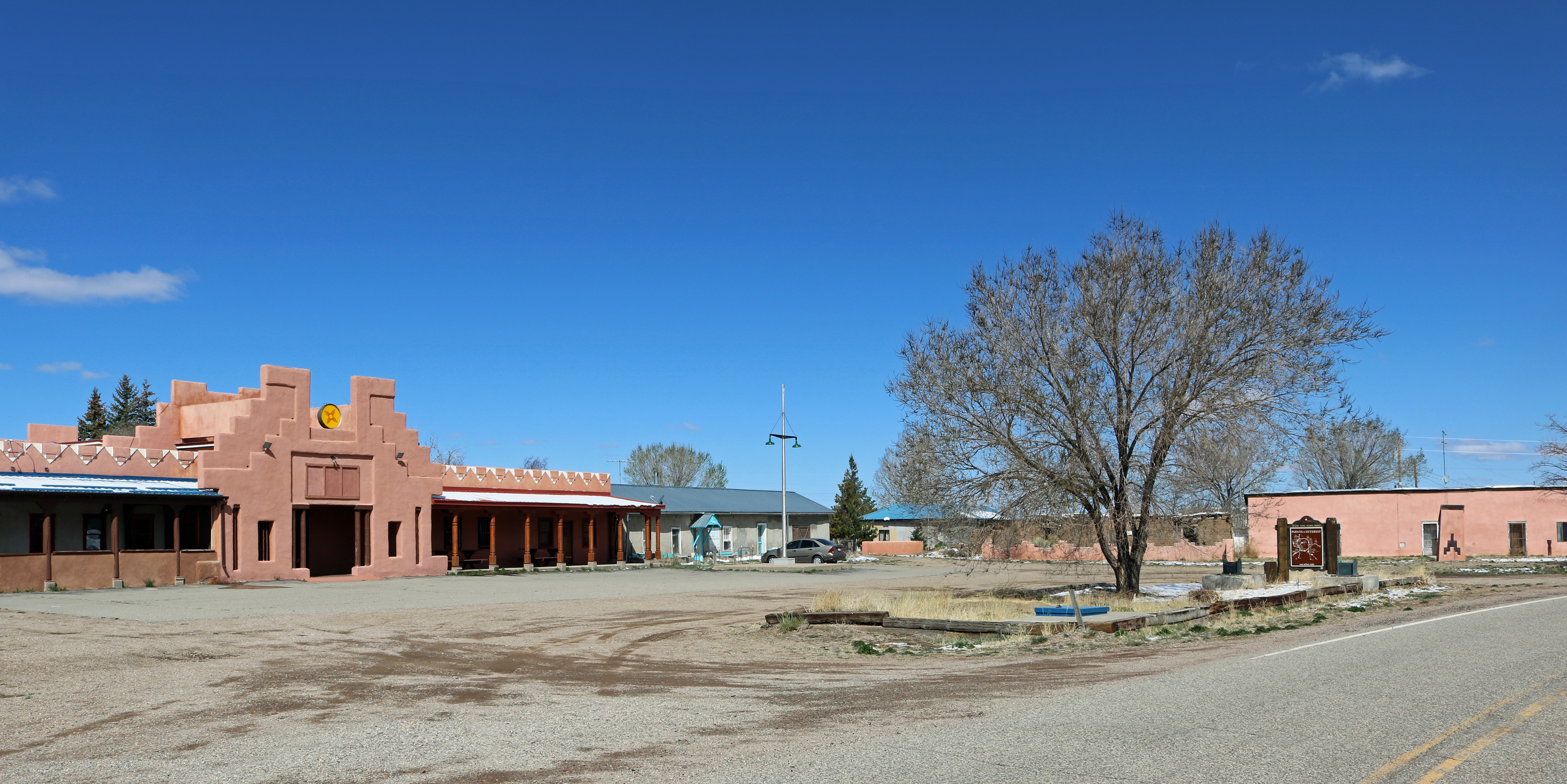
- La Plaza de Arriba in Costilla.

- Location within New Mexico
- Coordinates: 36°58′43″N 105°32′07″W
- Country: United States
- State: New Mexico
- County: Taos

Area
  - Total: 3.03 sq mi (7.84 km^{2})
  - Land: 3.03 sq mi (7.84 km^{2})
  - Water: 0 sq mi (0.00 km^{2})
- Elevation: 7,805 ft (2,379 m)

Population (2020)
  - Total: 177
  - Density: 58.5/sq mi (22.59/km^{2})
- Time zone: UTC-7 (Mountain (MST))
  - Summer (DST): UTC-6 (MDT)
- ZIP code: 87524
- Area code: 575
- GNIS feature ID: 2629108

Costilla is a census-designated place in Taos County, New Mexico, United States. As of the 2020 census, Costilla had a population of 177. Costilla has a post office with ZIP code 87524. State roads 196 and 522 intersect in the community.

== History ==
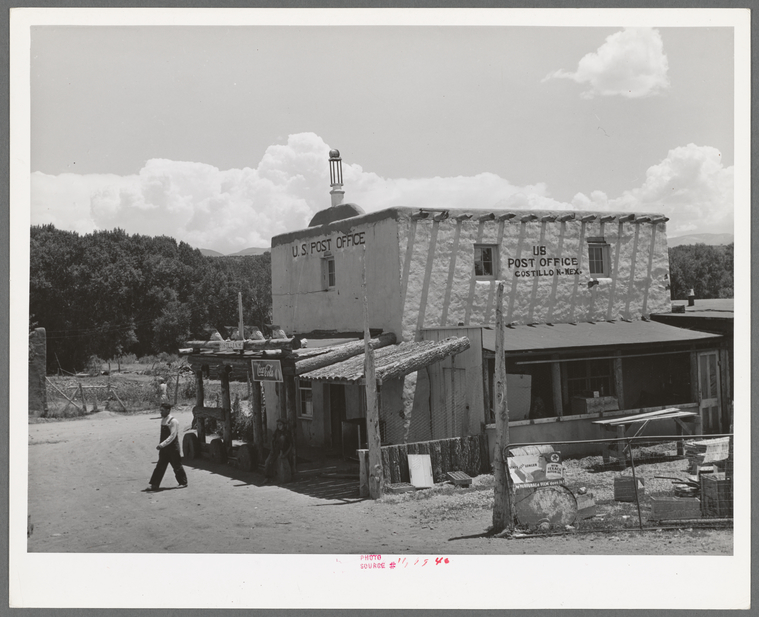
Post office. Costilla, New Mexico. 1940.

The village of Costilla was originally known as San Miguel, named after its church. On November 1, 1861, the Territory of Colorado created 17 original counties, with San Miguel as the original seat of Costilla County, Colorado Territory. When its post office opened on November 13, 1862, the village selected the new name Costilla, perhaps in recognition of its new status. In 1863, county voters decided to move the county seat 17 miles (27 km) north to San Luis. In 1869, a U.S. government survey determined that Costilla was actually located in the Taos County, New Mexico Territory. It wasn't until October 21, 1872, that the village post office was officially renamed Costilla, New Mexico Territory.

== Geography ==
According to the U.S. Census Bureau, the community has an area of 3.056 square miles (7.92 km^{2}), all land.

== Demographics ==
Historical population
Census	Pop.	Note	%±
2020	177		—
U.S. Decennial Census

== Education ==
It is in the Questa Independent Schools school district.

== See also ==
- List of census-designated places in New Mexico
