= New Mexico State Road 196 =

State highway in New Mexico, United States

State Road 196
- NM 196 highlighted in red

Route information
- Maintained by NMDOT
- Length: 11.659 mi (18.763 km)

Major junctions
- South end: Costilla Ski Basin
- North end: NM 522 in Costilla

Location
- Country: United States
- State: New Mexico
- Counties: Taos

Highway system
- New Mexico State Highway System; Interstate; US; State; Scenic
← NM 195	→ NM 197

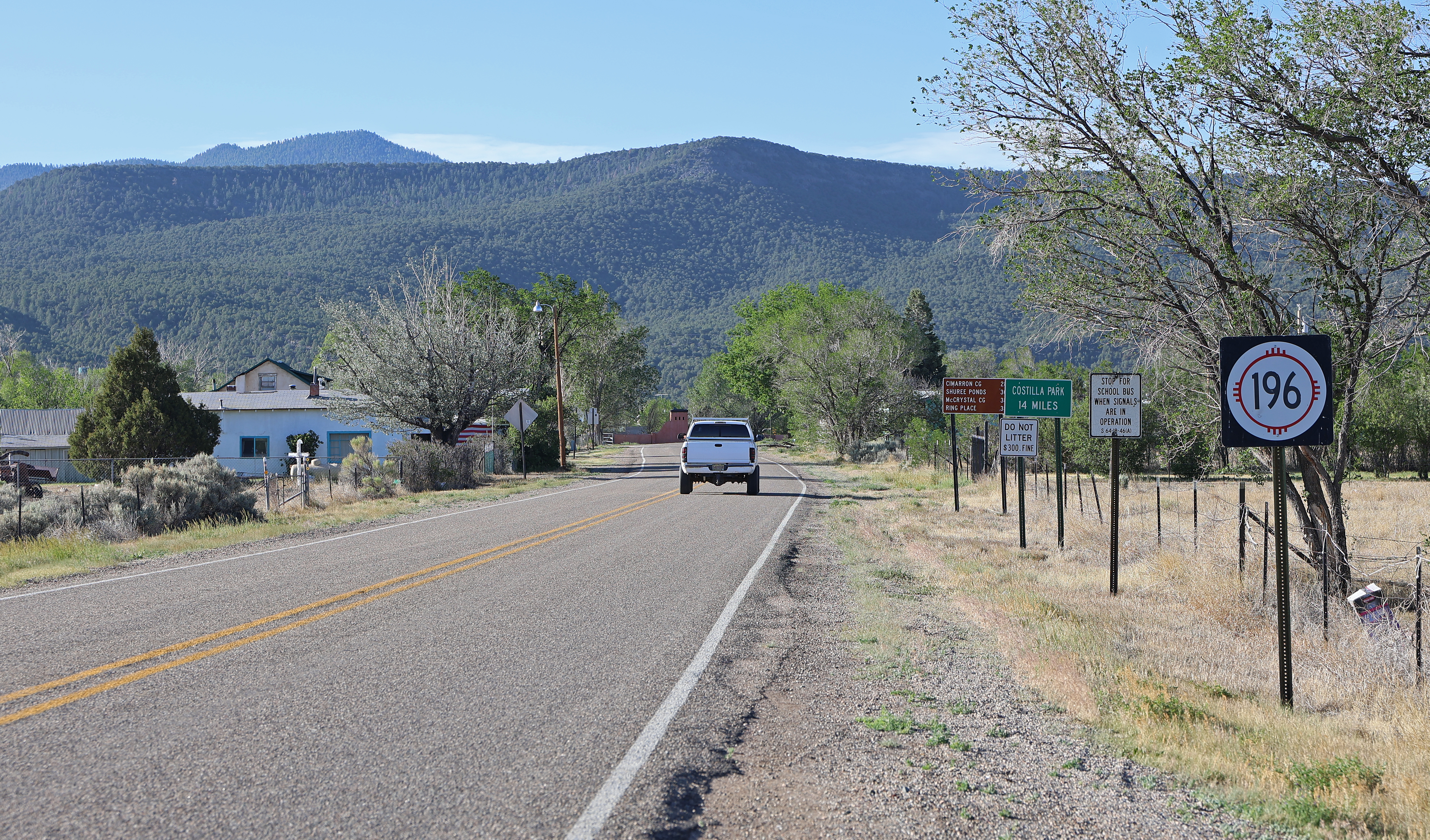
Looking south southwest along the road from a point near its northern terminus in Costilla, New Mexico

State Road 196 (NM 196) is a 11.659-mile-long (18.763 km) state highway in the US state of New Mexico. NM 196's southern terminus is at Costilla Ski Basin, and the northern terminus is at NM 522 in Costilla.

== Major intersections ==
The entire route is in Taos County.

Location	mi	km	Destinations	Notes
	0.000	0.000	Costilla Ski Basin	Southern terminus
Costilla	11.659	18.763	NM 522	Northern terminus
1.000 mi = 1.609 km; 1.000 km = 0.621 mi
