= Valdez, New Mexico =

Unincorporated community in New Mexico, United States

Valdez
- Unincorporated community
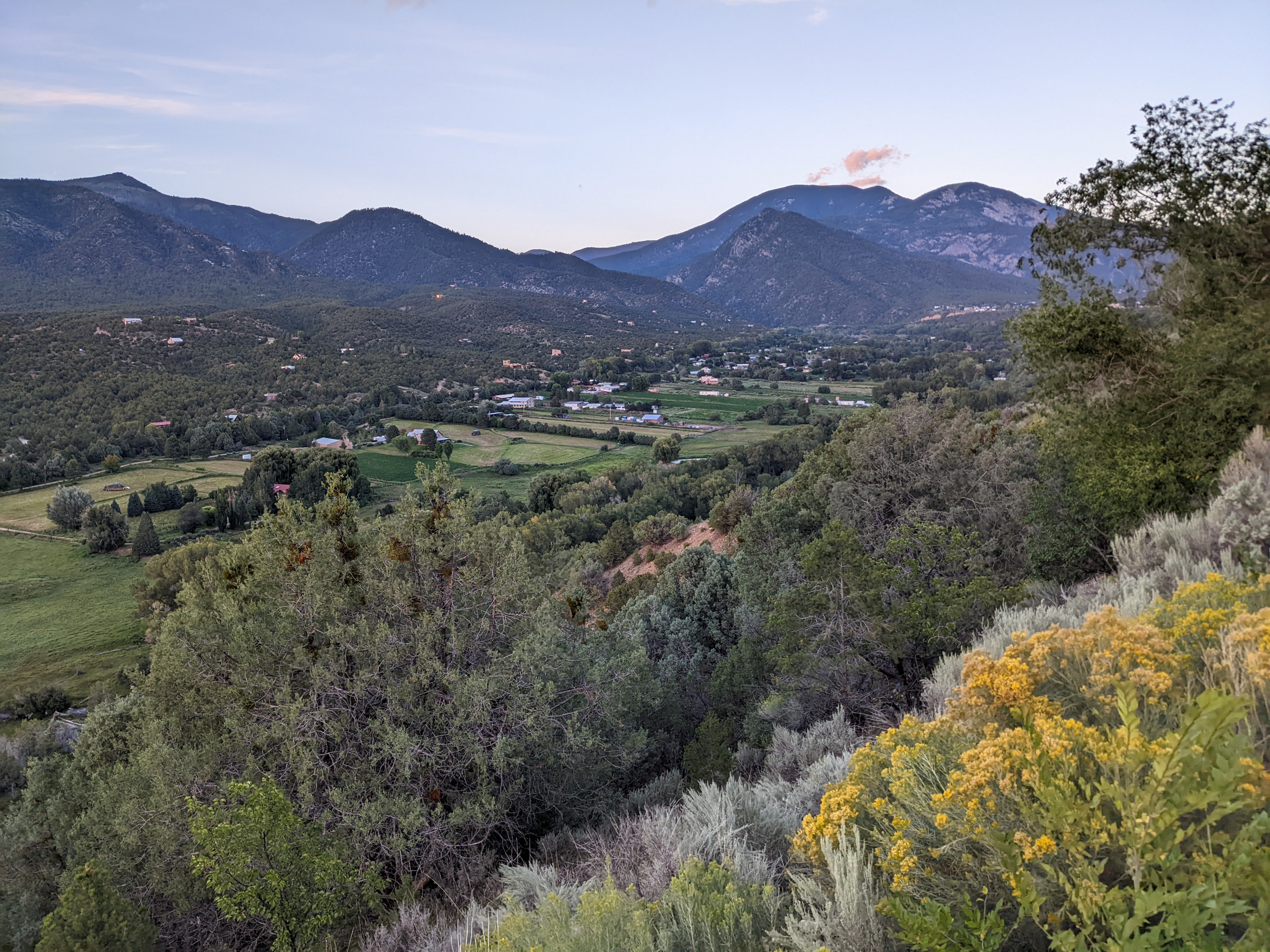
- Looking out over Valdez, New Mexico from Rim Rd on 18 August 2022

- Location within the state of New Mexico Valdez (the United States)
- Coordinates: 36°32′04″N 105°35′02″W
- Country: United States
- State: New Mexico
- County: Taos
- Elevation: 7,428 ft (2,264 m)
- Time zone: UTC-7 (Mountain (MST))
  - Summer (DST): UTC-6 (MDT)
- ZIP codes: 87580
- Area code: 575
- GNIS feature ID: 912021

Valdez is an unincorporated community located in Taos County, New Mexico, United States situated along the Rio Hondo. The community is located on New Mexico State Road 230, 8.8 miles (14.2 km) north of Taos. Valdez had a post office until August 28, 2010; it still has its own ZIP code, 87580.

== Gallery ==
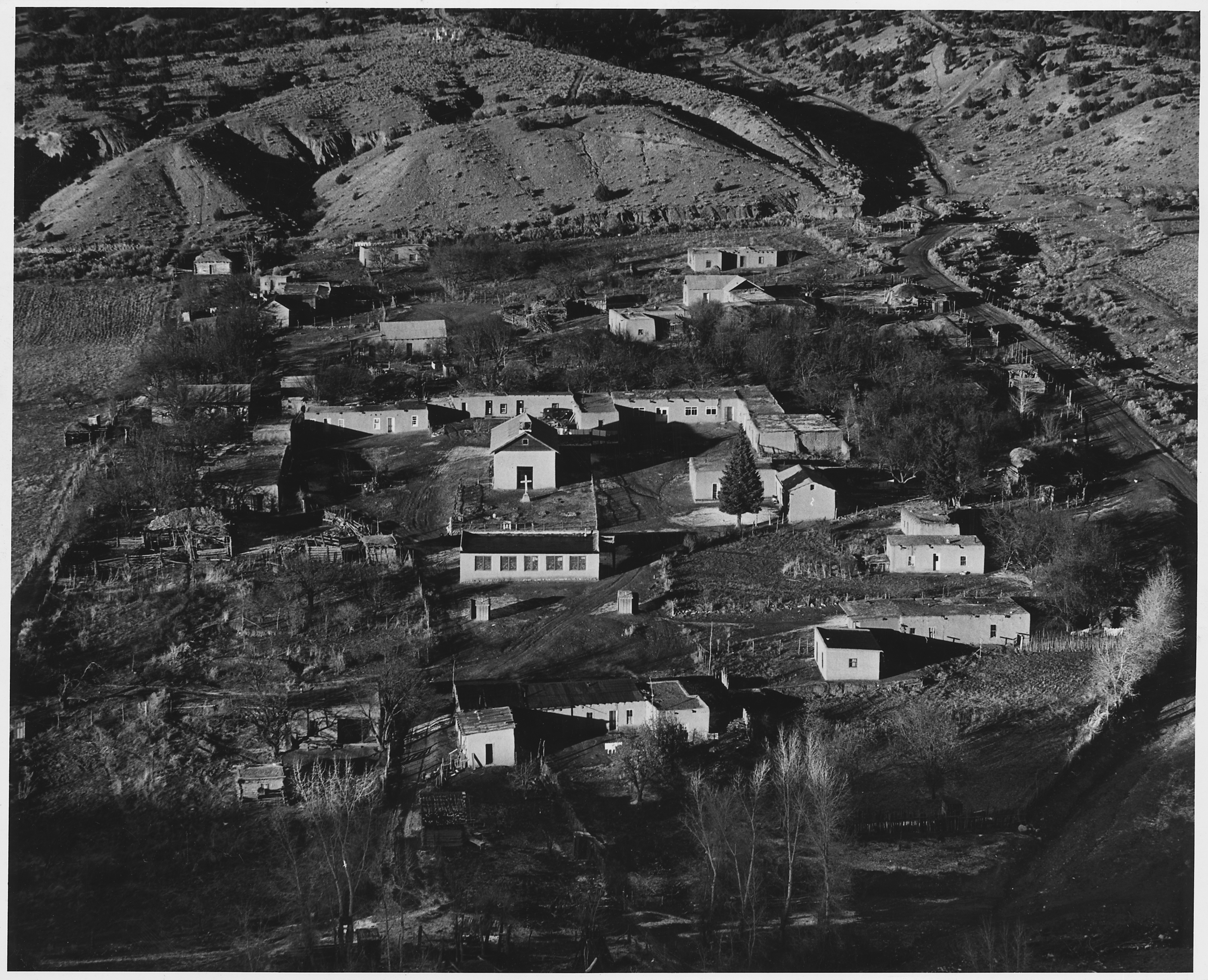
View of Valdez in 1941. Note layout of houses in plaza around the church, a style that is common to all of the oldest villages.

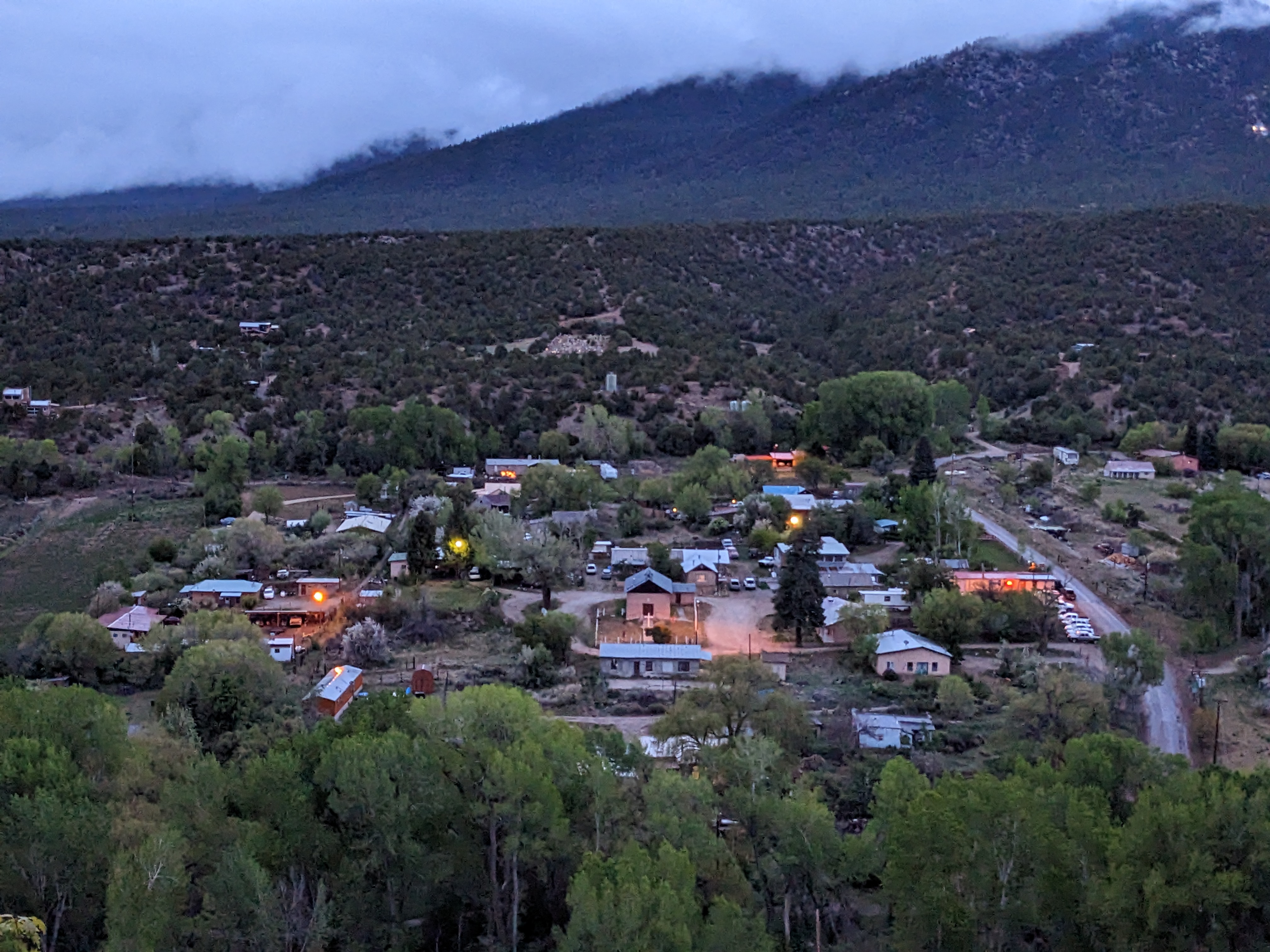
View of Valdez on 19 May 2023.
