= Taos Pueblo, New Mexico =

- CDP
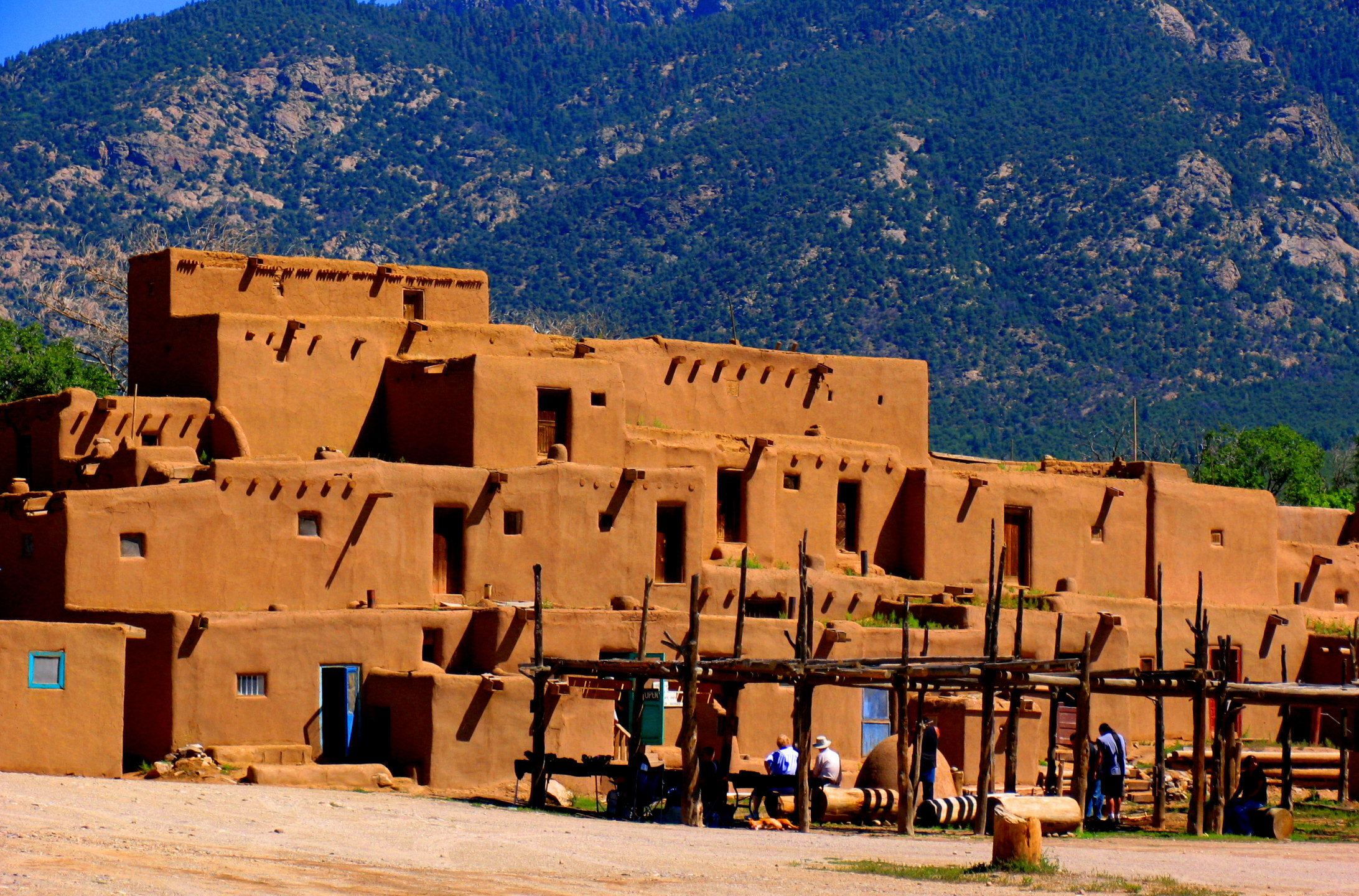
- Taos Pueblo

- Location of Taos Pueblo, New Mexico

- Location in the United States
- Coordinates: 36°26′55″N 105°33′14″W
- Country: United States
- State: New Mexico
- County: Taos

Area
  - Total: 15.60 sq mi (40.40 km^{2})
  - Land: 15.60 sq mi (40.40 km^{2})
  - Water: 0 sq mi (0.00 km^{2})
- Elevation: 7,120 ft (2,170 m)

Population (2020)
  - Total: 1,196
  - Density: 77/sq mi (29.6/km^{2})
- Time zone: UTC−07:00 (Mountain (MST))
  - Summer (DST): UTC−06:00 (MDT)
- ZIP Code: 87571
- Area code: 575
- FIPS code: 35-76410
- GNIS feature ID: 0928824
- Website: www.taospueblo.com

Taos Pueblo is a census-designated place (CDP) in Taos County, New Mexico, United States, just north of Taos. As of the 2020 census, Taos Pueblo had a population of 1,196.

== Geography ==
Taos Pueblo is located at 36°26′55″N 105°33′14″W (36.448735, -105.553979). Rio Pueblo de Taos passes through Taos Pueblo.

According to the United States Census Bureau, the CDP has a total area of 15.6 square miles (40.5 km^{2}), all land.

== Government ==
The administration of the Pueblo of Taos in 2025 is:

- Governor: Edwin Conche
- Lieutenant Governor: Robert Espinosa

== Culture and history ==
Taos Pueblo is the only living Native American community designated both a World Heritage Site by UNESCO and a National Historic Landmark.

The multistoried Taos Pueblo adobe buildings have been continuously inhabited for over 1,000 years.

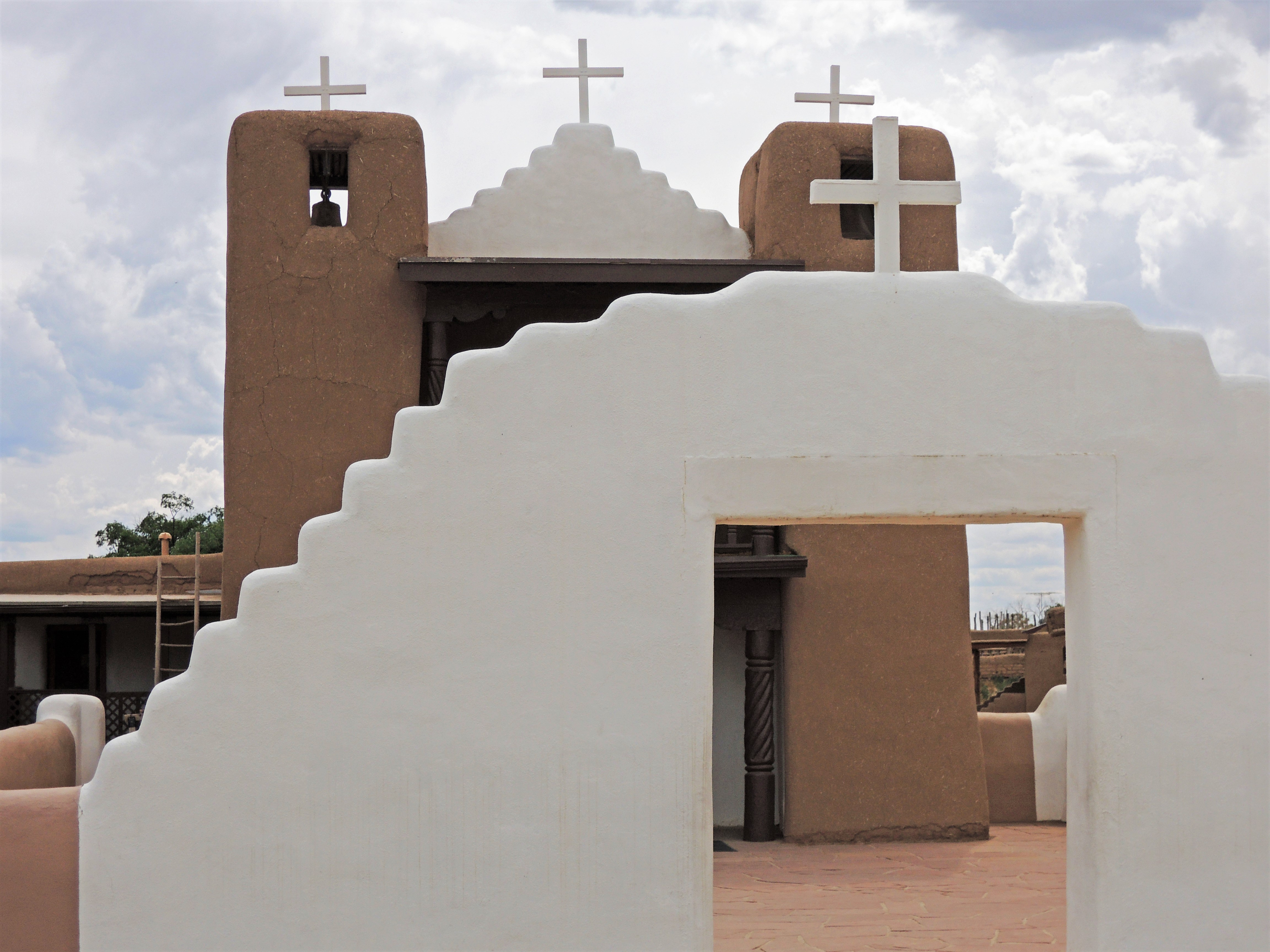
Taos Pueblo Church

== Demographics ==
Historical population
Census	Pop.	Note	%±
2020	1,196		—
U.S. Decennial Census

As of the census of 2000, there were 1,264 people, 441 households, and 316 families residing in the CDP. The population density was 80.9 inhabitants per square mile (31.2/km^{2}). There were 682 housing units at an average density of 43.6 per square mile (16.8/km^{2}).

The racial makeup of the CDP was 2.93% White, 95.02% Native American, 0.40% Pacific Islander, 0.32% from other races, and 1.34% from two or more races. Hispanic or Latino people of any race were 4.11% of the population.

=== Age ===
There were 441 households, out of which 29.5% had children under the age of 18 living with them, 39.0% were married couples living together, 20.6% had a female householder with no husband present, and 28.3% were non-families. 25.6% of all households were made up of individuals, and 9.3% had someone living alone who was 65 years of age or older. The average household size was 2.87 and the average family size was 3.39.

In the CDP, the population was spread out, with 26.1% under the age of 18, 8.5% from 18 to 24, 28.8% from 25 to 44, 22.1% from 45 to 64, and 14.5% who were 65 years of age or older. The median age was 36 years. For every 100 females, there were 102.6 males. For every 100 females age 18 and over, there were 103.0 males.

=== Income ===
The median income for a household in the CDP was $20,682, and the median income for a family was $23,867. Males had a median income of $19,861 versus $18,333 for females. The per capita income for the CDP was $10,002. About 27.4% of families and 31.6% of the population were below the poverty line, including 36.3% of those under age 18 and 38.0% of those age 65 or over.

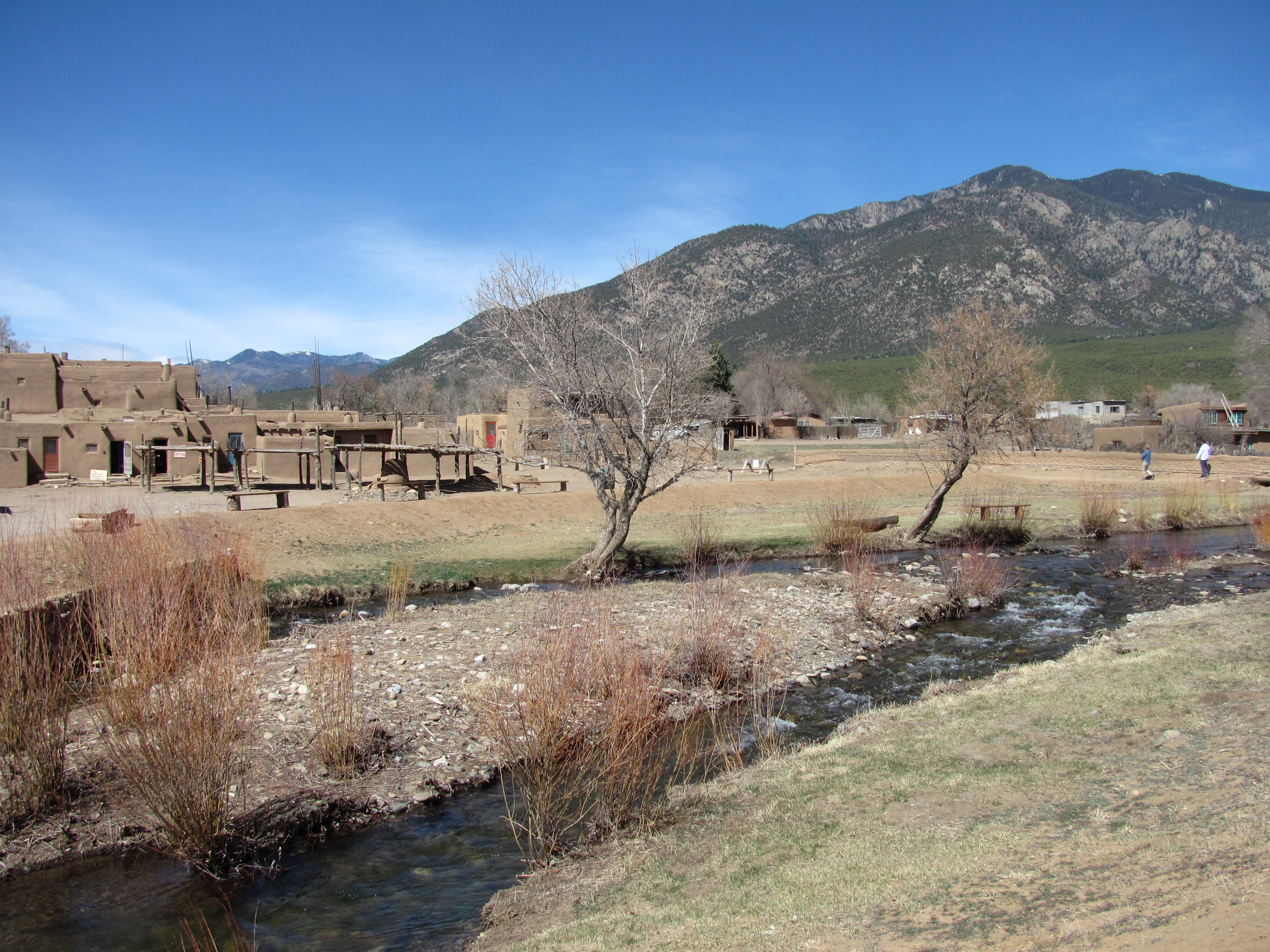
Landscape of Taos Pueblo, Rio Pueblo de Taos, and the Sangre de Cristo Mountains

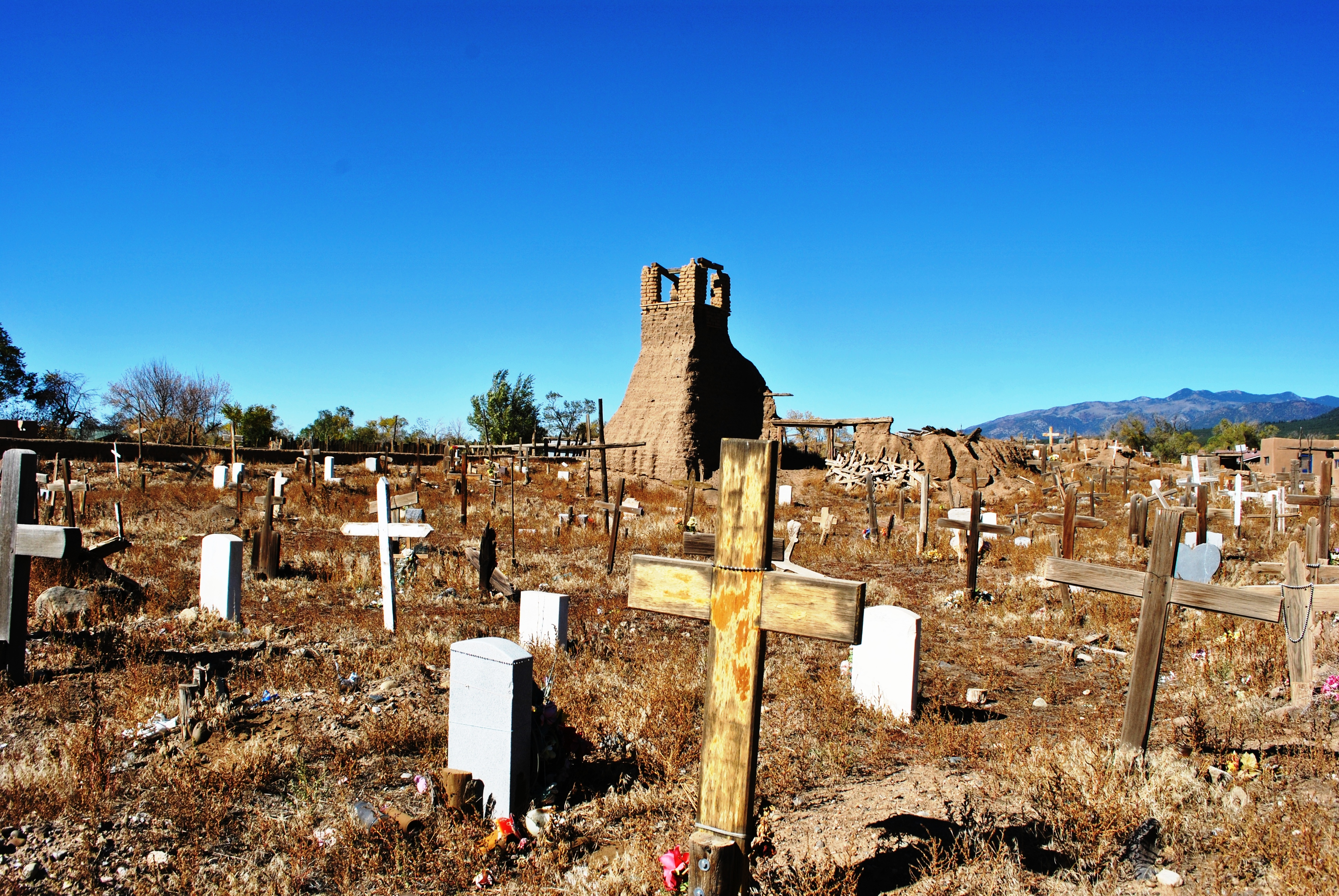
Taos Pueblo Cemetery

== Education ==
It is within Taos Municipal Schools, which operates Taos High School.

The Bureau of Indian Education-operated Taos Day School is in Taos Pueblo.

== See also ==
- Ancestral Puebloans
- Puebloan peoples
