= New Mexico State Road 522 =

State highway in New Mexico, United States

State Road 522
- NM 522 highlighted in red

Route information
- Maintained by NMDOT
- Length: 41.096 mi (66.138 km)

Major junctions
- South end: US 64 / NM 150 near Taos
- NM 38 in Questa
- North end: SH 159 at the Colorado state line in Costilla

Location
- Country: United States
- State: New Mexico
- Counties: Taos

Highway system
- New Mexico State Highway System; Interstate; US; State; Scenic
← NM 519	→ NM 523

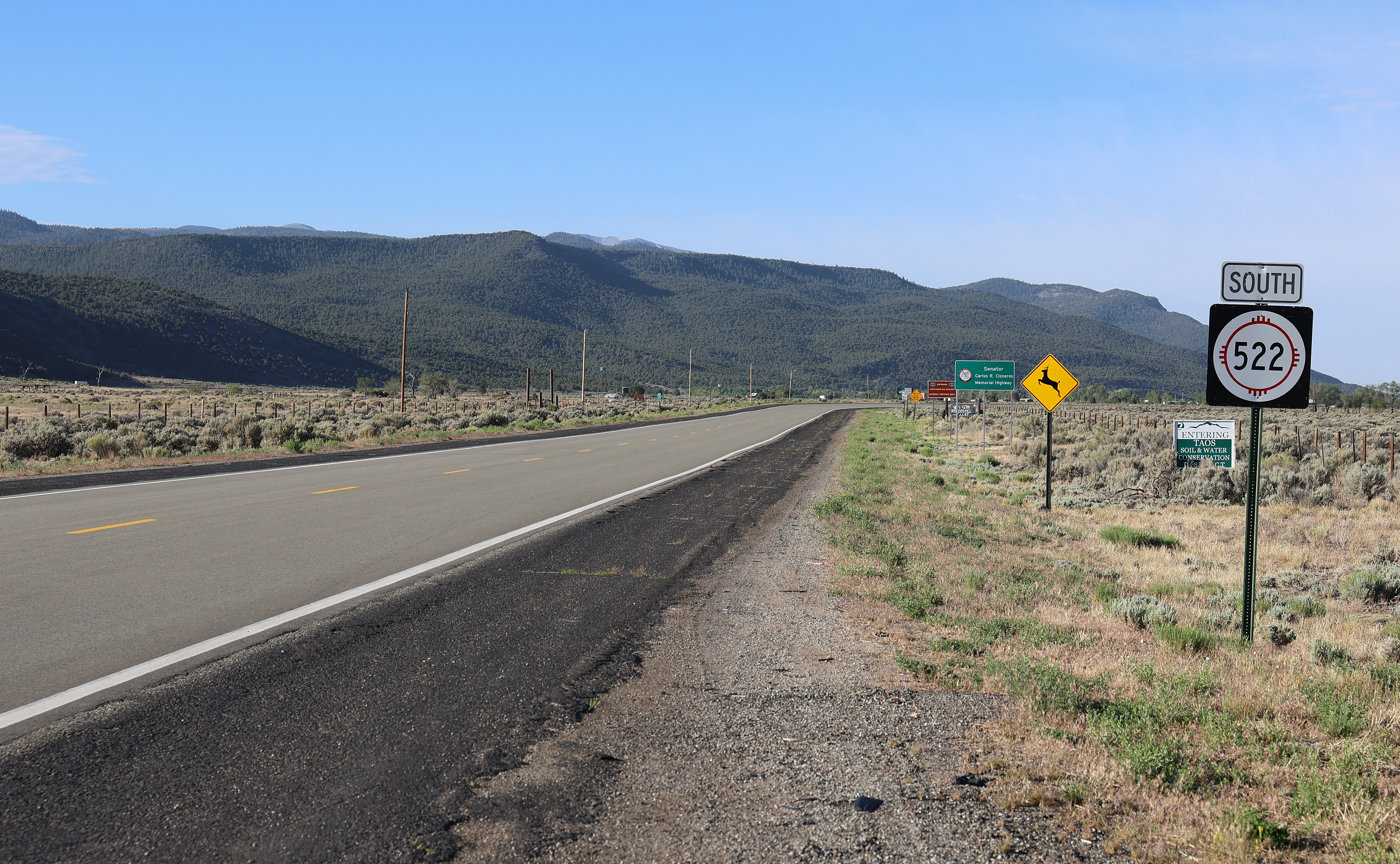
Looking south from the road's northern terminus at the Colorado border

State Road 522 (NM 522) is a 41.096-mile-long (66.138 km) state highway in far northern New Mexico. It was named the Senator Carlos R. Cisneros Memorial Highway, after the late Taos County Commissioner and state senator, in 2022.

Its southern terminus is in El Prado, NM, at U.S. Route 64 (US 64) and NM 150, at what is locally referred to as the “old blinking light” intersection, approximately four miles north of Taos. From there, the state road heads north through Arroyo Hondo and then Questa, where it has a junction with NM 38. It then continues north to Costilla before its northern terminus at the Colorado state line where the road becomes Colorado State Highway 159 (SH 159).

The highway, which is makes up a short portion of the Enchanted Circle Scenic Byway, loosely follows a portion of the Old Spanish National Historic Trail’s north branch. It also goes through an area within Carson National Forest between Arroyo Hondo and Questa.

== Major intersections ==
The entire route is in Taos County.

Location	mi	km	Destinations	Notes
El Prado	0.000	0.000	US 64 / NM 150 north	Southern terminus, southern terminus of NM 150
	16.575	26.675	NM 515 north	Southern terminus of NM 515
Questa	20.161	32.446	NM 38 east	Western terminus of NM 38
	22.760	36.629	NM 378 west	Eastern terminus of NM 378
Costilla	39.775	64.012	NM 196 south	Northern terminus of NM 196
	41.096	66.138	SH 159 – San Luis	Northern terminus
1.000 mi = 1.609 km; 1.000 km = 0.621 mi
