= Taos Day School =

Coordinates: 36.4346°N 105.5422°W

Location
- 200 Rotten Tree Rd; Taos Pueblo, Taos, New Mexico 87571; United States

Information
- School type: (BIE)-operated
- NCES District ID: 5900174
- NCES School ID: 590017400097
- Grades: K-8
- Website: https://tds.bie.edu/

Taos Day School is a Bureau of Indian Education (BIE)-operated K-8 school, located in Taos Pueblo, New Mexico, United States.

== History ==
In 1996 the school established a pen pal program for indigenous students worldwide, using the internet, in conjunction with the La Plaza Telecommunity Center.

Patricia Kessler started her term as principal c. 2000. Around that time, the school lacked key technology, and Kessler stated that a unified set of curricula had not yet been established.

In 2010, the school became the BIE school of the year.

Kessler retired in 2014.

Advanced ED accredited the school in 2015.

In 2015, Alfred E. Taylor became the principal.

== Operations ==
In 2010, the school had a designated reading coach and used the Reading First program.
