= Talpa, New Mexico =

Coordinates: 36°20′29.71″N 105°35′49.28″W

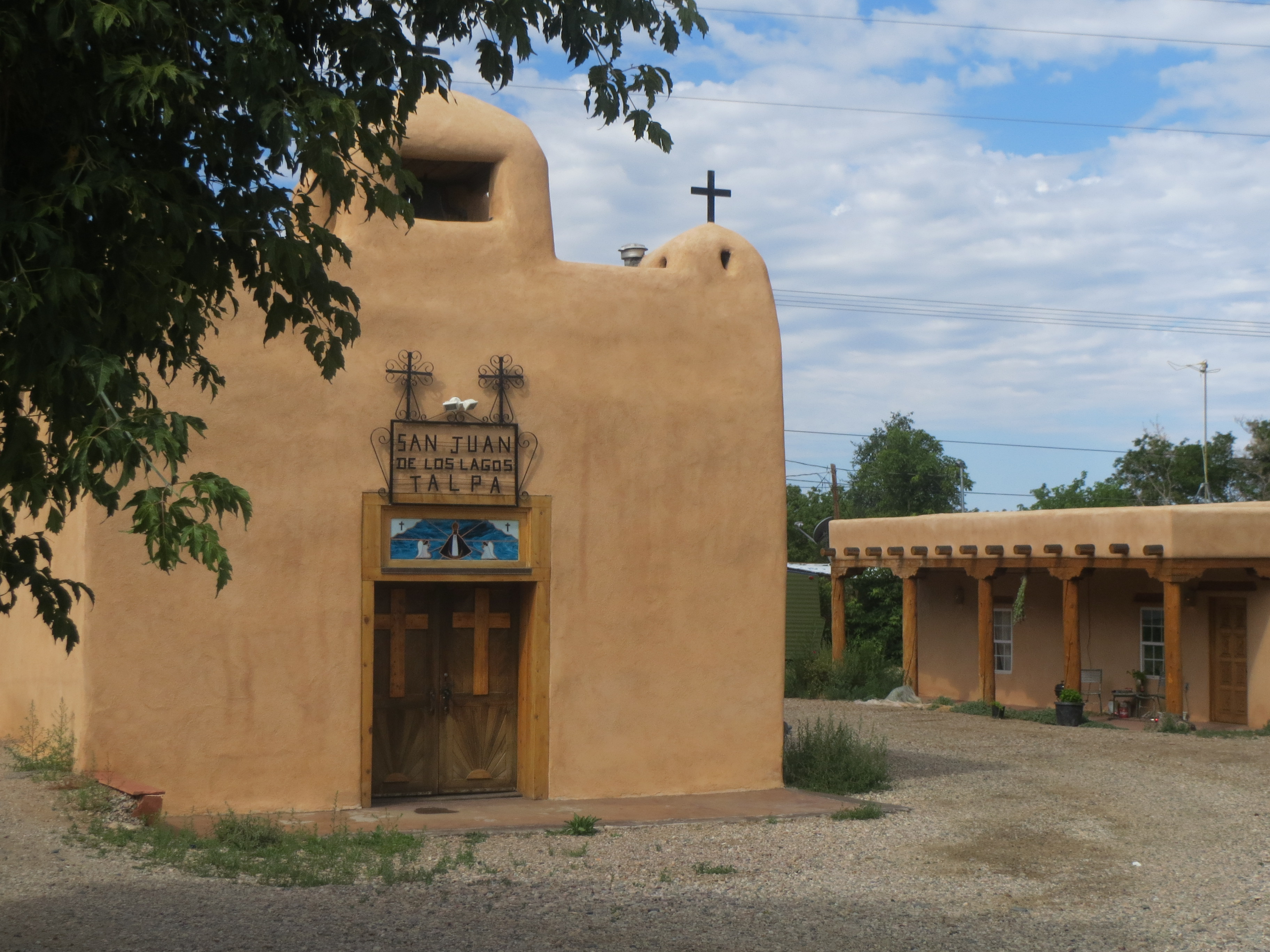
San Juan De Los Logos church, Talpa, New Mexico

Talpa is a settlement in Taos County, New Mexico, located 6 miles (10 kilometers) south of the town of Taos along New Mexico Highway 518. As of the 2020 census, Talpa had a population of 960.

== History ==
First named Rio Chiquito for the river running through the area, Talpa was settled during the early-18th century during the time that nearby Ranchos de Taos began to be settled. The settlement is on the old Spanish land grant of Don Cristobal de la Sena.

The name of the town may have been derived from the city of Talpa in Jalisco, Mexico or it may have been named for Señora Talpa Romero, of a prominent Taos family.

Circa 1820, a private chapel was built for the Duran family in Talpa along the Rio Chiquito. Juan Pedro Cruz (born about 1855) was a well-known weaver who supplied sarapes, embroidered bedspreads, and rugs to residents of the Taos Pueblo and local villages. Ponce de Leon Hot Springs, used by Native Americans and early Spanish settlers, are located near Talpa.

== Education ==
It is within Taos Municipal Schools, which operates Taos High School.

== Gallery ==
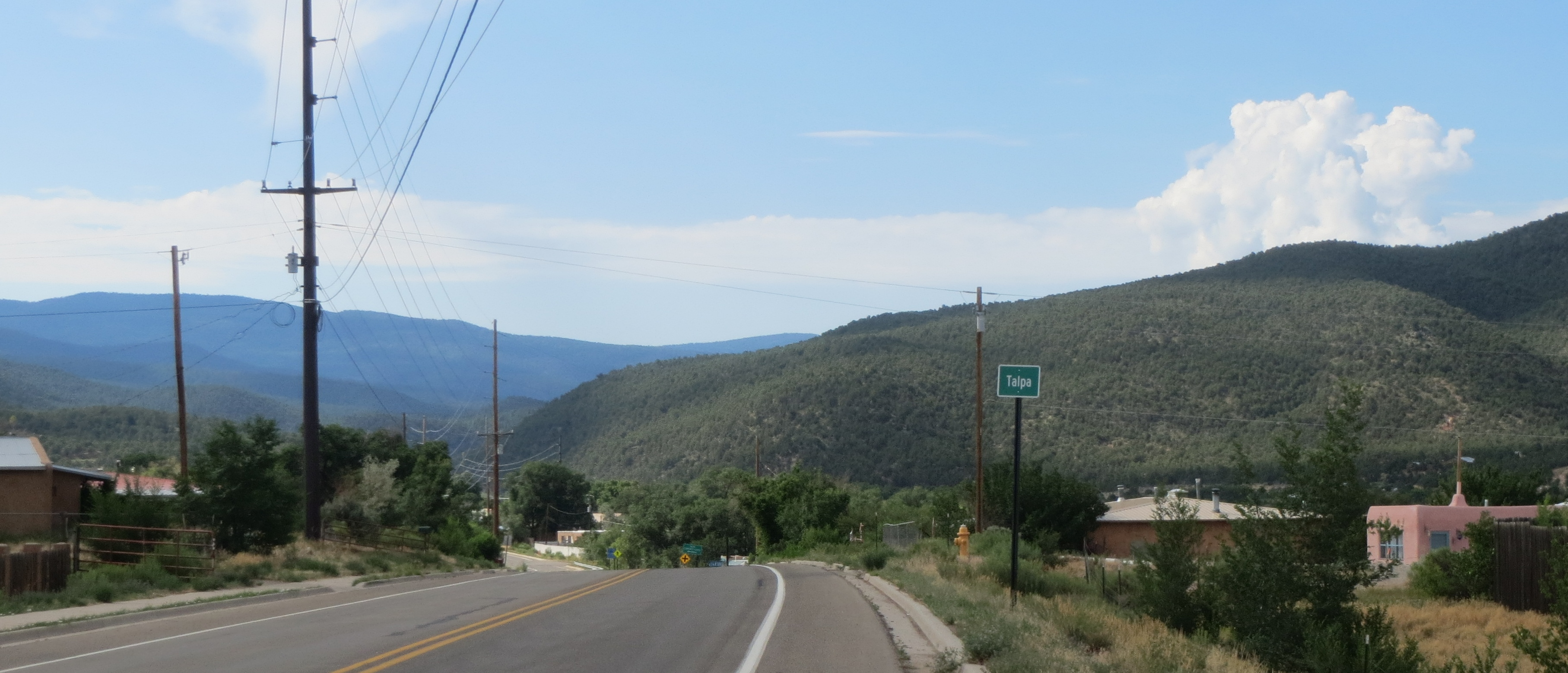
Entering Talpa from Ranchos de Taos

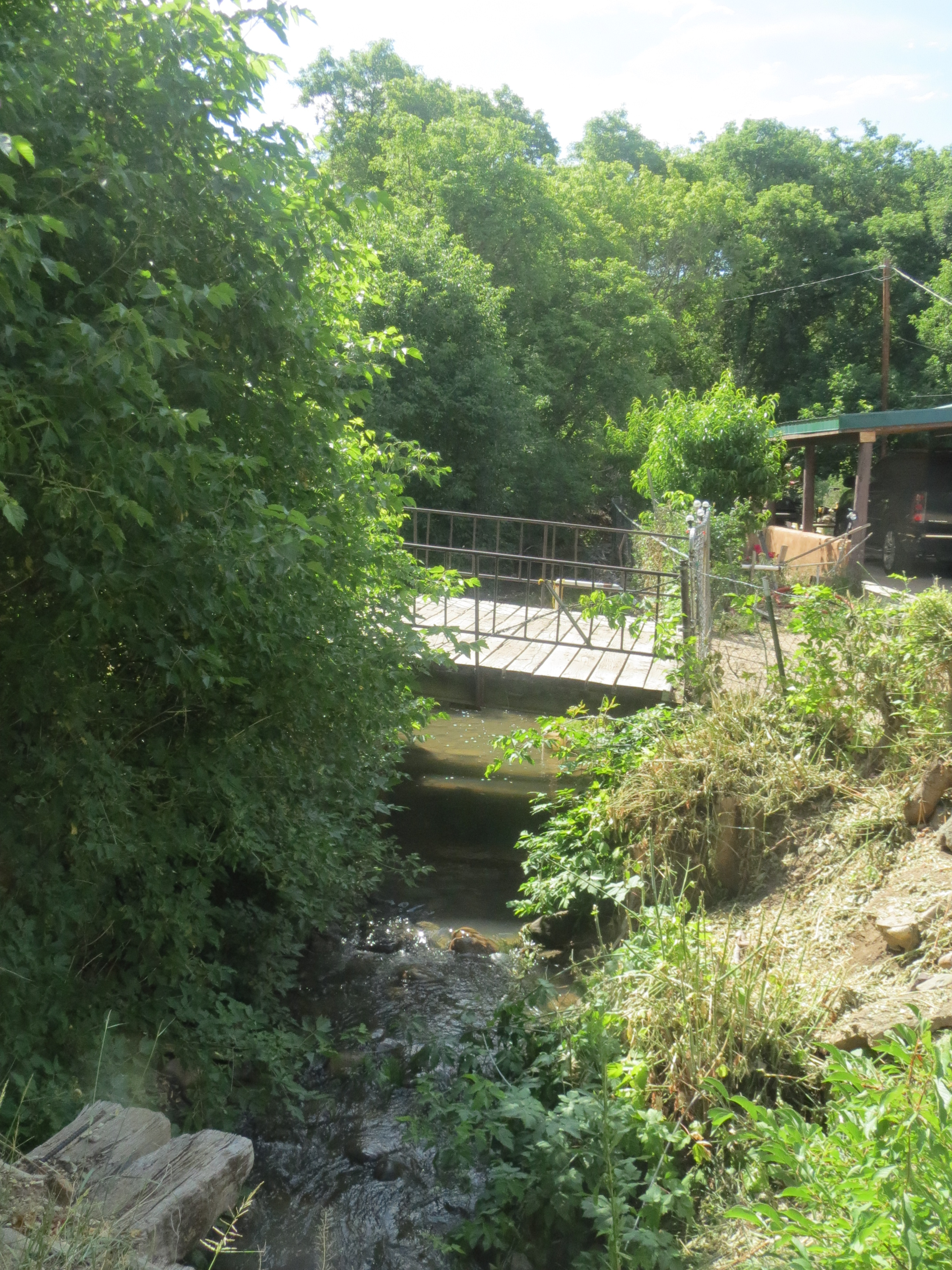
Rio Chiquito in Talpa

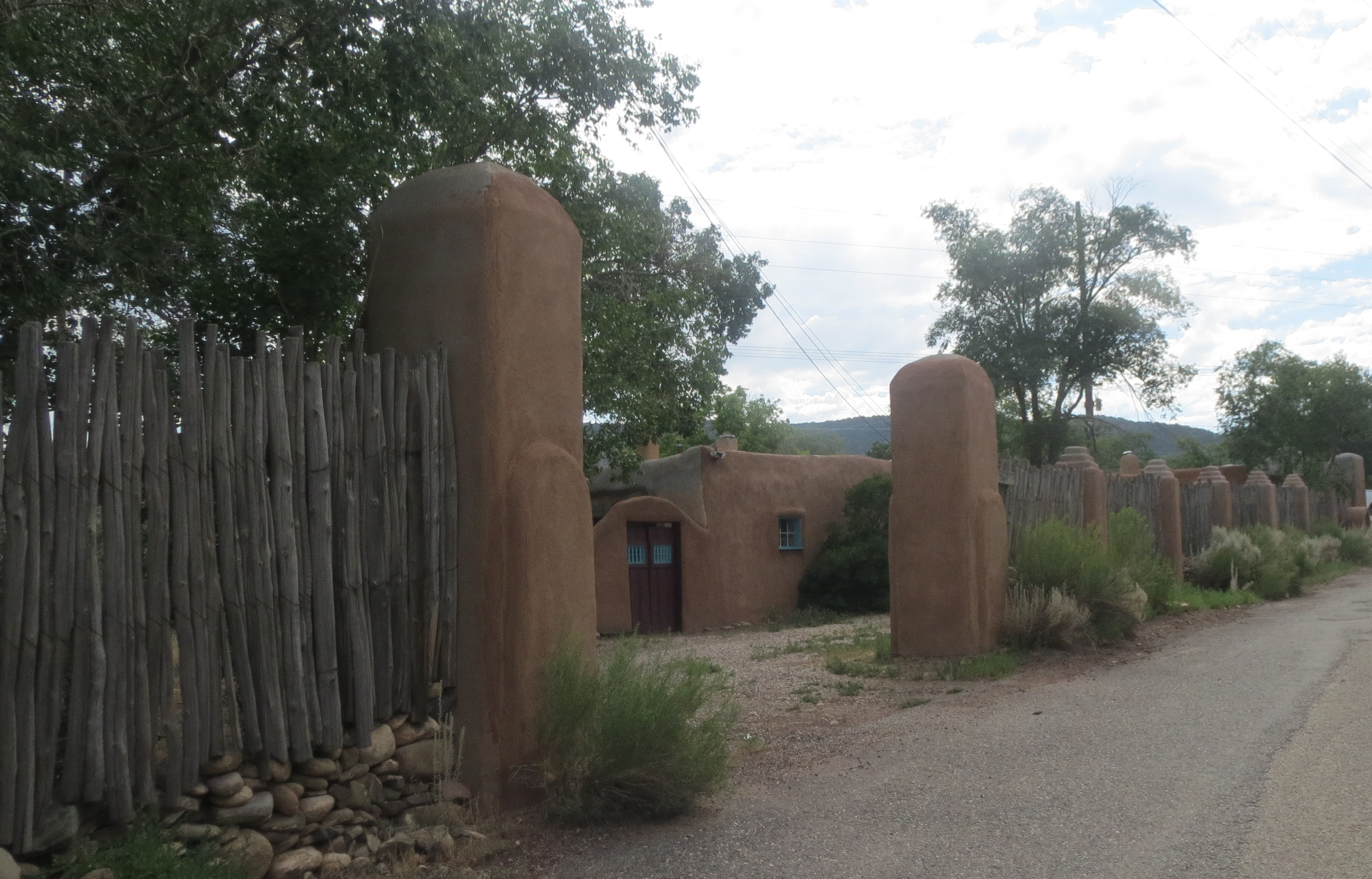
Talpa street

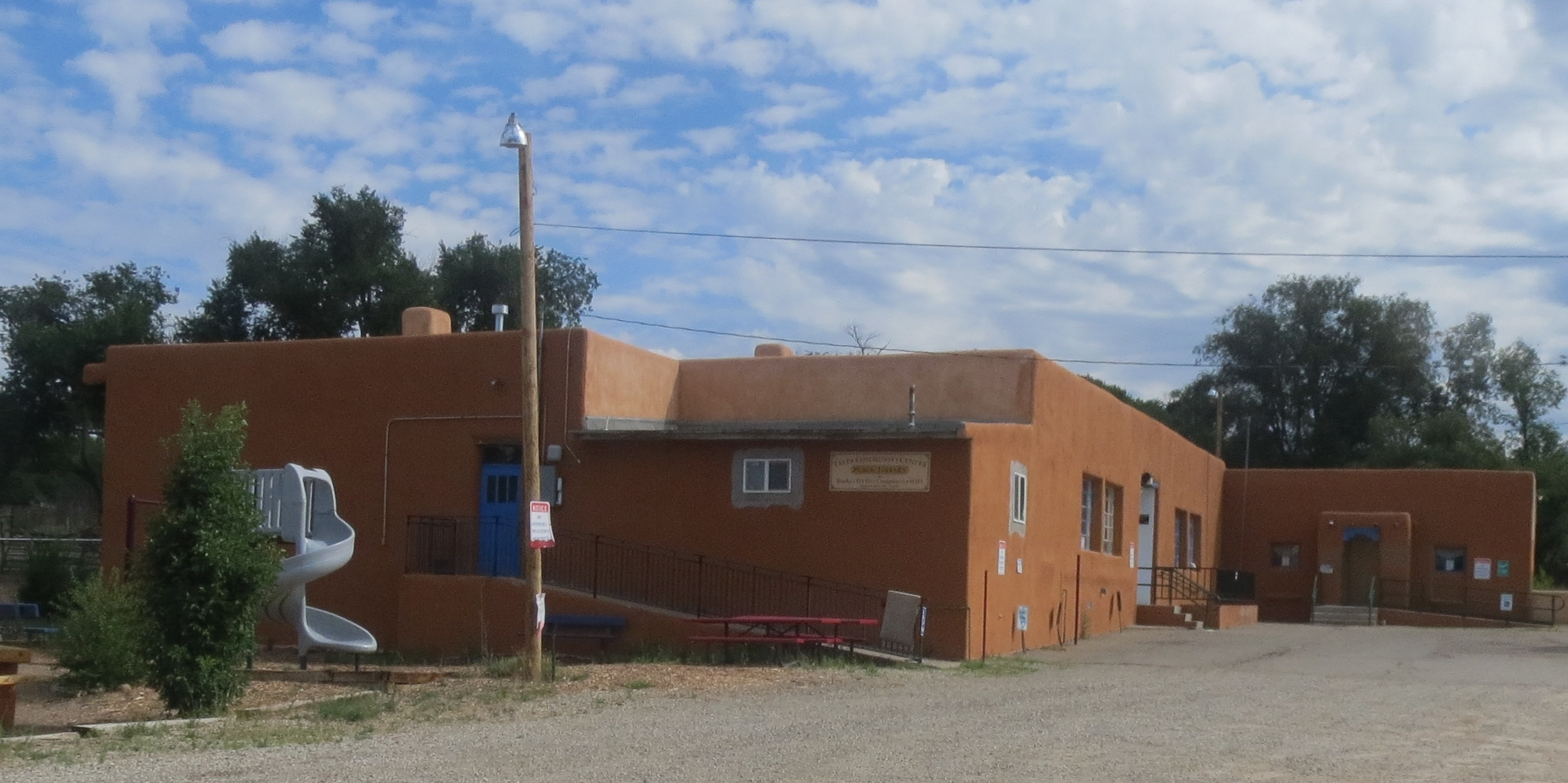
Talpa Community Center

== See also ==
- High Road to Taos
- Pot Creek Cultural Site, located just south of Talpa
