= Taos High School =

Coordinates: 36.3915°N 105.5768°W

Location
- 134 Cervantes Street; Taos, New Mexico 87571; United States

Information
- School type: Public, high school
- Founded: 1917
- School district: Taos Municipal Schools (11 Schools 3,248+)
- Superintendent: Valerie Trujillo
- NCES School ID: 350252000583
- Principal: Emy Martinez-DeHerrera
- Teaching staff: 49.60 (FTE)
- Enrollment: 763 (2023–2024)
- Student to teacher ratio: 15.38
- Campus: Suburban
- Colors: Orange & Black
- Athletics conference: NMAA - 2AAAA League
- Mascot: Tigers
- Newspaper: "Tigers' Roar"
- Yearbook: "Don Fernando"
- Website: www.taosschools.org/o/thsc

Taos High School, founded in 1917, is the public high school in Taos, New Mexico, United States. A part of the Taos Municipal Schools school district, is located outside of Taos Pueblo, at the base of the Sangre de Cristo Mountains.

The district, and therefore the high school, serves the communities of Taos, Arroyo Hondo, Arroyo Seco, Ranchos de Taos, San Cristobal, Talpa, Taos Pueblo, and almost all of Taos Ski Valley.

== History ==
The first high school in Taos County opened in the fall of 1917 with Jesse Howard as director. The site of the first THS was west of the present Enos Garcia Elementary School. At the time the building was the Presbyterian Church, which included a few rooms for the first classes under the new teacher. Principal Emma McKean soon took charge of the school and remained at its head until 1921.

The first graduating class of Taos High was the 1921 class with seven members. During that year a new high school was constructed and served for 20 years. It was during this era that THS began offering student activities and clubs such as orchestra, glee club, 4-H, Future Farmers of America and drama. Tiger athletics were also established, beginning with basketball and track in 1923 and football in 1937. The Don Fernando yearbook and the Tigers' Roar newspaper first appeared during the 1937-1938 school year. Principals who followed McKean were Albright, Palmer, Don C. Piper, Ernest Lyckman, Wesley Freeburg, Culbert, Fred Jones, Jacob Bernal, Paul Springer and Joseph W. Evans.

In 1942, a new high school and gymnasium were constructed on Don Fernando Street due to increased enrollment. The former high school building was the new home of Taos Junior High School. Principals who served at this campus were Bright E. Greiner who served until 1955, Orlando Ortiz who served until 1959 and Bill Parr who served until 1967. The building is still in operation and the home of Enos Garcia Elementary School.

The Class of 1968 was the first to graduate from the current campus on Cervantes Street. In the fall of 1967, the modern complex of cinder blocks, tile floors and recessed lighting opened its doors to an estimated 800 sophomores, juniors and seniors. The new building was able to offer educational opportunities which were not available at the old THS because of cramped conditions. Among the improvements mentioned were a cafeteria and library located within the building, a student lounge, departmental sections and a landscaped patio.

The 2017–18 school year marked the 100th centennial anniversary of Taos High School and the 50th golden anniversary of its current campus.

The Class of 2021 will be the centennial class.

In 2018 the Gates Family Foundation gave the school a $10,000 grant for culinary arts courses.

== Student activities and clubs ==
Activities offered by the school include:

- Band
- Botball
- Business Professionals of America
- Color Guard
- Governor STEM Challenge
- Drama
- Driven
- Earth Club
- Entrepreneurship Club
- Envirothon
- ESports
- Freshmen Senate
- Gay-Straight Alliance
- German Club
- Health Occupations Students of America
- Journalism, Tigers' Roar
- Junior Senate
- National Honor Society
- Mariachi El Tigre
- Poetry
- MECHA
- Science Bowl
- Science Fair
- Senior Senate
- Ski Club
- Snowboarding Club
- Sophomore Senate
- Speech & Debate
- Student Government
- Yearbook, Don Fernando

== Athletics ==
Taos High School competes in the NMAA District 2-AAAA along with Espanola Valley High School, Los Alamos High School, Moriarty High School and Pojoaque Valley High School in every sport.

=== Current teams ===
Taos High School participates in the following athletics:

==== Boys ====
- Baseball
- Basketball
- Cross Country
- Football
- Golf
- Hockey
- Soccer
- Swimming & Diving
- Tennis
- Track & Field
- Wrestling

==== Girls ====
- Basketball
- Cheer (Coed)
- Cross Country
- Golf
- Soccer
- Softball
- Swimming & Diving
- Tennis
- Track & Field
- Volleyball
