= Raven Explorer II =

American homebuilt autogyro

General information
- Type: Autogyro
- National origin: United States
- Manufacturer: Raven Rotorcraft
- Status: Production completed

History
- Variant: Raven Rotor-Plane

The Raven Explorer II is an American autogyro designed by Raven Rotorcraft of Boulder Colorado and later El Prado, New Mexico, introduced in the 1990s. No longer in production, when it was available the aircraft was supplied as a kit for amateur construction.

Introduced in the mid-1990s the Explorer II design is now out of production as the company is developing into the Raven Rotor-Plane for the light-sport aircraft category.

== Design and development ==
The aircraft was designed to comply with the US Experimental - Amateur-built aircraft rules. It features a single main rotor, a two-seats-in side-by-side configuration open cockpit without a windshield and conventional landing gear. The acceptable power range was 90 to 120 hp (67 to 89 kW) and the standard engine used is a three cylinder in-line, liquid-cooled, four-stroke, 90 hp (67 kW) Geo Metro automotive conversion powerplant in tractor configuration.

The aircraft fuselage is made from welded 4130 steel and bolted-together aluminum tubing. Its two-bladed rotor has a diameter of 27 ft (8.2 m). The aircraft's specifications include a typical empty weight of 365 lb (166 kg) and a gross weight of 890 lb (400 kg), giving a useful load of 525 lb (238 kg). With full fuel of 8 U.S. gallons (30 L; 6.7 imp gal) the payload for the pilot, passengers and baggage is 477 lb (216 kg).

The standard day, sea level, no wind, take off with a 90 hp (67 kW) engine is 400 ft (122 m) and the landing roll is 50 ft (15 m).

The manufacturer estimated the construction time from the supplied kit as 100 hours.

== Operational history ==
In April 2015 no examples were registered in the United States with the Federal Aviation Administration and it is not clear if any were produced at all.

== Specifications (Explorer II) ==
Data from Purdy

General characteristics

- Crew: one
- Capacity: one passenger
- Length: 15.80 ft (4.82 m)
- Empty weight: 365 lb (166 kg)
- Gross weight: 890 lb (404 kg)
- Fuel capacity: 8 U.S. gallons (30 L; 6.7 imp gal)
- Powerplant: 1 × Rotax 912ULS four cylinder, liquid and air-cooled, four stroke aircraft engine, 100 hp (75 kW)
- Main rotor diameter: 27 ft 0 in (8.23 m)
- Main rotor area: 572 sq ft (53.1 m^{2})
- Propellers: 2-bladed fixed pitch

Performance

- Maximum speed: 100 mph (160 km/h, 87 kn)
- Service ceiling: 12,000 ft (3,700 m)
- Rate of climb: 700 ft/min (3.6 m/s)
- Disk loading: 1.5 lb/sq ft (7.3 kg/m^{2})

== See also ==
- List of rotorcraft
