= Arroyo Seco, New Mexico =

Arroyo Seco
- Census-designated place
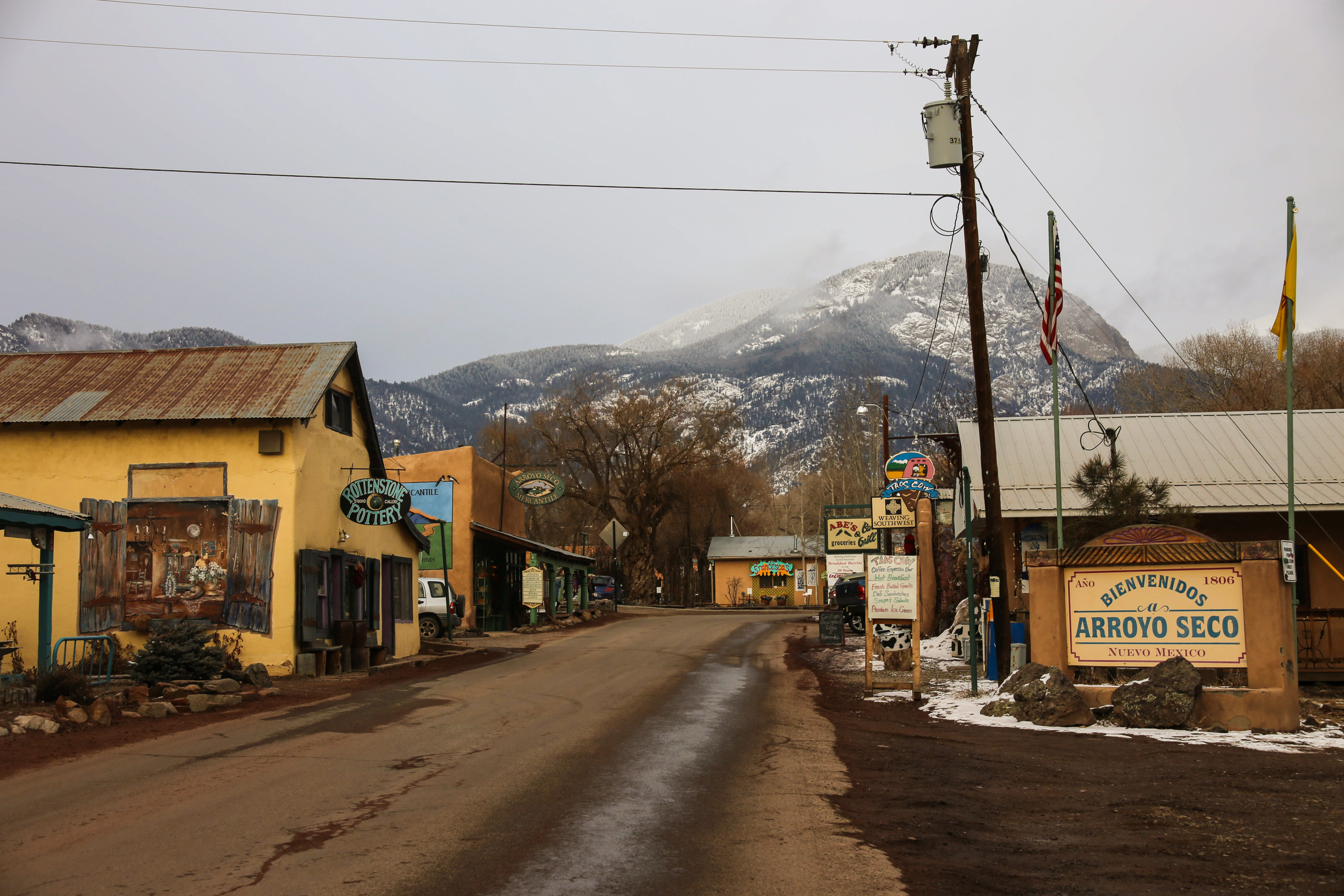
- Welcome sign in Arroyo Seco
- Etymology: Spanish for "Dry Creek"
- Location of Arroyo Seco in New Mexico and in the United States Arroyo Seco (the United States)
- Coordinates: 36°30′50″N 105°36′34″W
- Country: United States
- State: New Mexico
- County: Taos
- Settled: 1806

Government
  - Type: unincorporated community

Area
  - Total: 6.83 sq mi (17.68 km^{2})
  - Land: 6.83 sq mi (17.68 km^{2})
  - Water: 0 sq mi (0.00 km^{2})
- Elevation: 7,582 ft (2,311 m)

Population (2020)
  - Total: 1,979
  - Density: 289.9/sq mi (111.94/km^{2})
- Time zone: UTC−7 (Mountain (MST))
  - Summer (DST): UTC−6 (MDT)
- ZIP code: 87514
- Area code: 575
- FIPS code: 35-05150
- GNIS feature ID: 2629104

Arroyo Seco is a census-designated place in Taos County near Taos, New Mexico. As of the 2020 census, Arroyo Seco had a population of 1,979. Arroyo Seco's economy is based on tourism and services to residents of retirement and vacation homes.

Arroyo Seco has a post office, with the ZIP code 87514. Arroyo Seco's elevation is 7,634 feet.

== History ==
The settlement is the location of the El Pueblito site (Northern Tiwa: P’ôkutho), an abandoned pueblo of Taos people.

Arroyo Seco was settled in 1804, on a Spanish land grant made on October 7, 1745. The Church of the Most Holy Trinity was completed in 1834 and has recently been restored.

Overlooking Arroyo Seco stands Lucero Peak, a 10,780 feet (3,290 m) rock formation. Housed in the Peak is a cave that is sacred to the local Native American population of Taos Pueblo. The cave featured in D. H. Lawrence's short story "The Woman who Rode Away" after he visited it on horseback in May 1924 with Mabel Dodge Luhan "and perhaps [Lawrence's wife] Frieda, [Luhan's husband] Tony, and Clarence Thompson, a young lodger at the Luhans'."

== Demographics ==
Historical population
Census	Pop.	Note	%±
2010	1,785		—
2020	1,979		10.9%
U.S. Decennial Census

Racial Makeup
Race (NH = Non-Hispanic)	% 2020	% 2010	Pop. 2020	Pop. 2010
White Alone (NH)	50.8%	51.5%	1,005	920
Black Alone (NH)	0.2%	0.3%	3	5
American Indian Alone (NH)	1.1%	0.9%	21	16
Asian Alone (NH)	1%	0.3%	20	6
Pacific Islander Alone (NH)	0.1%	0%	1	0
Other Race Alone (NH)	1.2%	0%	24	0
Multiracial (NH)	3.4%	1.5%	68	26
Hispanic (Any race)	42.3%	45.5%	837	812

As of the 2020 Census, there were 1,979 people, 924 households, and 1,148 housing units. The median age of the CDP was 55.2, with men being 55.8 and women being 54. The most reported ancestries were Mexican (17.6%), English (13.2%), Spanish (including Spaniard and Spanish American) (11.2%), German (8.9%), Irish (8.8%), and Scottish (3.8%).

== Education ==
It is within Taos Municipal Schools, which operates Taos High School.

== Events ==
Arroyo Seco's annual Fourth of July parade is locally popular.

== In culture ==
The words "She wrote her name there on my windshield, Just to remind me where she was from' Tina Louise, Arroyo Seco, New Mexico, 1971" in the Commander Cody and the Lost Planet Airmen song "Tina Louise" from their 1976 album Tales from the Ozone. Arroyo Seco is also mentioned in the title of the Fleet Foxes song "I Am All That I Need / Arroyo Seco / Thumbprint Scar" from their 2017 album Crack-Up.

== Gallery ==
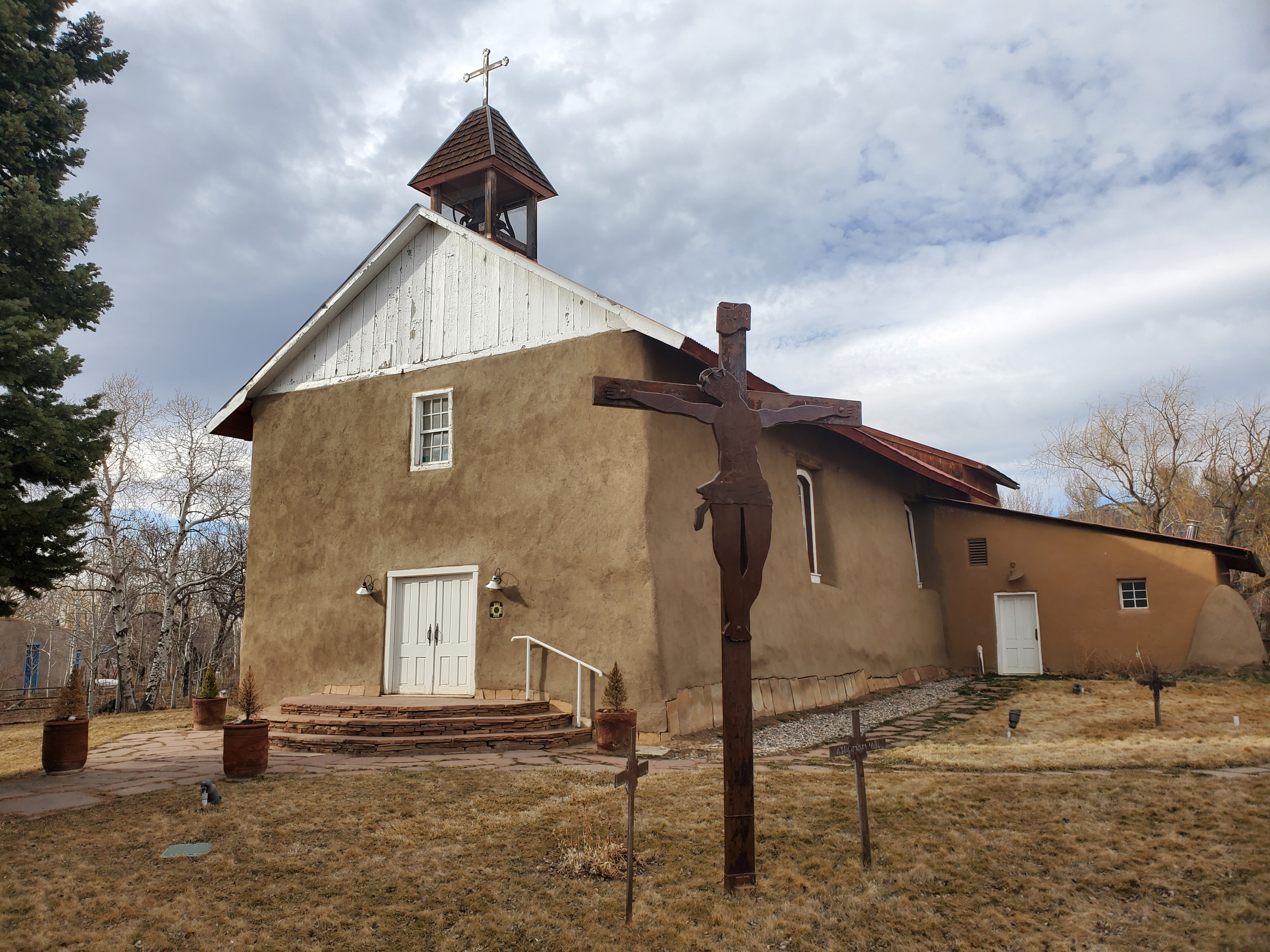
La Santisima Trinidad Catholic Church, March 2021

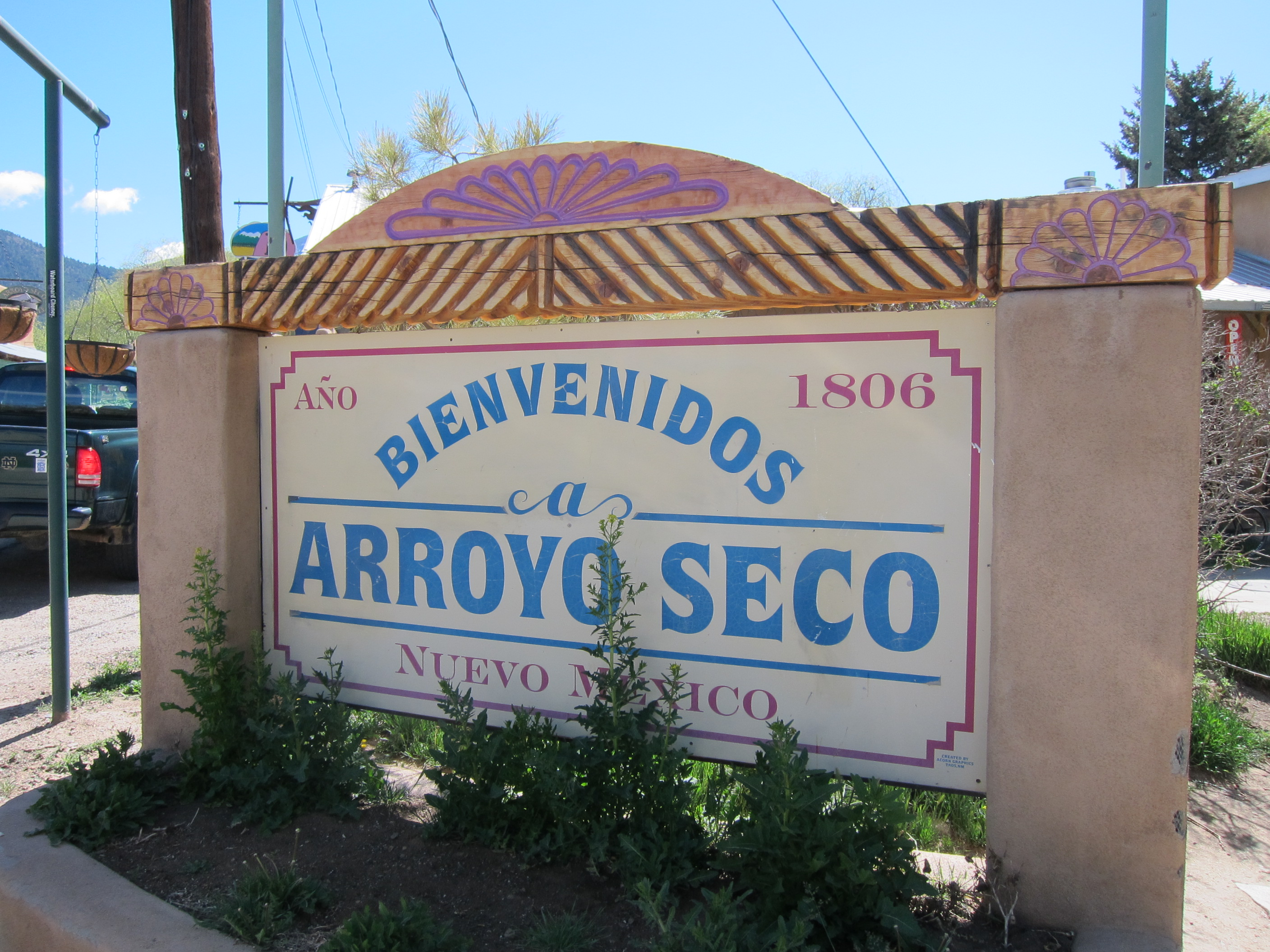
Welcome sign, 2011

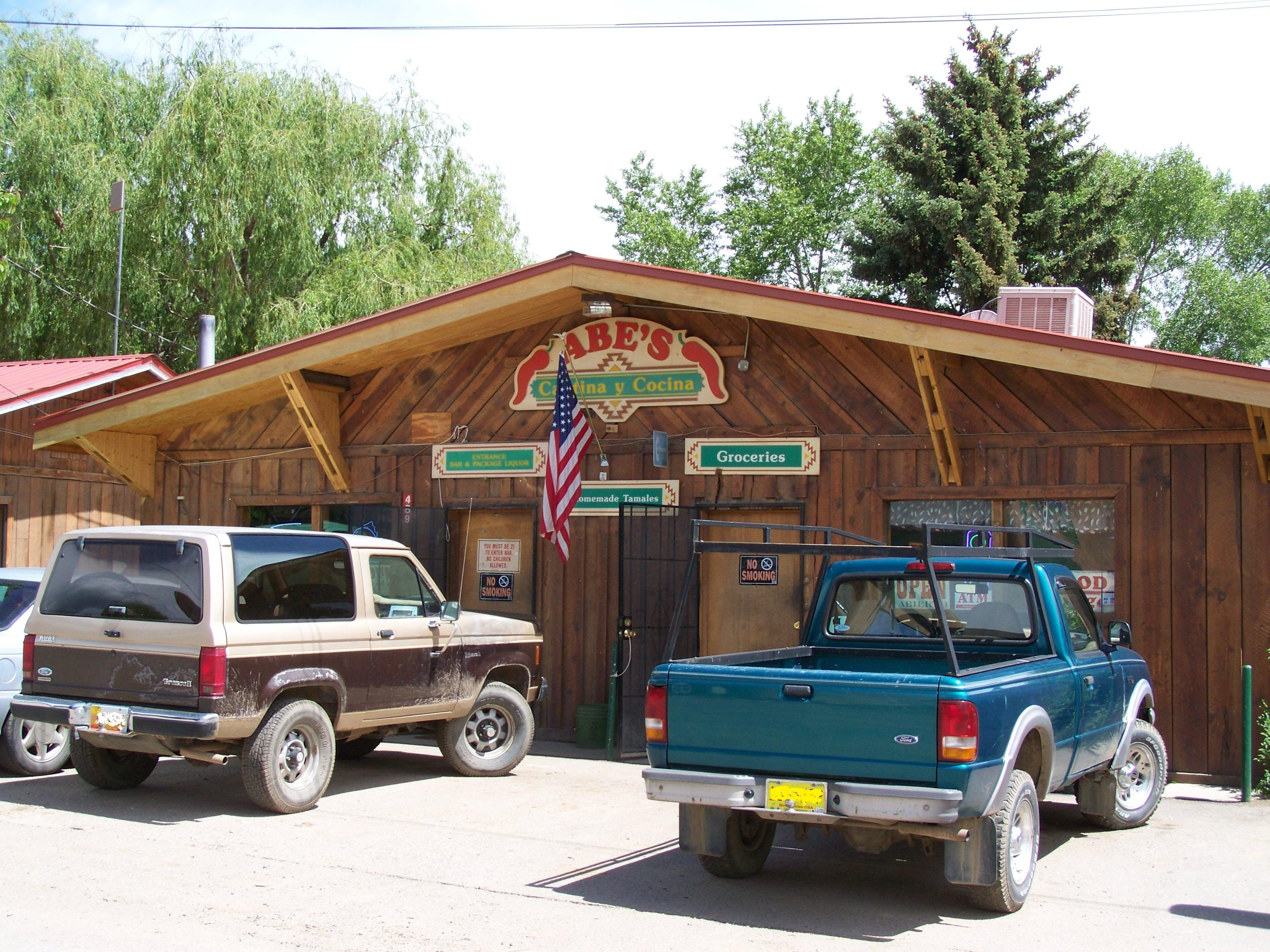
Abe's Cantina y Cocina, Arroyo Seco, c. 2009

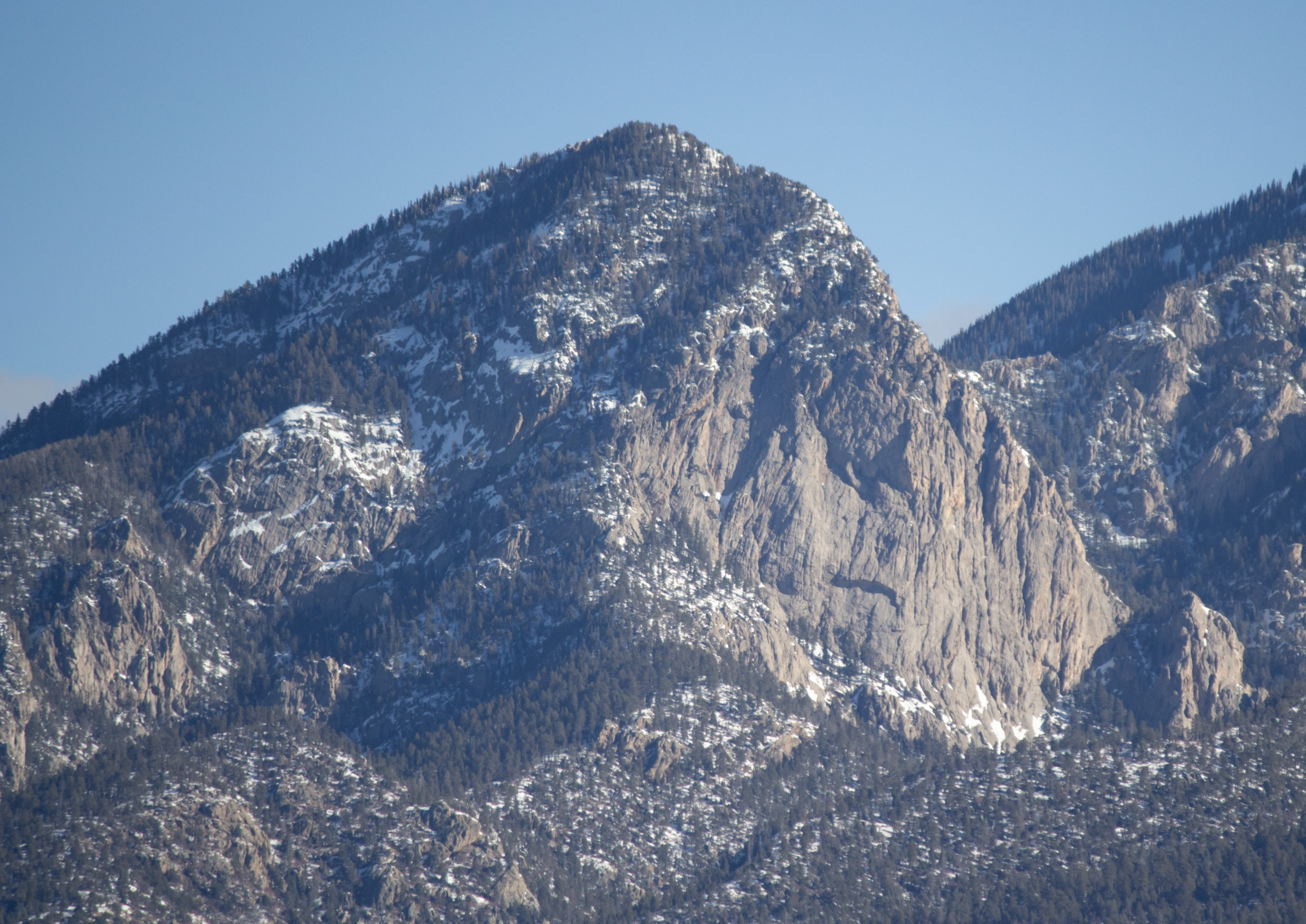
Lucero Peak, outside of Arroyo Seco

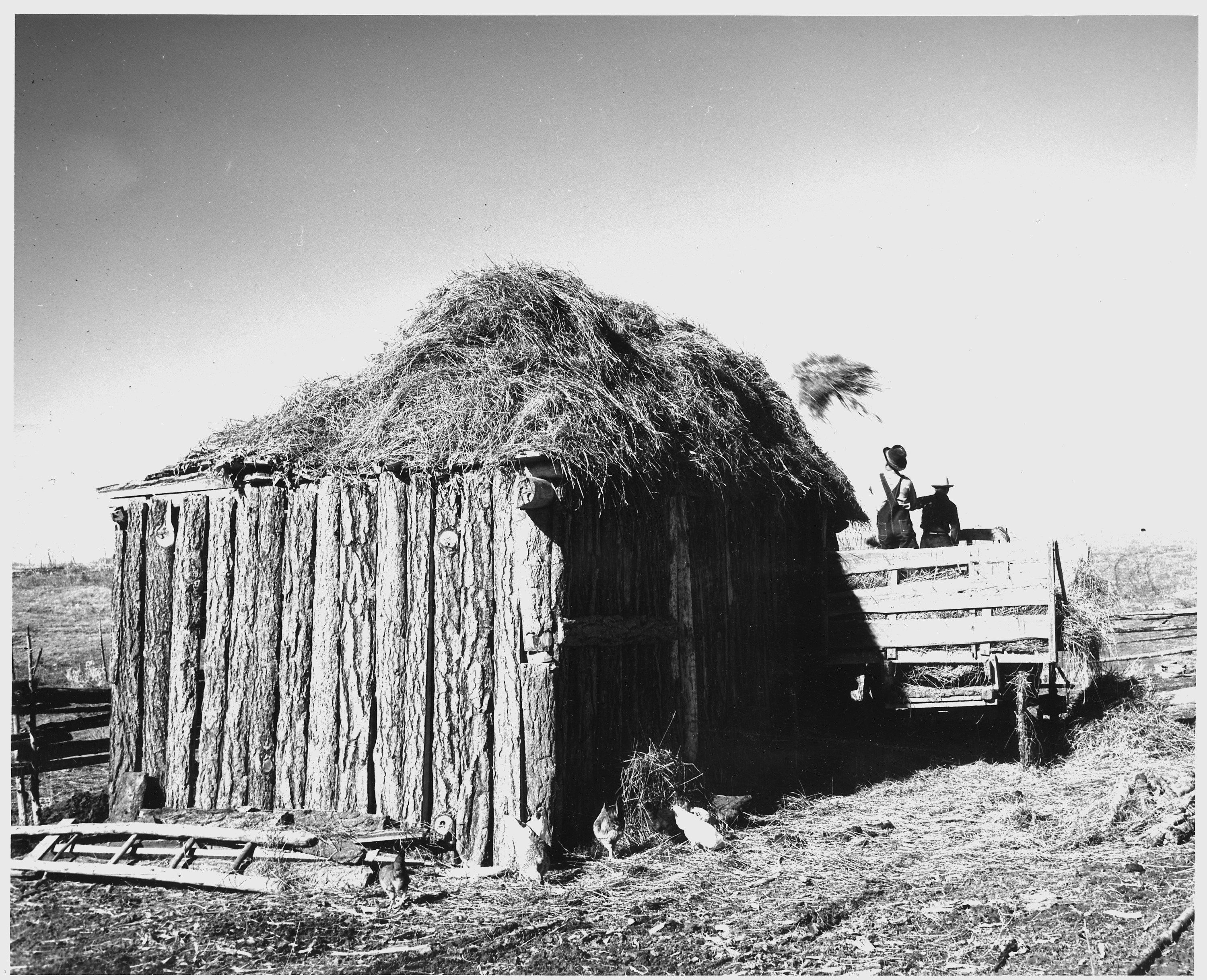
Pitching hay to roof of outbuilding, 1941

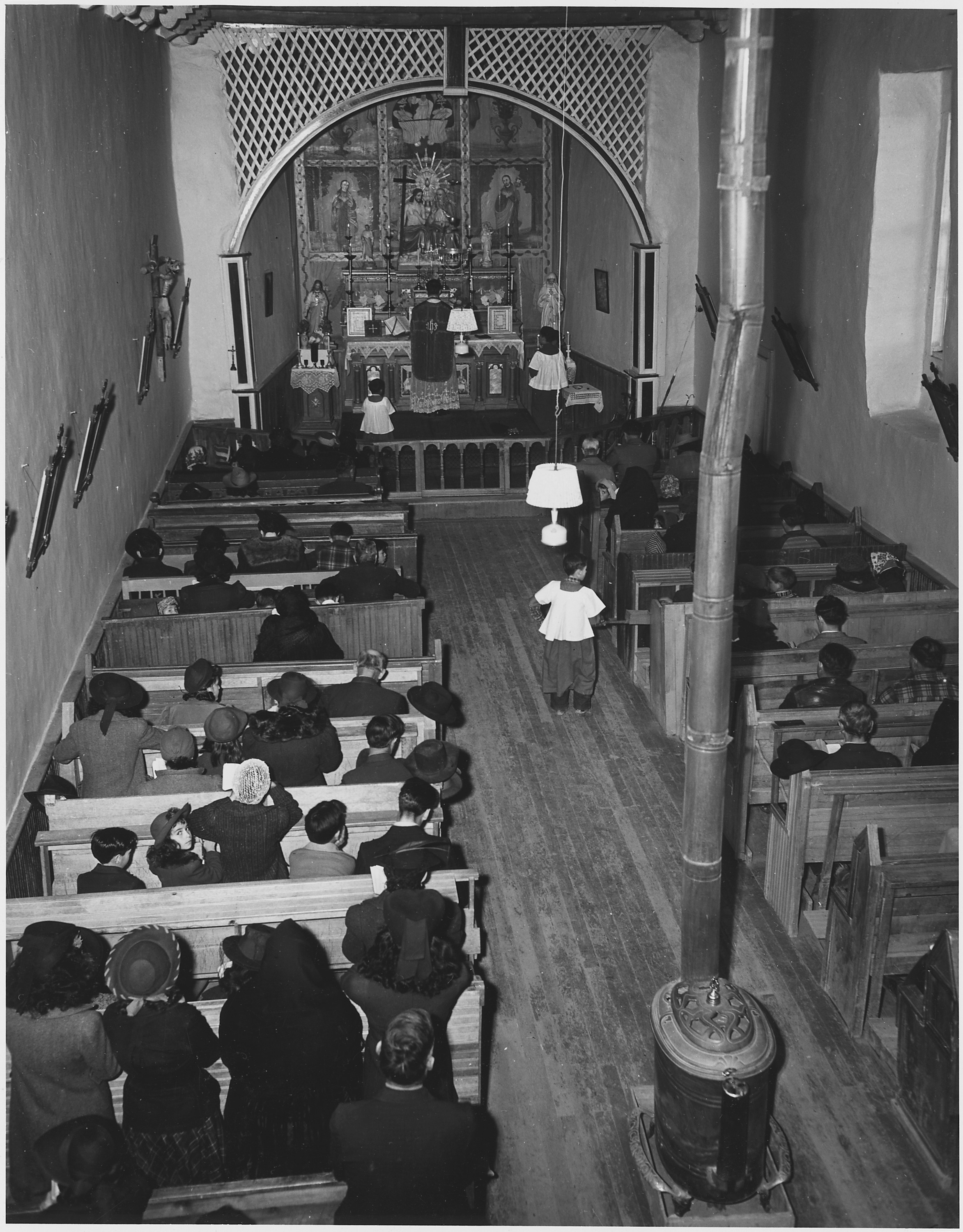
Mass at Arroyo Seco, 1941

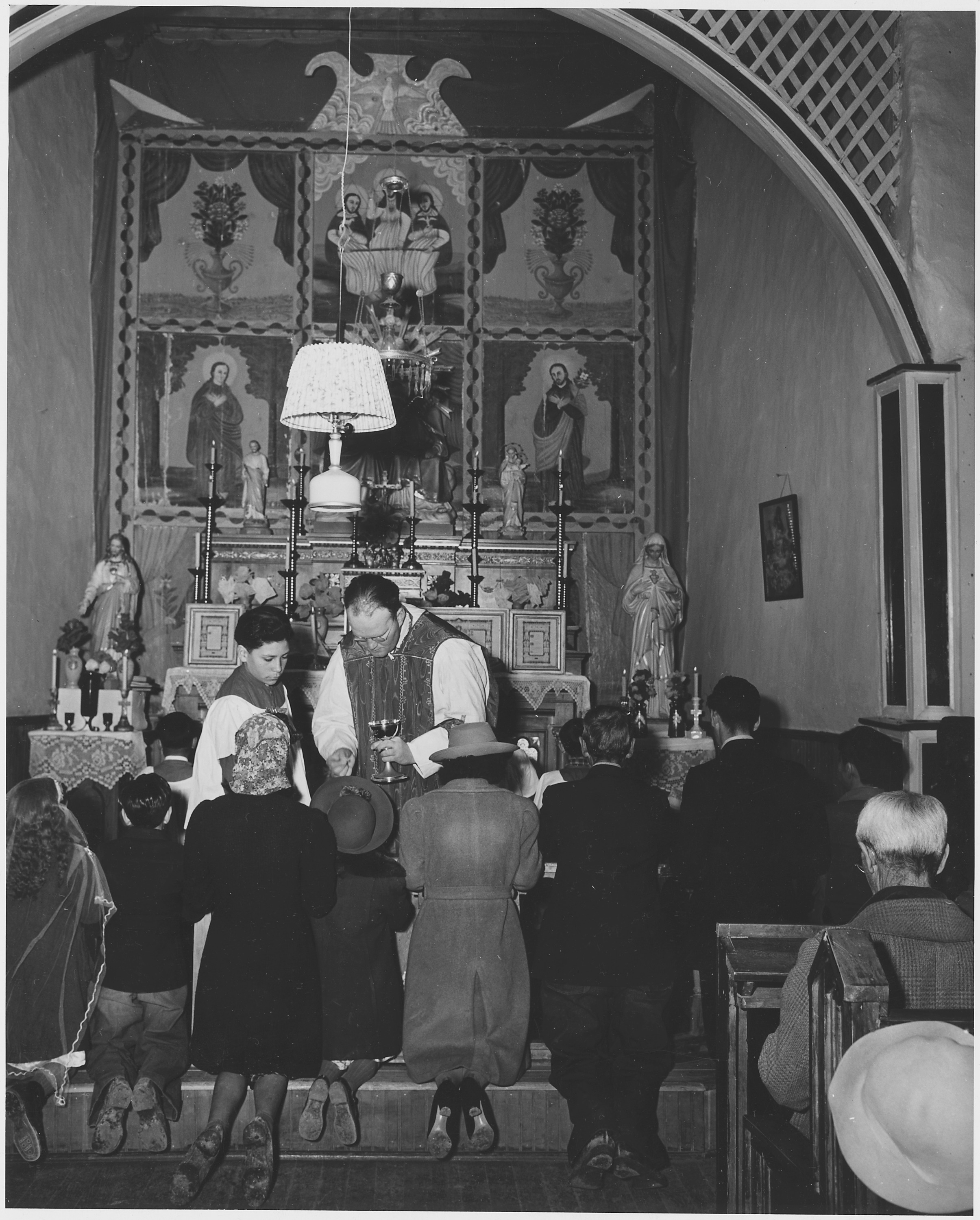
Mass at Arroyo Seco, 1941

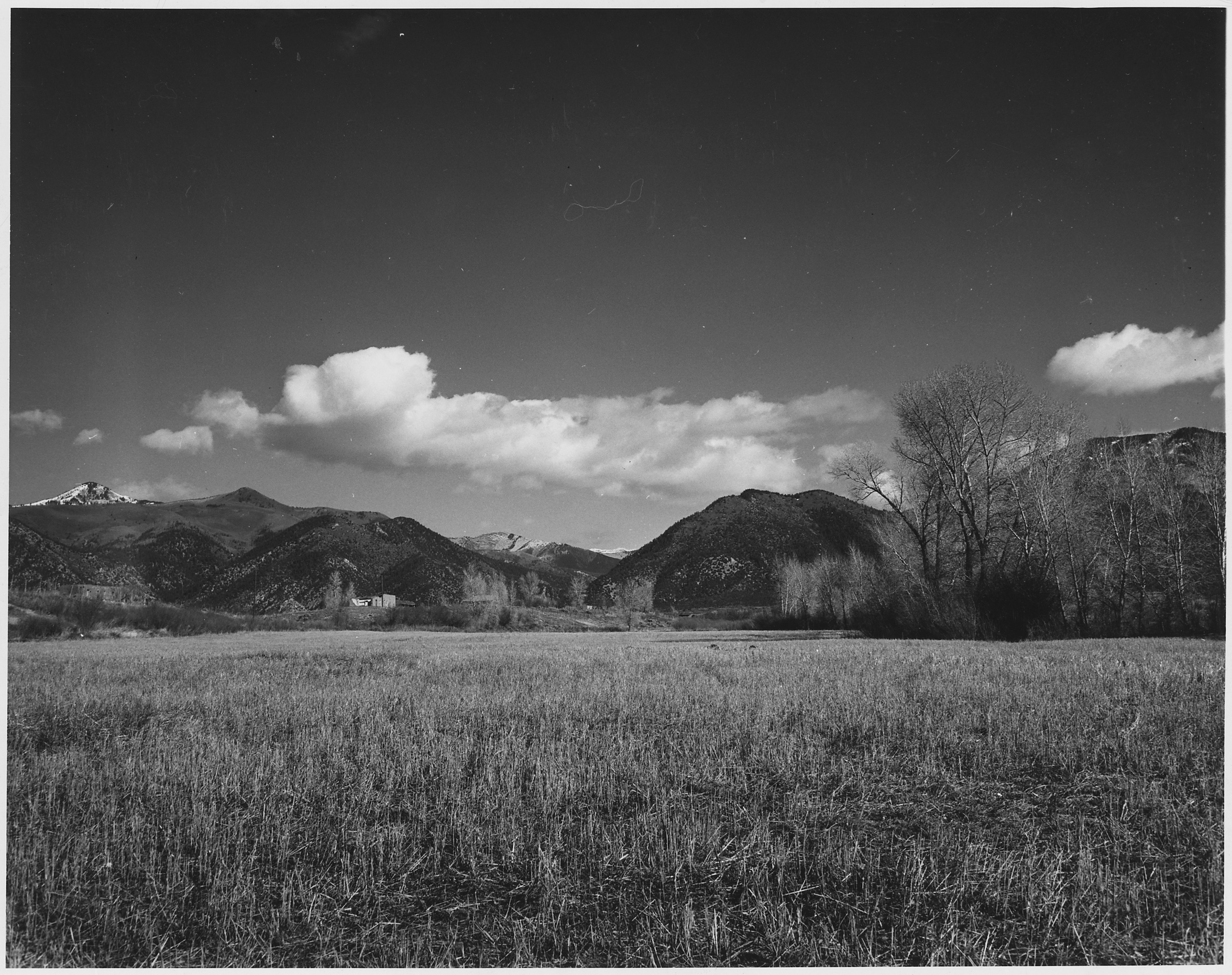
Small field at Arroyo Seco, 1941

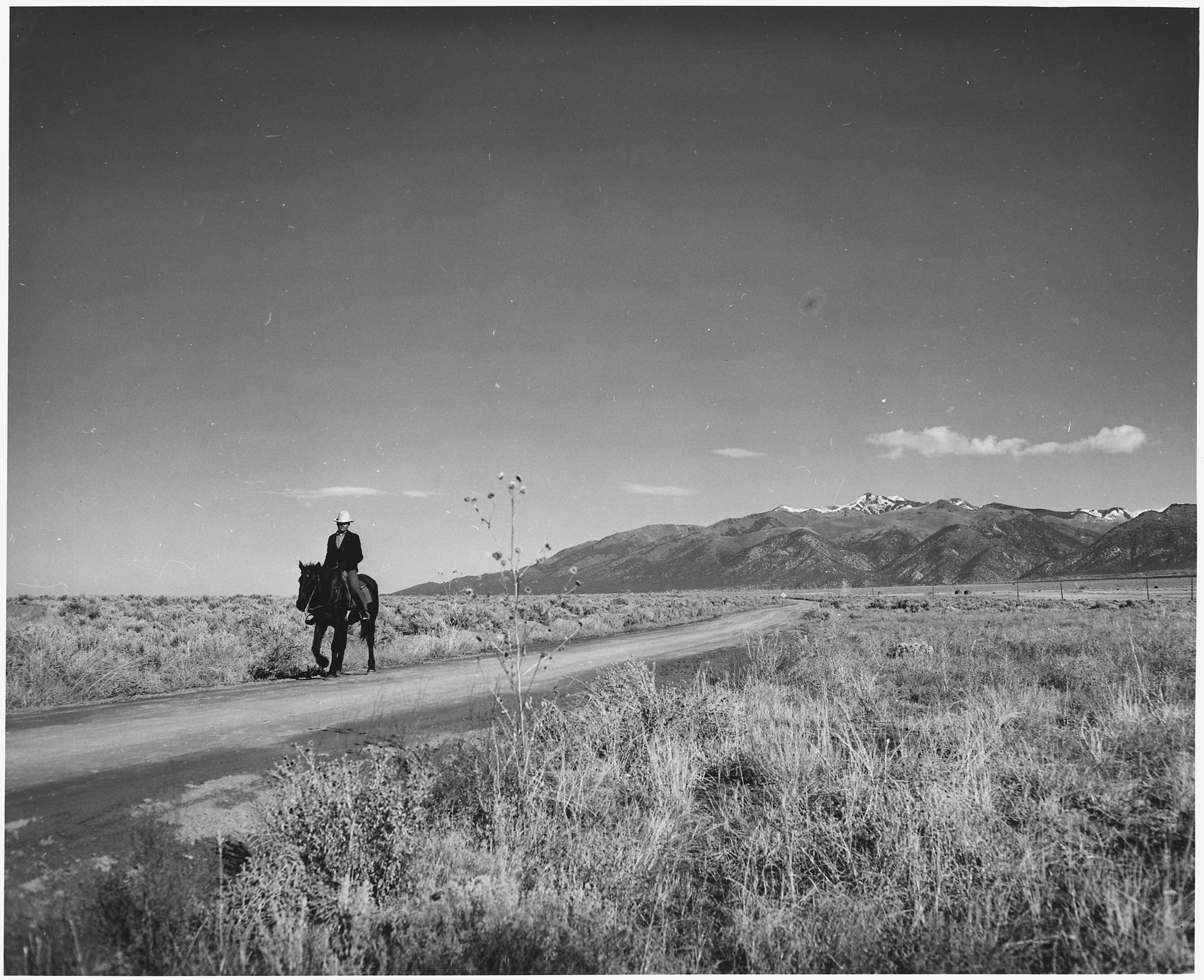
"The road to Arroyo Seco; in the distance, the Sange de Cristo Mountains, from whose melting snow comes most of the water of the area," December 1941

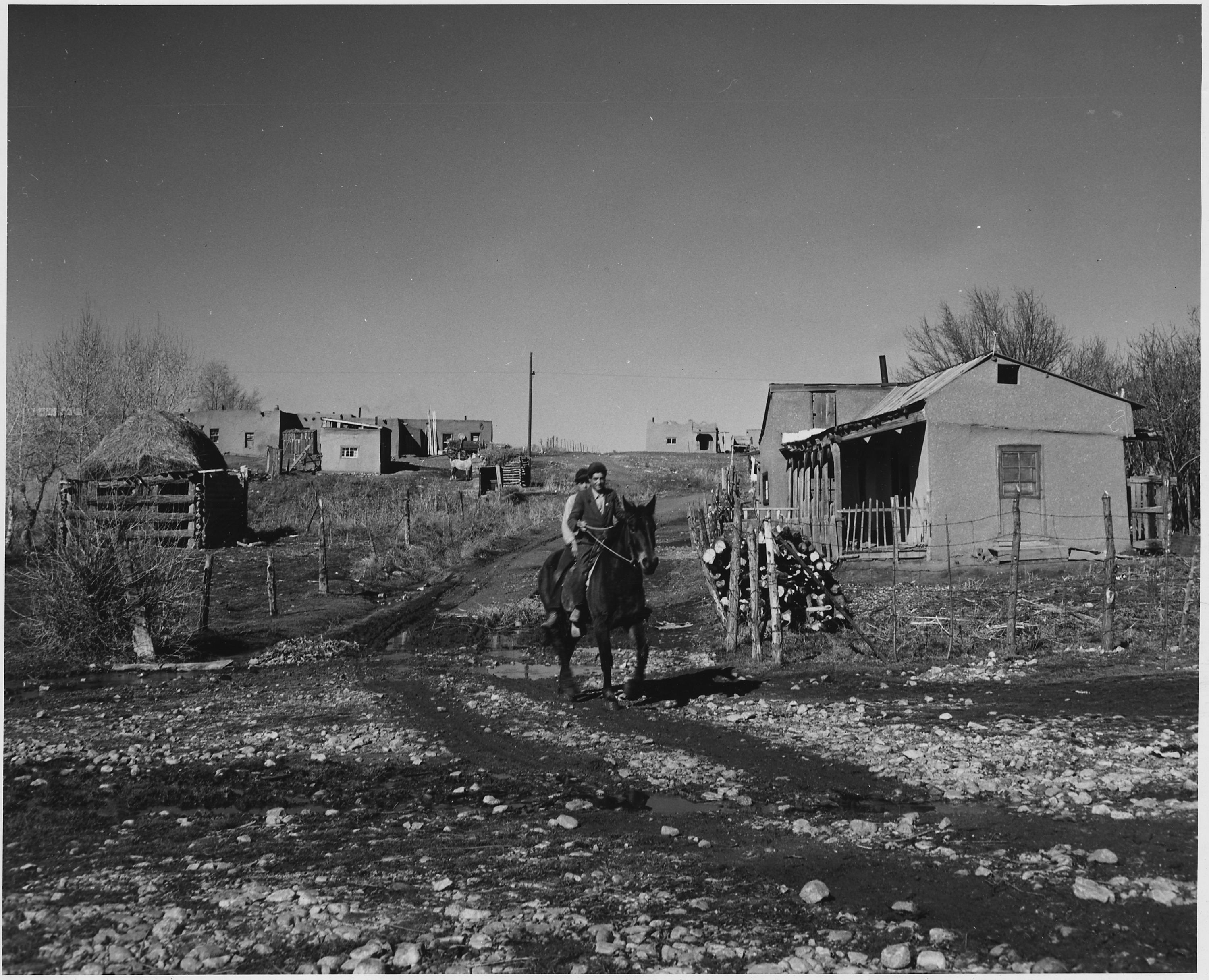
"Arroyo Seco. Note road, transportation by horse, typical structure of outbuildings," December 1941
