= El Prado, New Mexico =

Unincorporated community in New Mexico, US

Coordinates: 36°26′00″N 105°34′40″W

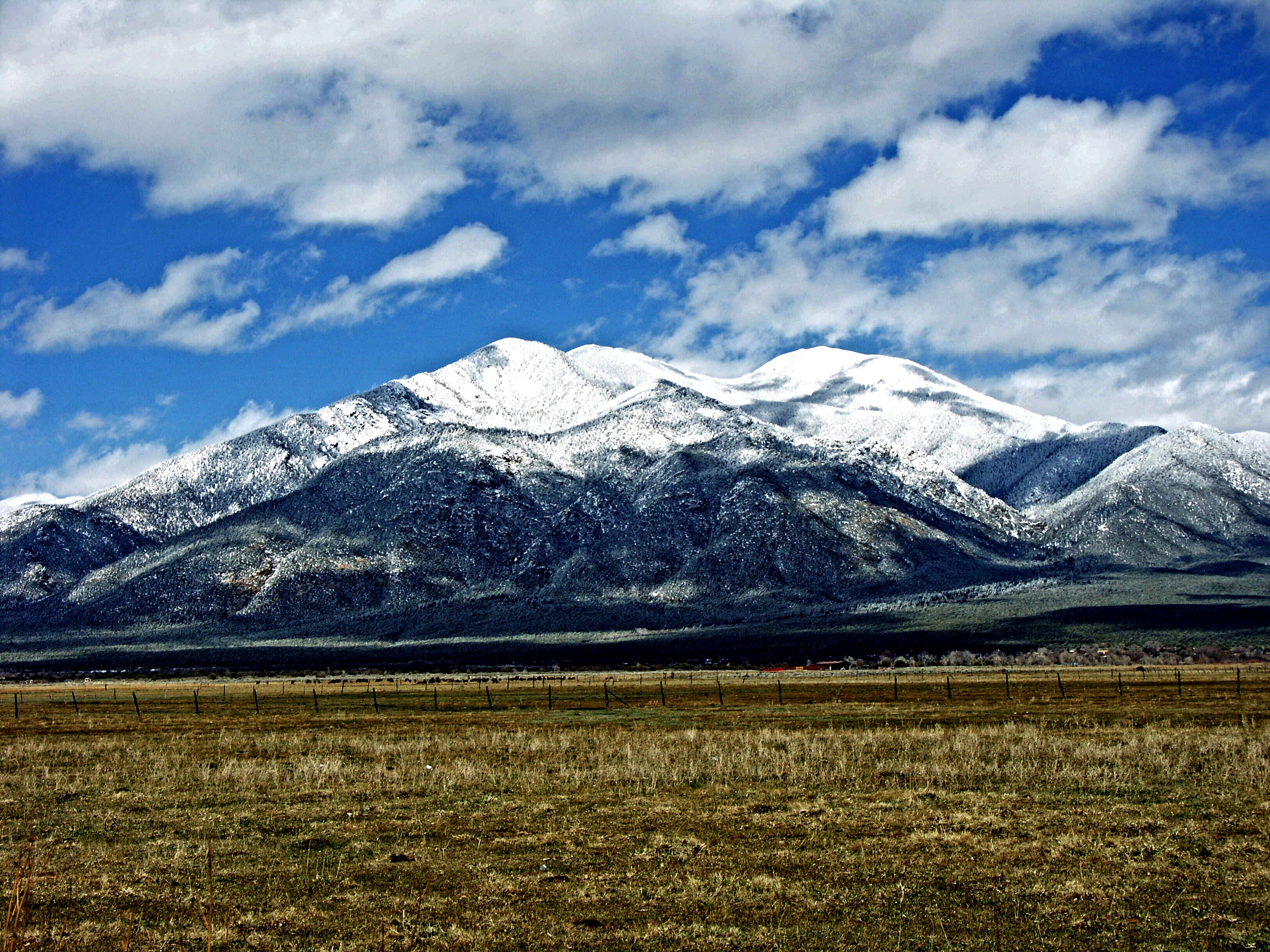
Taos Mountain from El Prado

El Prado is an unincorporated suburb and census designated place on the north side of Taos, in Taos County, New Mexico, United States. It is generally bounded on the south by the town of Taos, to the east by Taos Pueblo lands, to the north by Arroyo Seco and Arroyo Hondo, and to the west by the Rio Grande Gorge. The elevation is 7,123 feet. U.S. Route 64 and New Mexico State Roads 150 and 522 run through El Prado.

El Prado has a post office, assigned ZIP code 87529. The 87529 ZIP Code Tabulation Area had a population of 2,727 at the 2000 census. El Prado ZCTA had 1,622 housing units; a land area of 18.89 sq. miles; a water area of 0 sq. miles; and a population density of 144.40 people per square mile at the time of the 2000 census.

El Prado is within Taos County Commissioner Districts 1, 3 and 4. County commissioners designated it as a Traditional Historic Community in 2021.

El Prado is the home of the nonprofit Metta Theatre and Metta Young Artists, who train, produce and perform there.

== Attractions ==
- Millicent Rogers Museum
- KTAO studio offices and Solar Center Music Venue
- Rio Grande Gorge Bridge

== Notable person ==
- R. C. Gorman, artist

== Healthcare ==
- Holy Cross Hospital – one of the only acute care hospitals in the area. Established in 1936 through a donation from Mabel Dodge Luhan.
- Taos Urgent Care - Currently the only urgent care located in the area besides the hospital.
- Questa Health Clinic – Operated by Presbyterian Medical Services and focuses on primary care, dental, and behavioral health services. It is the successor to the United Presbyterian Church's Medical Mission work in the Southwest, which began in 1901.
- El Centro Family Health – a local sliding scale health clinic
- Shadow Mountain Recovery – a male-only residential substance abuse treatment center
- Vista Taos Renewal Center – CARF-accredited residential substance abuse treatment center that utilizes a person centered approach and works alongside a 12 Step model.
