= Walfre Donaldo Calderón-Calderón =

Guatemaltecan drug lord (born 1982)

- Born: September 12, 1982 (age 44); Guatemala
- Occupation: Drug Lord
- Organization: Cártel Chiapas y Guatemala (CCYG)
- Height: 1.xx
- Parent: father: Baldemar Calderón-Carrillo (“Don Valde”)
- Relatives: many
- Criminal charges: Drug trafficking, illegal possession of firearms, extortion, money laundering, kidnapping, criminal forfeiture
- Reward amount: $20 million
- Capture status: Fugitive
- Wanted by: (United States) DEA, DOS

Walfre Donaldo Calderón-Calderón („El Teniente Jr.“) is one of Guatemala’s most influential criminals and is responsible for widespread violence in society, including murders and corruption in the Central American country.

Calderon is leader of the Cártel Chiapas y Guatemala (CCYG). The CCYG operates in northwestern Guatemala and the Mexican state of Chiapas, and it works closely with Mexican Cartel de Jalisco Nueva Generación (CJNG).

== Live ==
=== Calderón-Calderón organization ===
Walfre Donaldo Calderón-Calderón was born on March 20, 1982, in Huehuetenango, Guatemala. His later aliases are "El Teniente Jr.," "Teniente," and "TNT." Calderón-Calderón comes from a criminal family dynasty in the northwestern department of Huehuetenango. His father, Baldemar Calderón-Carrillo (“Don Valde”) and built an influential smuggling network in the region, in which several brothers, cousins, and other relatives held leading roles.

By the end of the 2010s at the latest, the group was operating out of the border communities of La Mesilla and La Democracia. It organized the transport of large quantities of cocaine from South America, through Guatemala and Mexico, toward the United States.

On May 31, 2019, a federal court in the Southern District of California (San Diego) issued a sealed indictment against Calderón-Calderón, his father, and eleven other members of the network. He is accused of organizing the international smuggling of cocaine into the United States, as well as the transport of drugs via the high seas.

=== Sinaloa spin-off CCYG ===
In 2022, his father, “Don Valde,” founded the Cártel de Chiapas y Guatemala (CCYG) as a splinter group from the Mexican Sinaloa Cartel. The group expanded its sphere of influence across the border into the Mexican state of Chiapas, including the municipalities of Frontera Comalapa and Motozintla.

To gain the upper hand against rival Sinaloa Cartel and the Guatemalan cartel Los Huistas, the CCYG forged a strategic alliance with the Mexican Cartel de Jalisco Nueva Generación (CJNG).

Mexican security authorities hold the CCYG directly responsible for the murder of five officers from the State Preventive Police (Policía Estatal Preventiva) in the border town of Las Champas, Chiapas. During the ensuing pursuit and a two-hour firefight on June 8, 2025, Mexican special forces crossed the border into Guatemala, killing Calderón-Calderón’s father, cartel founder Baldemar Calderón-Carrillo (“Don Balde”) as well as three of his bodyguards. Walfre Donaldo Calderón-Calderón subsequently assumed leadership of the organization.

According to the U.S. State Department, "El Teniente Jr.," as a co-leader of the CCYG, now directs not only drug trafficking but also extortion, arms smuggling, human trafficking, and contract killings. Since breaking away from the Sinaloa Cartel in 2022 and forming an alliance with CJNG, the CCYG under the leadership of "El Teniente Jr." has been waging a bloody territorial war in border communities such as Frontera Comalapa, Motozintla, and La Mesilla. This conflict has resulted in numerous killings of rival cartel members including fighters from the Sinaloa Cartel and the Guatemalan clan Los Huistas as well as acts of violence against the civilian population.
