= Los Huistas =

Los Huistas Cartel
- Huistas DTO
- Founded: in the 1990s and 2000s
- Founder: Eugenio Darío Molina-López („Don Darío") and Aler Baldomero Samayoa Recinos („Chicharra")
- Founding location: San Antonio Huista and Santa Ana Huista
- Years active: 2005–present
- Territory: Huehuetenango, Guatemala
- Membership: 150-200; ca 1000 „Sicarios" and „Halcones"
- Leader: not known
- Criminal activities: Drug trafficking, arms trafficking, human trafficking, torture, smuggling, money laundering, heroin producing, Meth producing etc.
- Rivals: CCYG

Los Huistas are one of the most powerful and influential drug cartels in Guatemala. Since the late 1990s, the group has controlled strategically important smuggling corridors in the northwest of the country, along the border with Mexico.

Following the killing and arrest of key leaders between 2024 and 2026, operational activities in the border municipalities of San Antonio Huista and Santa Ana Huista continue. They are being carried on by the "second tier" of the families involved.

== Activities ==
The cartel controls the mountainous border region, stretching from Huehuetenango across into the Mexican state of Chiapas. In its strongholds, it exercises a form of parallel governance, often dealing with petty crime with extreme severity in order to maintain the calm necessary for its own illicit operations.

The group serves as a key link for cocaine shipments from South America that are smuggled into the United States via Guatemala and Mexico. To do this, they use vehicle convoys equipped with secret compartments, as well as makeshift airstrips on rural roads in the northern part of Huehuetenango.

Unlike other smuggling cartels, Huistas has also ventured into drug production. In the mountainous regions, the cartel controls opium poppy fields used for the manufacture of heroin. Furthermore, they import chemical precursors from China to produce methamphetamine in their own laboratories.

== Backing structure ==
The organization is also deeply enmeshed in the local and national political structures of Guatemala. It engages in widespread corruption. Illegal proceeds are laundered through shell companies and legitimate businesses, such as coffee plantations.

== History ==
The organization Los Huistas emerged in the late 1990s, developing out of local smuggling gangs. The organization is named after the two municipalities of San Antonio Huista and Santa Ana Huista, located in the Guatemalan department of Huehuetenango.

Initially, they worked on behalf of Mexican cartels, but over time they built up their own networks and, from around 2010, became a largely autonomous and powerful cartel.

By collecting tolls for the transit of drugs, Los Huistas came into conflict with other local gangs. These gangs subsequently joined forces with elements of the CJNG to form the rival "Chiapas and Guatemala Cartel" in an effort to break the supremacy of Los Huistas.

Between 2024 and 2025, tensions escalated significantly when Los Huistas began again levying "taxes" on drug shipments passing through the department of Huehuetenango. In response, the CCYG attempted to forcibly break the Huistas' dominance in strategic border locations such as Frontera Comalapa, Mexico and Huehuetenango, Guatemala.

Fighting involving heavy weapons, as well as abductions and forced recruitment, forced thousands of ordinary people in Chiapas to leave their villages. Hundreds of Mexican citizens fled across the border into Guatemala to escape the violence.

In March 2025, the long-time leader Aler Baldomero Samayoa Recinos ("Chicharra") was captured in Mexico and subsequently extradited to the United States. In April 2026, the second-in-command, Eugenio Darío Molina-López ("Don Darío") for whom the U.S. had offered a $10 million bounty was arrested in San Diego.

While the CCYG and Los Huistas fought bitterly against each other for years, the front lines shifted toward the end of 2025. According to Guatemalan authorities, Los Huistas, the CCYG, and the CJNG entered into a temporary, pragmatic alliance to jointly fend off attacks by the "Los Chapitos" faction of the Sinaloa Cartel in Huehuetenango and San Marcos.

Despite the arrests of its leaders, the cartel's structure remained largely active. In November 2026, the U.S. government officially designated Los Huistas—along with other Guatemalan gangs—as a "foreign terrorist organization" (FTO).
