= Central American Highway 1 =

Regional highway in Central America

- Pan-American Highway

Route information
- Length: 2,461 km (1,529 mi)

Major junctions
- North end: La Mesilla, Guatemala
- South end: Panama City, Panama

Location
- Countries: Guatemala, El Salvador, Honduras, Nicaragua, Costa Rica, Panama

Highway system

The Central American Highway 1 (CA-1), also known as the Pan-American Highway, is a major road in Central America that forms part of the extensive Pan-American Highway system, connecting North America with South America. This route is vital for regional integration, traversing the countries of Guatemala, El Salvador, Honduras, Nicaragua, Costa Rica, and Panama, playing a crucial role in commerce, tourism, and the movement of people and goods.

== Route description ==
=== Guatemala ===
In Guatemala, CA-1 begins at the border crossing of La Mesilla, in the department of Huehuetenango, and runs west to east through key cities such as Huehuetenango, Chimaltenango, and the capital, Guatemala City. It continues eastward through Cuilapa and Jutiapa, ending at the border crossing of San Cristóbal Frontera with El Salvador. This segment is fundamental for national and international connectivity, facilitating the transport of goods and people between Mexico, Guatemala, and El Salvador.

=== El Salvador ===
In El Salvador, CA-1 enters through the border crossing of Las Chinamas, in the department of Ahuachapán, and traverses the country from west to east. It passes through important cities such as Santa Ana, San Salvador, and San Miguel, before reaching the border crossing of El Amatillo in La Unión, which connects with Honduras. This highway is vital for internal commerce and mobility and is part of the Pacific Corridor promoted by the Central American Integration System (SICA).

=== Honduras ===
In Honduras, CA-1 covers a short but strategic segment in the southern part of the country, connecting the border crossings of El Amatillo and El Guasaule. It passes through the cities of Nacaome and San Lorenzo, facilitating regional transit between El Salvador and Nicaragua. This segment is essential for commerce and Central American integration.

=== Nicaragua ===
In Nicaragua, CA-1, also known as NIC-1, is one of the country's main roadways. It starts at the border crossing of El Guasaule, in the department of Chinandega, and runs north to south through important cities such as León, the capital Managua, Masaya, and Rivas, until reaching the border crossing of Peñas Blancas with Costa Rica. This highway is fundamental for commerce, tourism, and transportation within the country.

=== Costa Rica ===
In Costa Rica, CA-1 is known as the Carretera Interamericana Norte (Inter-American Highway North). It enters from Peñas Blancas, at the border with Nicaragua, and traverses the country southward through cities such as La Cruz, Liberia, Cañas, San Ramón, Alajuela, and the capital, San José. It ends in Barranca, Puntarenas where it connects with the Carretera Interamericana Sur (CA-2). This segment is vital for transit between Central America and Panama, as well as for access to Costa Rica's Greater Metropolitan Area.

=== Panama ===
In Panama, CA-1 continues as the Carretera Panamericana (Pan-American Highway). It enters through the border crossing of Paso Canoas, in the province of Chiriquí, and heads eastward, passing through David, Santiago, Penonomé, and La Chorrera, until reaching Panama City, the national capital. This road is the country's main arterial route and connects with the Bridge of the Americas, which spans the Panama Canal. In Panama, the highway officially ceases to use the "CA" designation but remains an integral part of the Pan-American corridor.

== Regional significance ==
CA-1 serves as a key logistical axis in southern Guatemala and El Salvador. Its proximity to the Pacific coast facilitates the movement of goods and people between agricultural regions, tourist centers, seaports, and border crossings. Additionally, it complements the route of CA-1 by serving as an alternative coastal road in the isthmus's road integration.

== See also ==
- Pan-American Highway
- Peñas Blancas
- Paso Canoas
- Bridge of the Americas
