= Las Trampas Land Grant =

Land Grant in New Mexico, United States

Coordinates: 36.1311359°N 105.7589053°W

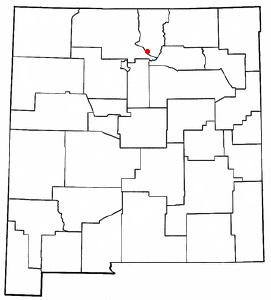
Location of Las Trampas Land Grant in New Mexico.

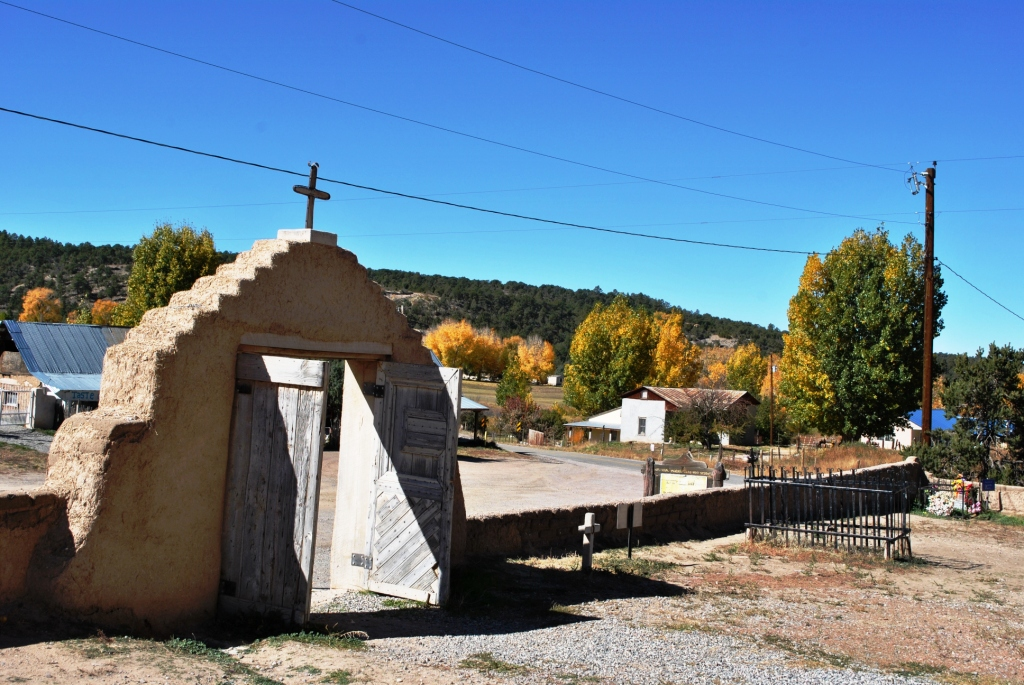
The village of Las Trampas is designated as a Historic district.

The Las Trampas Land Grant was awarded in 1751 by the colonial government of Spain to twelve Hispano families. The community of Las Trampas, New Mexico was founded the same year. The grant consisted of 28,132 acres (11,385 ha) of land on the western slopes of the Sangre de Cristo Mountains. The settlers served as a buffer on the frontiers of New Mexico to fend off Comanche raids. By the mid 19th century the population of the grant area had grown to about 1,500 in nine different farming and ranching settlements.

The farming land in the grant was owned by individual settlers and their descendants and could be bought and sold, but most of the land in the grant area was held in common and used for grazing and timber. After the U.S. conquest of New Mexico in 1846, Anglo-American and Hispano land speculators and attorneys used the U.S. legal system to get ownership of the common land. In 1903, the common lands in their entirety were sold to private owners with the settlers on the grant receiving only a pittance of the proceeds. Following legal struggles, the former common lands became part of the Carson National Forest in 1926. Controversies regarding the uses of the land by the descendants of the original settlers continue into the 21st century.

Although not one of the largest land grants, the legal and political history of the Las Trampas Land Grant is illustrative of land grant issues in New Mexico and southern Colorado.

== Background ==
From 1692 to 1846, the Spanish and Mexican governments awarded about 300 land grants to individuals, communities, and Pueblo villages in New Mexico and Colorado. After its conquest of New Mexico in the Mexican-American War, the U.S. and New Mexican governments adjudicated and "confirmed" (recognized the validity of) 154 of the grants in a long, slow, and corrupt legal process. The size of the confirmed land grants ranged in size from 200 acres (81 ha) for Cañada Ancha (now a suburb of Santa Fe) to 1,714,765 acres (6,939.41 km^{2}) for the Maxwell Land Grant on the eastern slope of the Sangre de Cristo Mountains extending northward into Colorado. As a consequence of the adjudication, the original grantees and their descendants, mostly poor Hispano farmers and ranchers, lost about 98 percent of their land to Anglos and Hispano land speculators and attorneys, especially to the members of the influential Santa Fe Ring. Much of the land ended up in publicly owned national forests. As of 2015, about 35 of the community grants in New Mexico continued to function, had boards of trustees, and owned in common about 200,000 acres (810 km^{2}) of land.

== The Las Trampas grant ==
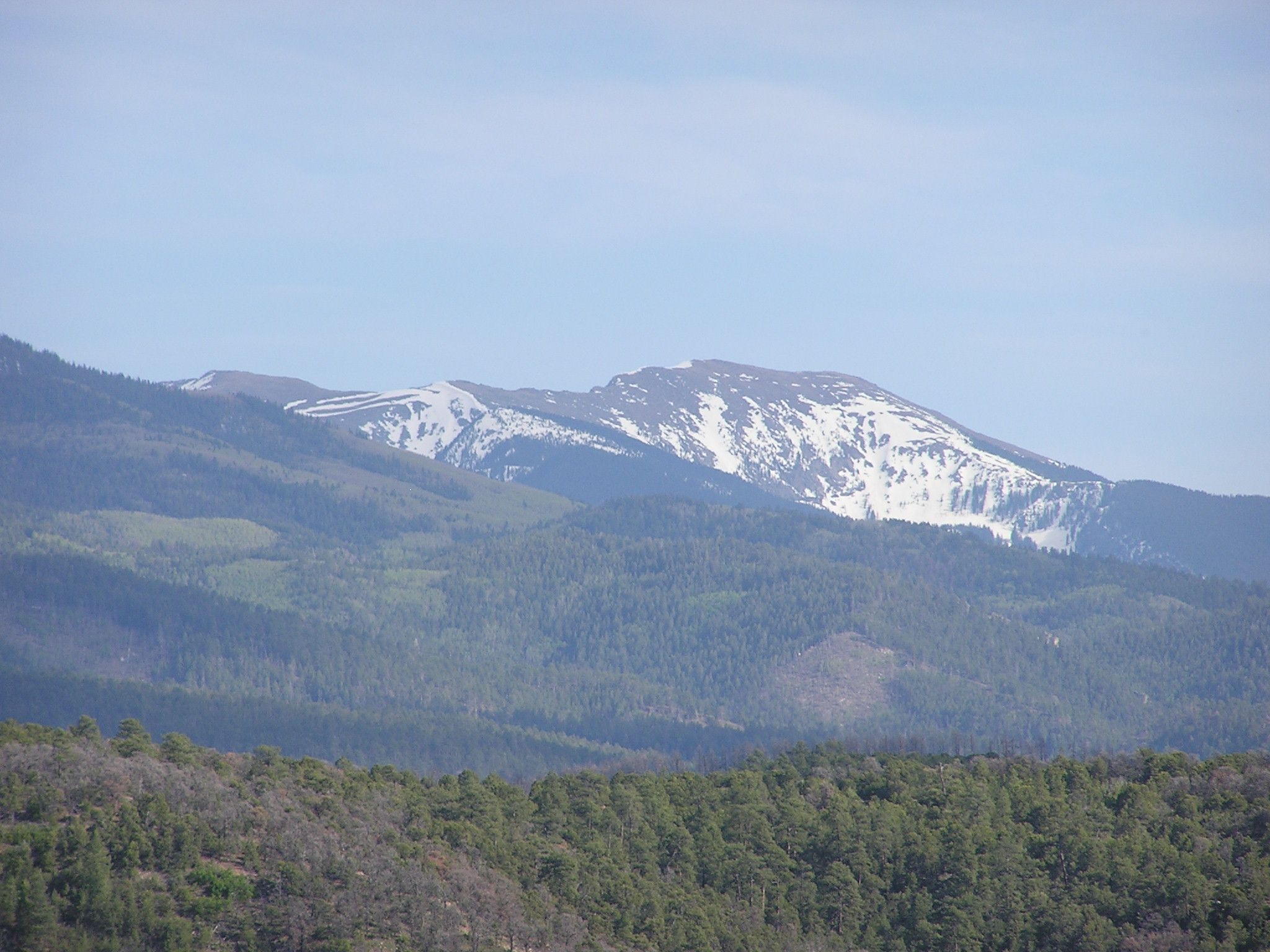
View of Santa Fe Baldy, in the Sangre de Cristo Mountains, from near Las Trampas.

In 1751, New Mexico governor Tomás Vélez Cachupín, awarded the Las Trampas land grant to twelve families who established the village of Las Trampas. The grant was one of the first made by New Mexico to expand the frontiers of New Mexico and protect the colony from raids of Indian tribes, especially the Comanche who both raided and traded with New Mexico. Specifically, the settlers of Las Trampas had the job of shielding Santa Cruz, 17 miles (27 km) to the southwest from Comanche raids. Other grants with the same objective were being created. Many of the early settlers were genízaros, detribalized Indians with a history of serving as slaves and servants of the Spanish colonists. They were important in the frontier defense of New Mexico. For the genízaros, relocation to Las Trampas and other frontier settlements was a means of acquiring land. The village grew despite the danger of Indian attacks and, by 1776, 63 families comprising 278 individuals were residents.

The boundaries of Spanish and Mexican grants were often vaguely defined but Las Trampas was later authenticated by the U.S. government to consist of 28,132 acres (11,385 ha). A durable peace treaty with the Comanche in 1786 permitted additional settlements in the grant area. Elevations in the grant area ranged from 7,300 ft (2,200 m) at Las Trampas village to Trampas Peak with an elevation of 12,200 ft (3,700 m) Vegetation ranged from piñon woodland at the lowest elevations up to tundra at the highest. No weather stations are located in the grant area but nearby Truchas at an elevation of 8,040 ft (2,450 m) receives 14.7 in (370 mm) annually which makes irrigation important or essential for most crops. By the time of the American conquest of New Mexico in 1846, the population in the grant area is estimated at 1,500 in several settlements in addition to Las Trampas: Ojo Sarco, Romero, El Valle, Diamante, Chamisal, Ojito, Llano and Rodarte.

The Las Trampas Land Grant had a typical pattern of land allocation for a grant to a community (rather than to an individual or an Indian tribe). As private property, each head of household received a narrow strip of land extending from the Trampas River, across the mostly-flat, irrigatable valley bordering the river, and extending to the top of the ridge surrounding the stream valley. With new generations, the strips of land were sub-divided among descendants. This land could be bought and sold.

Outside of the privately owned strips of land, most of the land within the grant was common property, managed by the community and utilized in common for livestock grazing, timber harvesting, firewood, and hunting and gathering. The common property, under Spanish and Mexican law, was not salable or transferable. It belonged to the community as a whole.

== Mexican vs U.S. law ==
After its conquest of New Mexico in 1846, the United States agreed in the Treaty of Guadalupe Hidalgo (1848) that all residents of former Mexican territory would have the rights of U.S. citizens and "their liberty, property, and civil rights shall be protected." However, U.S. and Mexican land law and custom differed. The U.S. regarded land as a commodity which could be bought and sold and the precise ownership verified by documentation and registration of ownership with the appropriate government authority. Spanish and Mexican practices, by contrast, saw land as a community asset to be used by the community rather than a commodity to be bought and sold. Boundaries of land were imprecise and custom, rather than documentation, often dictated land ownership and rights of use. To sort out who owned what in New Mexico, the U.S. created the Office of the Surveyor General in 1854. The Las Trampas Land Grant was one of the first land grants adjudicated by the Surveyor General, confirmed in 1860 and surveyed to contain 28,131.66 acres (11,384.48 ha).

== The Santa Fe Ring ==
The millions of acres of land in land grants in New Mexico were a target of opportunity for Anglo land speculators and many Hispanos who became their allies. Some of the Surveyors General became allied with the Santa Fe Ring, a group of "ambitious, unscrupulous Anglo lawyers who regarded the confused legal status of the land grants as an ideal opportunity for adding money and land to their personal assets."

Most of the Hispano residents living on grant lands were poor, uneducated, unable to speak English, and unfamiliar with the American legal system. Many of them would be dispossessed of their land in court proceedings unknown to them and taking place far from their homes.

== Sale of Las Trampas ==
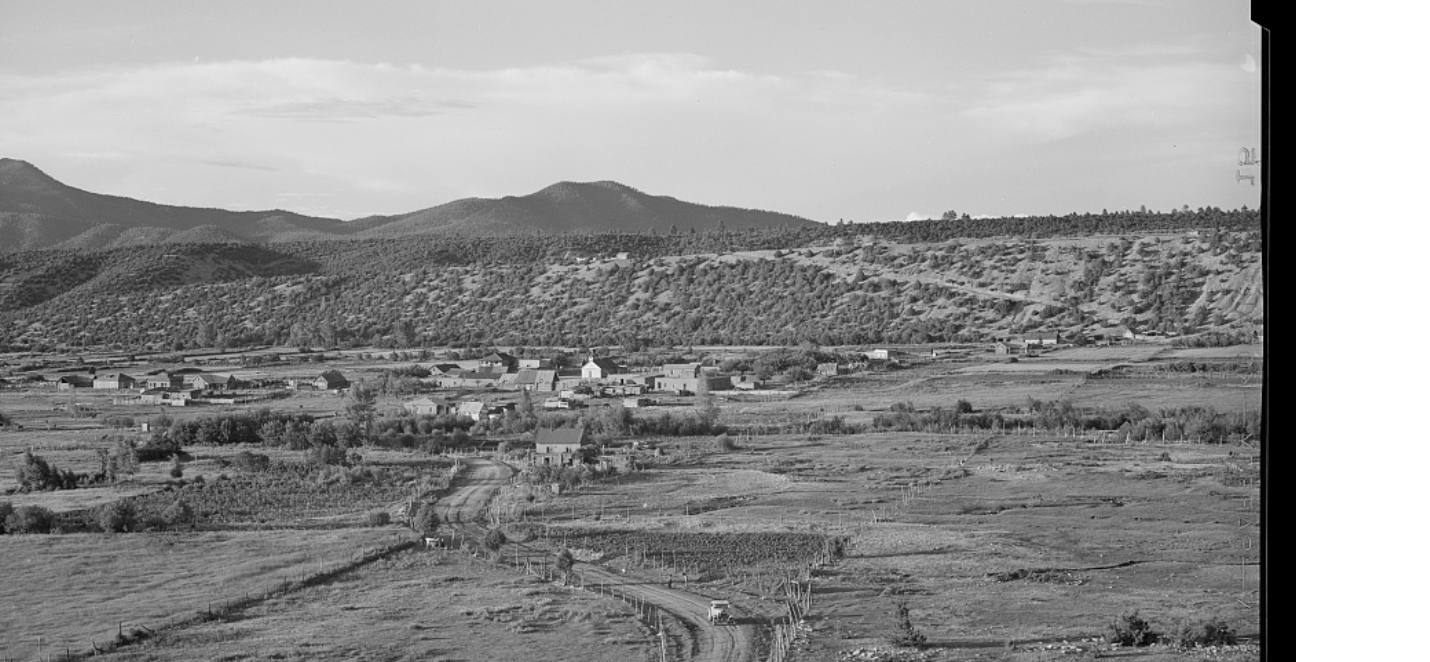
The hamlet of Rodarte, a farming settlement on the Las Trampas Land Grant. (1940)

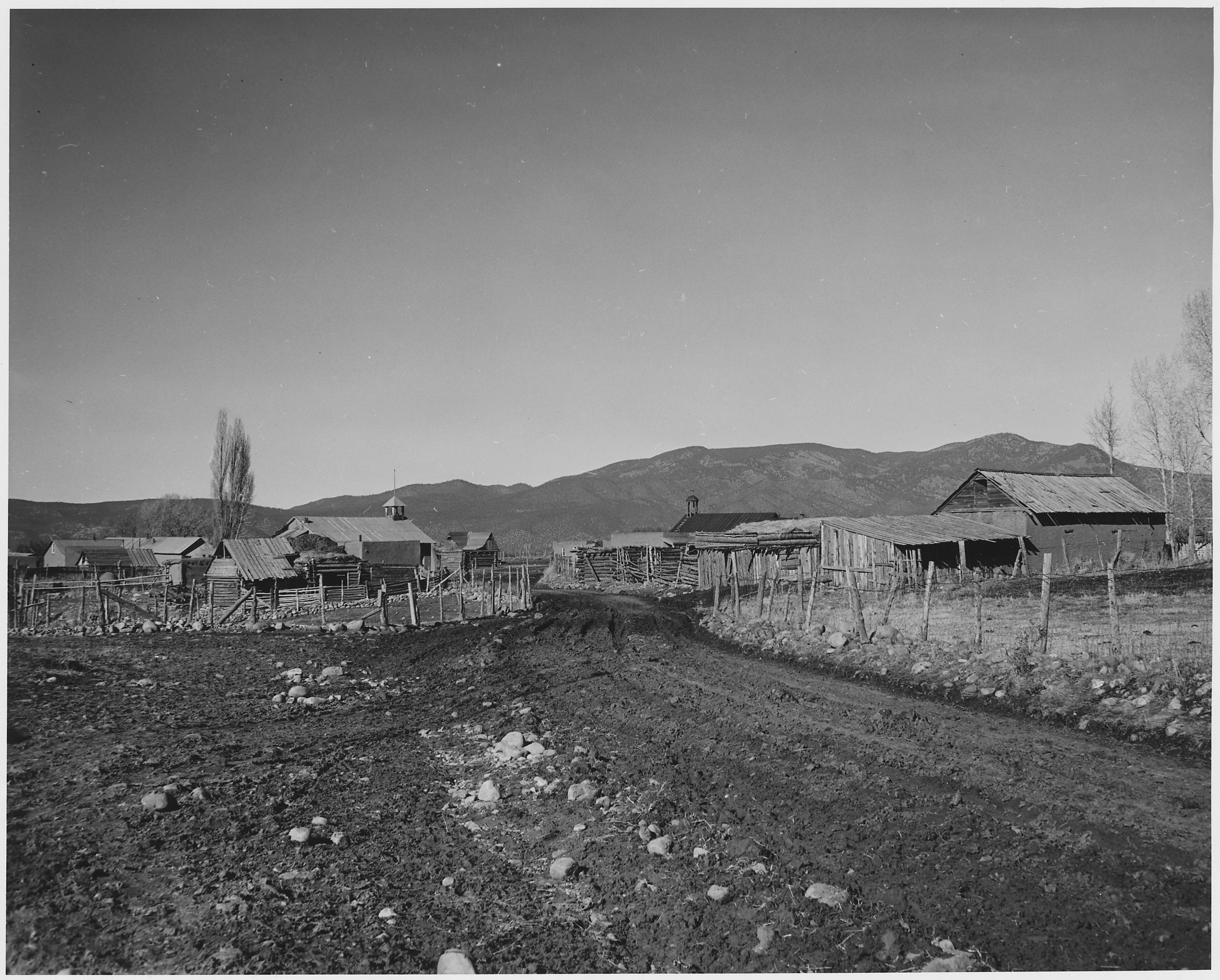
The settlement of Llano (1941).

The residents and stakeholders of Las Trampas were little impacted by the land speculators until 1900. In that year an indebted descendant of one of the original settlers and four others petitioned the court for "partition" of the Las Trampas grant. The possibility of partition came about as a result of an 1876 law under which a stakeholder in a grant could request that the common lands be divided among its owners. If the grant could not be divided without decreasing its value, said the law, the common lands must be sold in to the highest bidder. The law permitted a minority—only five in this case—of the land grant descendants to request partition of all the common lands of the grant even though the great majority of the owners, in this case about 300, might be opposed or unaware of the legal proceeding. The courts usually found that dividing the grant would decrease its value. Partition was therefore impractical and the court ruled that the common lands must be sold. Requests for partition was one of the ways that members of the Santa Fe Ring acquired grant land or profited from legal disputes concerning its ownership and disposition. One of the prominent members of the Ring was the attorney for the petitioners.

The court appointed a referee to determine which lands in the Las Trampas grant were private and which were common lands. (The referee's assistant was a Hispano associate of the Santa Fe Ring.) The referee found that only 650 acres (260 ha) of the grant were private property and that the other 27,483 acres (11,122 ha) were common land. DeBuys describes the ruling as "preposterous" for its conclusion that each of 300 owners owned only a couple of acres of land, this in a harsh mountain land in which 40 acres might be required to pasture a single cow and her calf. The findings of the referee were sent to a trio of commissioners (including one who was a brother of a Santa Fe Ring associate). They declared partition impossible and, therefore, in accordance with the law, required that the common lands of the grant be sold at auction.

In 1903, the commons lands were sold—although at that time most of the residents on the grant were not aware of the sale and that the common lands of the grant were no longer theirs. The share of the proceeds from the sale received by the 300 stakeholders amounted to $25 each. The sale and subsequent resales incited additional legal struggles over a period of years in which the attorneys benefited from fees. In 1913, the private land owned by the residents and excluded from sale of the common land was re-computed to a more reasonable 6,950 acres (2,810 ha), thus leaving about 21,000 acres (8,500 ha) of former common land in the ownership of a timber company.

The final disposition of the common land in the grant came in 1926 when a timber company bought the common land from another timber company for $63,320 -- $3.00 per acre—and traded it to the U.S. Forest Service for timberlands near Grants, New Mexico. The former common lands became part of the Carson National Forest. The management of the land by the Forest Service resulted in restrictions on the traditional uses of the land by the residents on the former grant. In 2019, an agreement was reached between the Forest Service and the residents to cooperate in the management of the forest land in the Trampas area. The scenic High Road to Taos passes through the grant area and the village of Las Trampas.

== See also ==
- Land grants in New Mexico and Colorado
