= La Democracia, Guatemala =

La Democracia, Guatemala may refer to the following municipalities:

- La Democracia, Escuintla
- La Democracia, Huehuetenango
