= Cordova, New Mexico =

- Census-designated place (CDP)
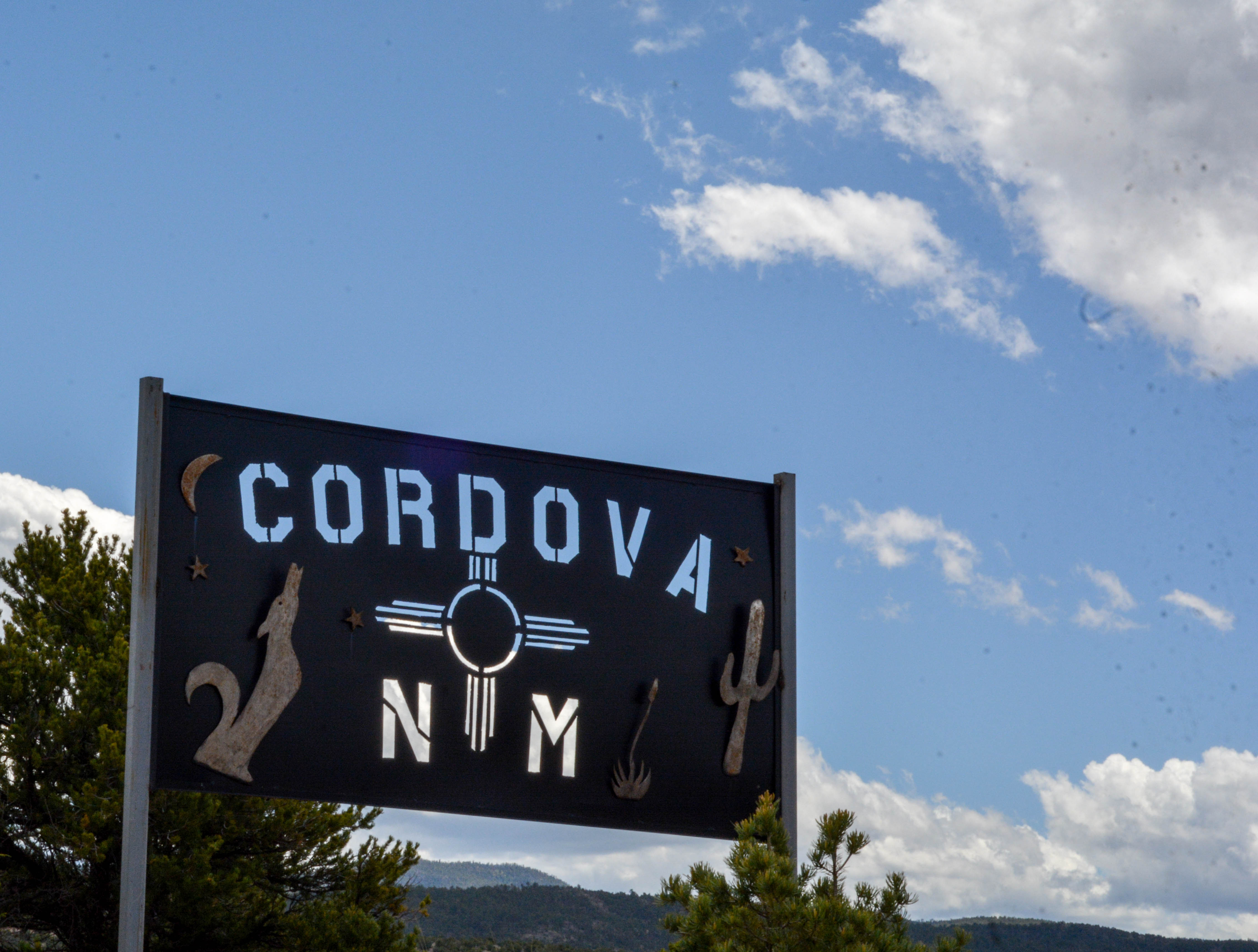
- Cordova city sign, May 2015

- Location within New Mexico
- Coordinates: 36°00′26″N 105°51′38″W
- Country: United States
- State: New Mexico
- County: Rio Arriba

Area
  - Total: 1.66 sq mi (4.31 km^{2})
  - Land: 1.66 sq mi (4.31 km^{2})
  - Water: 0 sq mi (0.00 km^{2})
- Elevation: 7,146 ft (2,178 m)

Population (2020)
  - Total: 380
  - Density: 228.5/sq mi (88.21/km^{2})
- Time zone: UTC-7 (Mountain (MST))
  - Summer (DST): UTC-6 (MDT)
- ZIP code: 87523
- Area code: 505
- GNIS feature ID: 2584081

Cordova is a census-designated place in Rio Arriba County, New Mexico, United States.

As of the 2020 census, Cordova had a population of 380.

== Description ==
The place-name Cordova derives from the Spanish surname Cordova (or Cordoba). The town takes its name from the surname of Matías Córdova, one of the inhabitants of Pueblo Quemado, the original name of the town. The word cordova derives from the name of the Spanish city Córdoba

The village lies a short distance off the "High Road to Taos", New Mexico State Road 76, between Chimayo and Truchas.

Its population was 414 as of the 2010 census. Cordova has a post office with ZIP code 87523, which opened on March 26, 1900. Cordova is well known for wood carvers.

Cordova was the scene of a serigraph completed 1946-1947 on wove paper, "Street in Cordova, New Mexico" made by noted Oregon born printmaker Norma Bassett Hall (d. 1957) Size 8.875 x 11.5 in. Held in 2015 by the Lockhart Family Collection. It features a view up to the Pecos mountains from a street scene containing a narrow adobe dwelling lined street, three adults and a child, and the rear and steeple of the church. The scene is awash in light with predominant beige and white tones.

== Demographics ==
Historical population
| Census | Pop. | Note | %± |
|---|---|---|---|
| 2020 | 380 | | — |
U.S. Decennial Census

== See also ==
- List of census-designated places in New Mexico
