= Chamisal, New Mexico =

Census-designated place in Taos County, New Mexico, United States

- Census-designated place
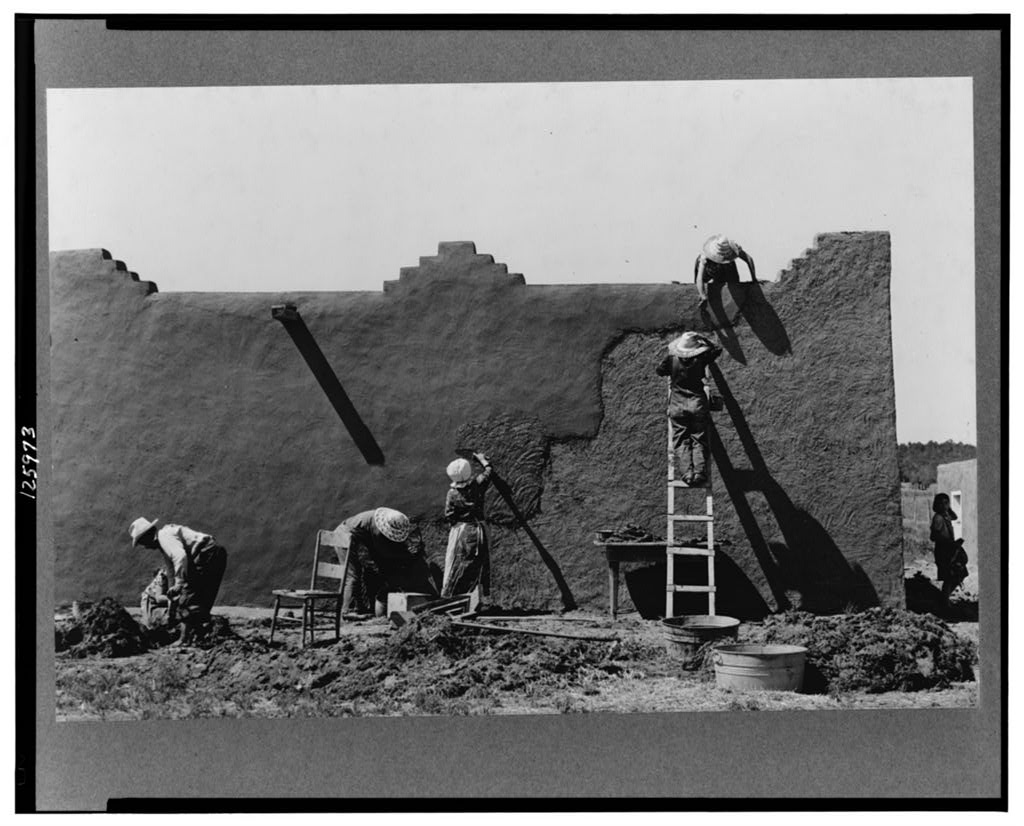
- Remudding an adobe wall in Chamisal, circa 1940. Photo: Russell Lee

- Location of Chamisal, New Mexico

- Location in the United States
- Coordinates: 36°10′24″N 105°44′57″W
- Country: United States
- State: New Mexico
- County: Taos

Area
  - Total: 1.64 sq mi (4.25 km^{2})
  - Land: 1.64 sq mi (4.25 km^{2})
  - Water: 0 sq mi (0.00 km^{2})
- Elevation: 7,408 ft (2,258 m)

Population (2020)
  - Total: 255
  - Density: 155.4/sq mi (60.01/km^{2})
- Time zone: UTC−07:00 (Mountain (MST))
  - Summer (DST): UTC−06:00 (MDT)
- ZIP Codes: 87521
- Area code: Area code 575
- FIPS code: 35-14110
- GNIS feature ID: 2408009

Chamisal is a census-designated place (CDP) in Taos County, New Mexico. It is located along the scenic High Road to Taos. As of the 2020 census, Chamisal had a population of 255. Chamisal was founded by settlers on the Las Trampas Land Grant which dates back to 1751.

== Geography ==
According to the United States Census Bureau, the CDP has a total area of 1.6 square miles (4.1 km^{2}), all land.

== Demographics ==
Historical population
Census	Pop.	Note	%±
2020	255		—
U.S. Decennial Census

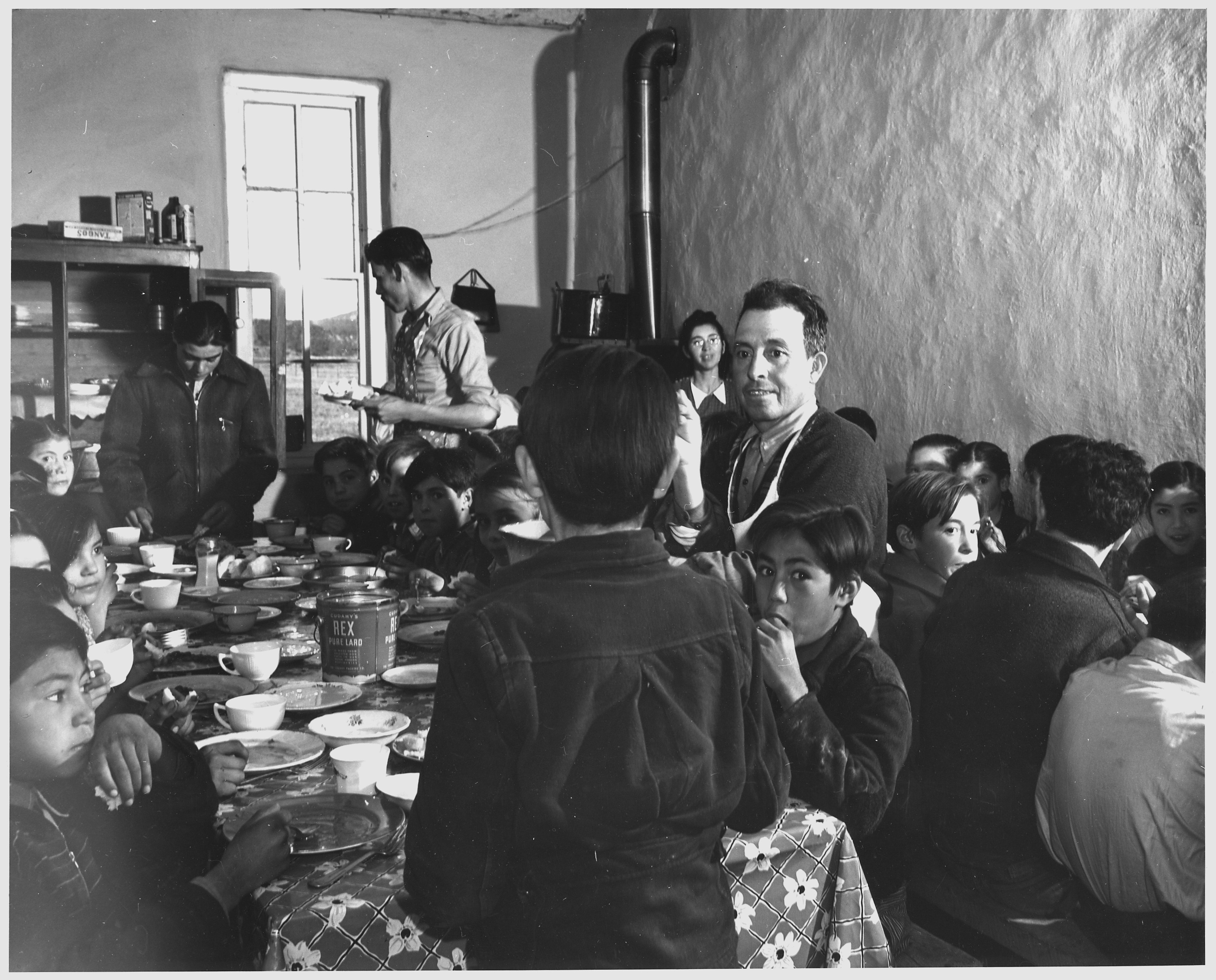
Hot lunch at Chamisal School 1941

As of the census of 2000, there were 301 people, 121 households, and 79 families residing in the CDP. The population density was 182.6 inhabitants per square mile (70.5/km^{2}). There were 156 housing units at an average density of 94.6 per square mile (36.5/km^{2}). The racial makeup of the CDP was 16.28% White, 0.33% African American, 0.66% Native American, 0.33% Pacific Islander, 76.08% from other races, and 6.31% from two or more races. Hispanic or Latino of any race were 92.03% of the population.

There were 121 households, out of which 26.4% had children under the age of 18 living with them, 49.6% were married couples living together, 11.6% had a female householder with no husband present, and 33.9% were non-families. 31.4% of all households were made up of individuals, and 12.4% had someone living alone who was 65 years of age or older. The average household size was 2.49 and the average family size was 3.18.

In the CDP the population was spread out, with 24.6% under the age of 18, 4.7% from 18 to 24, 25.9% from 25 to 44, 28.6% from 45 to 64, and 16.3% who were 65 years of age or older. The median age was 40 years. For every 100 females there were 98.0 males. For every 100 females age 18 and over, there were 94.0 males.

The median income for a household in the CDP was $18,250, and the median income for a family was $29,286. Males had a median income of $25,357 versus $15,938 for females. The per capita income for the CDP was $8,641. About 18.6% of families and 30.2% of the population were below the poverty line, including 33.7% of those under the age of eighteen and 38.3% of those 65 or over.

== Education ==
The community is in the Peñasco Independent School District.

== See also ==
- List of census-designated places in New Mexico
