= NIC-1 (Nicaragua highway) =

Highway in Nicaragua

National Highway 1
- Autopista nacional NIC-1

Route information
- Length: 238.47 km (148.18 mi)

Major junctions
- North end: CA-1 on the border with Honduras
- South end: NIC-4 in Managua

Location
- Country: Nicaragua

Highway system
- Transport in Nicaragua

NIC-1 is a national highway located in Nicaragua. The highway begins in the south just behind the Palacio de la Cultura with the NIC-4 in the section of Carretera Norte in Managua until it ends in the north near Somoto on the border with Honduras, and continuing as CA-1. The road is 238.47 kilometres (148.18 mi) long.
