= George López =

American wood carver (1900–1993)

George T. López (April 23, 1900 – December 23, 1993) was a renowned Santos woodcarver who was awarded the National Heritage Fellowship by the National Endowment for the Arts in 1982. He was born in the small village of Cordova, New Mexico, which is situated in a small valley of the Sangre de Cristo Mountains.

The village was founded in the sixteenth century by some of the earliest Spanish settlers to the region, and the town itself has an international reputation for its continuing tradition of religious wood carving. López's family was an important part of that tradition with George being the sixth-generation santero of the family. He is the son of the legendary carver and furniture maker Jose Delores Lopez, 1868–1937, who is credited with reviving the tradition of santo carving in Cordova.

López started working at camps, farms and road crews at the age of fifteen to help support his family. After his father's death, he worked construction jobs in Los Alamos, New Mexico. In 1952 he quit his construction job and made carving his full-time profession.

López was profiled in a January 1991 National Geographic magazine article.
