= Truchas, New Mexico =

Census-designated place in Rio Arriba County, New Mexico, United States

- Unincorporated community
- Location within the state of New Mexico Location within the United States
- Coordinates: 36°02′37″N 105°48′40″W
- Country: United States
- State: New Mexico
- County: Rio Arriba
- Elevation: 8,048 ft (2,453 m)

Population (2023)
  - Total: 278
- Time zone: UTC-7 (Mountain (MST))
  - Summer (DST): UTC-6 (MDT)

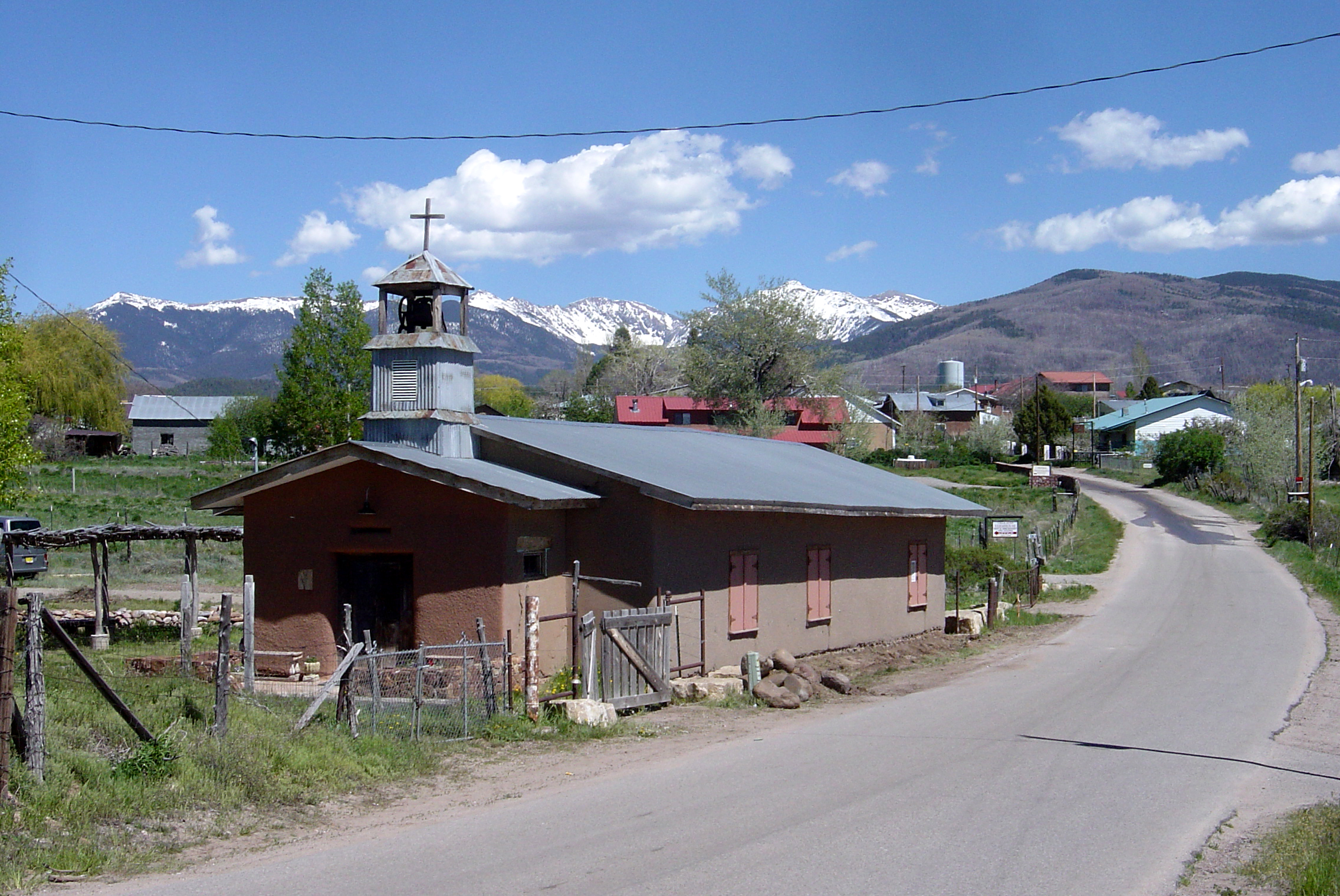
Truchas, with the Truchas Peaks in background

Truchas is a census-designated place in Rio Arriba County, New Mexico, United States. Located along the scenic High Road to Taos, Truchas ("trout" in Spanish) it is halfway between Santa Fe in the south, and Taos to the north. Truchas has the ZIP code 87578. The 87578 ZIP Code Tabulation Area, which includes the nearby village of Cordova, New Mexico, had a population of 278 in 2023.

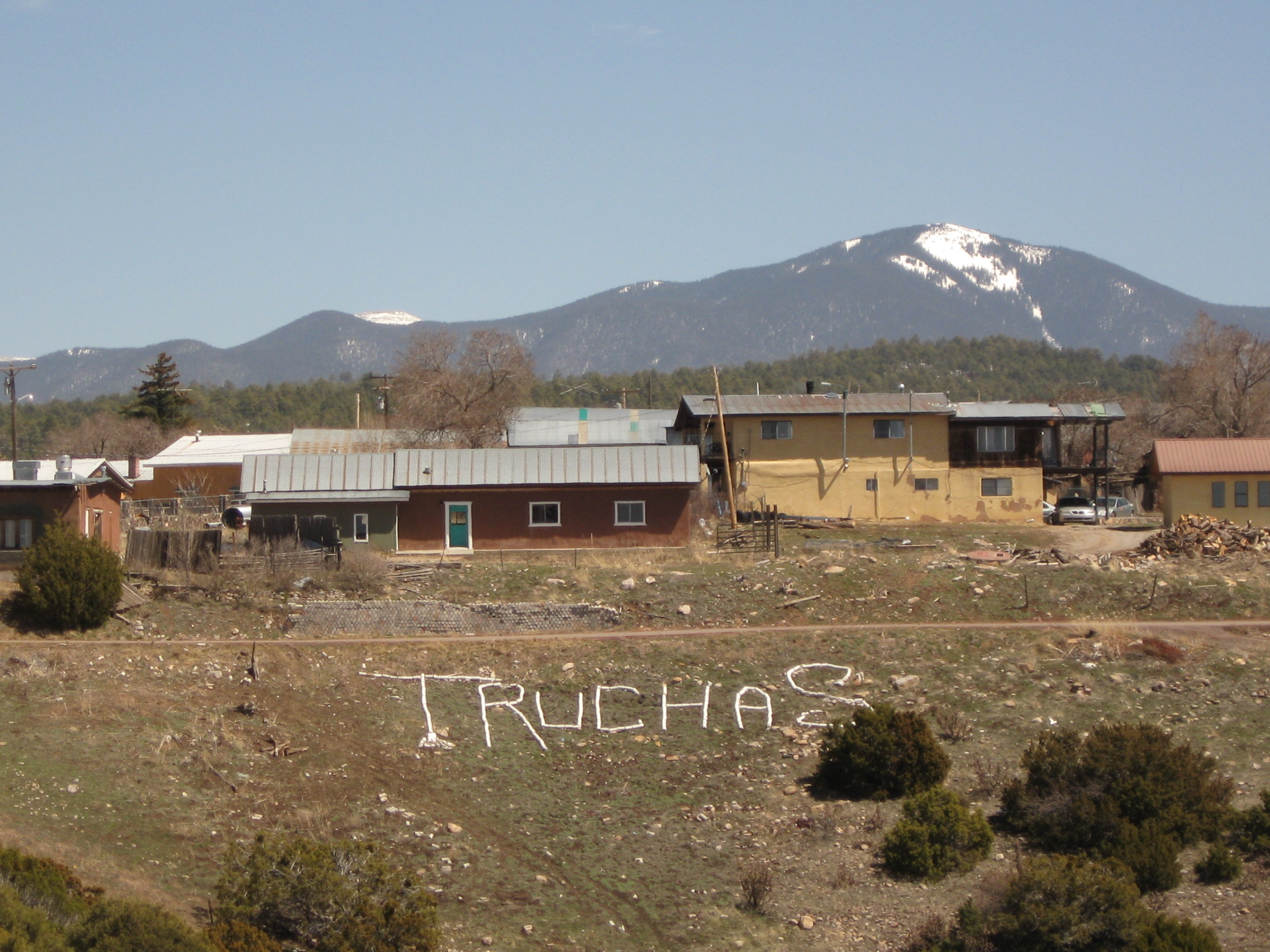
Truchas in 2010

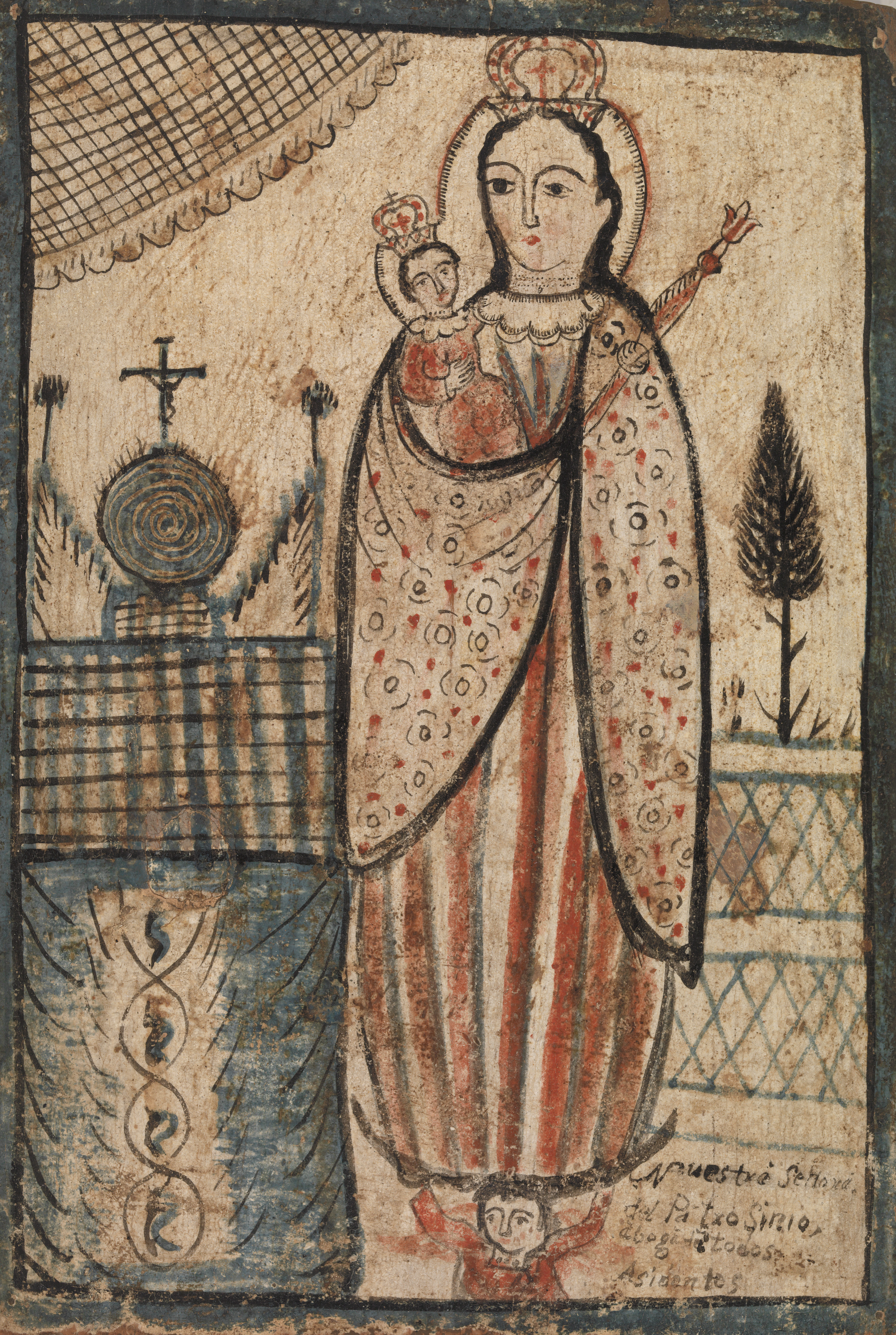
Nuestra Señora del Patrocinio panel c. 1815, by Pedro Antonio Fresquis, the "Truchas Master"

Straddling a high ridge, the community began as the Nuestra Señora del Rosario, San Fernando y Santiago del Rio de las Truchas Grant, a Spanish land grant in 1754 and, due to its geography and location, remained a relatively unchanged outpost over the centuries. The land grant is commonly known as the Truchas Land Grant, gaining its name from the river that provides the water for irrigation of the land. Truchas is the Spanish word for trout.

== History ==
In the mid-18th century the population of the Spanish colony of New Mexico, consisting of seven to eight thousand Hispanos and fewer than 10,000 Puebloans (Indians) scattered along the Rio Grande valley, was besieged by Native Americans (Indians) on all sides. New Mexico was in "a state of miserable panic." To protect the colony, the governor of New Mexico authorized the establishment of settlements on its frontiers.

On March 18, 1754, New Mexican governor Tomás Vélez Cachupin awarded the Nuestro Señora del Rosario, San Fernando y Santiago del Rio de las Truchas Grant, to eleven residents of the nearby settlements of Chimayo and Pueblo Quemado. The grantees had asserted their claim to the area of the grant during the two previous years by constructing an acequia (irrigation canal) and planting crops. The grantees were small farmers. The area of the Truchas land grant was later measured to be 14,786.58 acres (5,983.92 ha). The early settlers established their village on a high shoulder of the Sangre de Cristo mountains at an elevation of 8,000 ft (2,400 m). With labor and hand tools, they build an acequia several miles long to bring water down from the flanks of Truchas Peak to irrigate their crops. Maize would not grow in the cool climate at this altitude so wheat and livestock were their main crops.

The primary purpose of the grant and neighboring grants such as Trampas was to protect the populous region and town of Santa Cruz, 12 miles (19 km) southwest, from raids by the Ute, Apache, and, especially, the Comanche. They were important in the frontier defense of New Mexico. For the landless poor people of New Mexico, relocation to Truchas and other frontier settlements was a means of acquiring land.

The governor stipulated conditions for the grant holders. One square league (approximately 40 percent of the grant area) was to be set aside as common land for grazing, firewood, and timber. Farm land was to be divided up equally among the settlers. The settlers were to build houses connected with each other in a square around an interior plaza with only one entrance. The purpose of the building plan was defense against Indian raids. In times of trouble, the livestock of the settlers was driven into the plaza. Finally, the settlers were prohibited from selling their land for four years.

In the 1770s raids by the Comanches became more serious. The Truchas settlers appealed for firearms and reinforcements from the governor, but they received no help. The Comanches both traded and raided the New Mexico settlements and in 1774, the Spanish captured eight Comanche men and eleven women who were trading in Taos. They imprisoned them in Truchas in a tower built for defense within the compound. Attempting to escape, the Comanches killed two guards, but were trapped within the tower. The Comanche refused to surrender. The settlers set fire to the tower and all the Comanches were killed while fleeing the burning tower.

In 1776, Fray Francisco Atanasio Dominguez said that Truchas has a population of 26 families and 122 persons and that the population had doubled since its founding in 1754.

A paved road did not enter the community till the early 1970s. These very same issues made the community attractive to artists moving to Northern New Mexico for its thriving arts scene, particularly after Robert Redford's The Milagro Beanfield War (1988) was filmed there. Due to the influx of artists and artisans moving to the area, several art galleries have also been built or established. The arrival of artists and artisans has altered the traditional pace of agricultural life among the original Spanish settlers, at times leading to tensions, which have more recently receded. There are also a number of vacation and second homes in the village and in the surrounding area. The area’s population is older than national average as many younger residents move away for education or job opportunities, and the existing adult population ages into seniority.

== Attractions ==
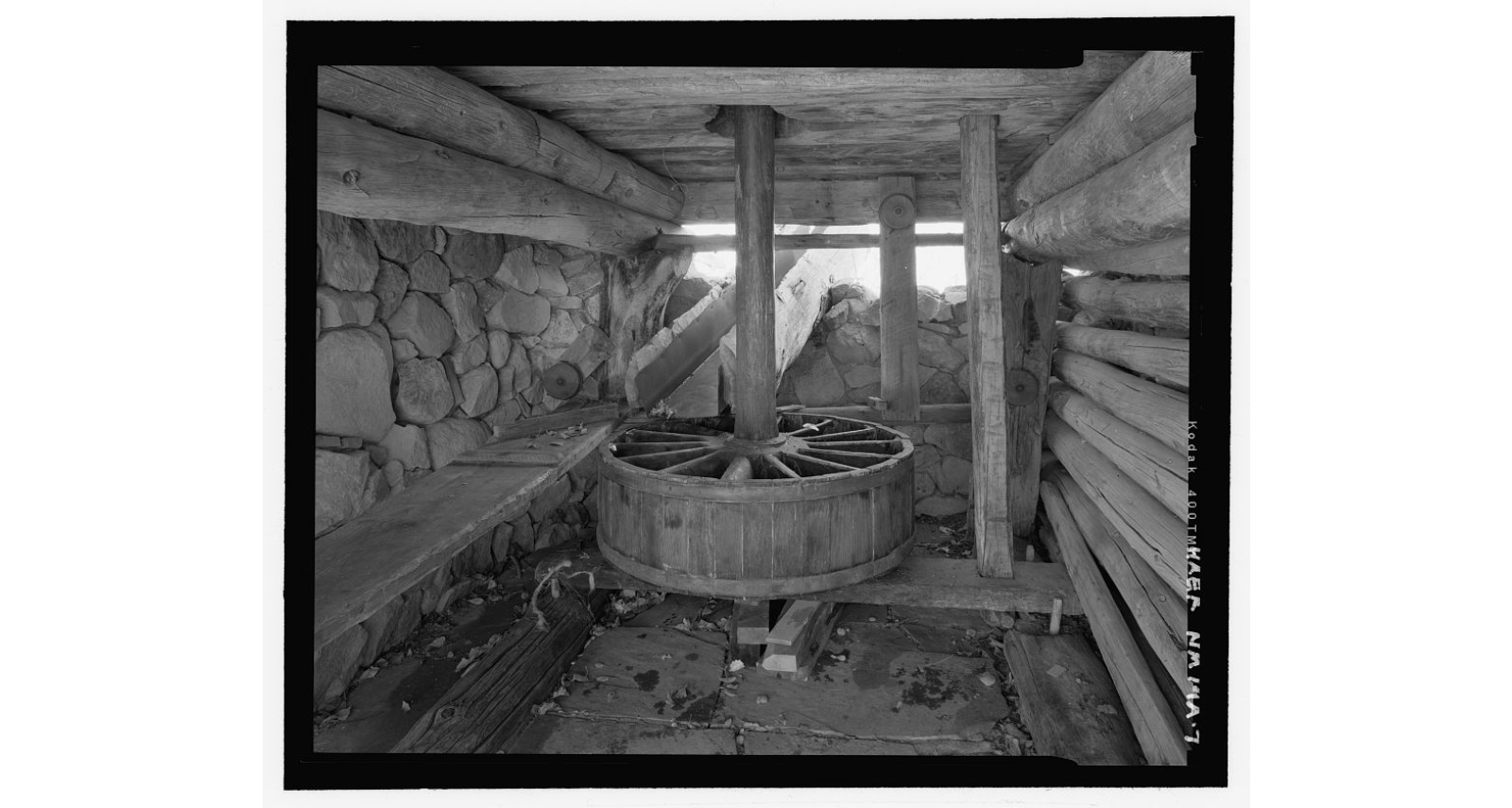
A horizontal water wheel which powered a grist mill in Truchas from 1873 to 1940.

The area around Truchas still operates under many of the original Spanish land grant bylaws; for example, cars must share the roads with livestock. The community has close views of the Truchas Peaks (5,000 feet above the community) and of the Española Valley. Truchas is along the scenic High Road to Taos which goes from Santa Fe to Taos. The high road attracts many tourists.

Nuestra Señora del Rosario is the name of the early nineteenth-century church in the center of the village. The church contains two large altar-screens (reredos) by the renowned santero Pedro Antonio Fresquis. One screen is dated 1821, and there are other fine examples of early nineteenth-century santero art in the church.

== See also ==
- List of census-designated places in New Mexico
