= Chiapas–Guatemala Cartel =

- Founding location: Chiapas
- Years active: 2022-present
- Territory: Chiapas and Guatemala
- Ethnicity: Mexicans, Guatemalans
- Leader: Walfre Donaldo Calderón-Calderón
- Activities: Drug trafficking, murder
- Allies: Jalisco New Generation Cartel
- Rivals: Sinaloa Cartel

The Chiapas–Guatemala Cartel (Cártel de Chiapas y Guatemala) (Note: Also called the Cartel of Chiapas and Guatemala. Commonly abbreviated as CCyG in Spanish.) is a Mexican cartel that is active in Chiapas and parts of Guatemala. It emerged as a splinter group of the Sinaloa Cartel.

== Background ==
Chiapas has seen a spike in violence in recent years due to a turf war between the Sinaloa Cartel and Jalisco New Generation Cartel over trafficking routes. This has led to the largest refugee crisis in Chiapas since the Zapatista uprising of 1994, with over 6 mass forced displacements caused by cartels in 2023-2024.

=== Origins ===
In 2021, armed gunmen allied with the Jalisco New Generation Cartel killed Ramón Gilberto Rivera Estrada (El Junior) in Tuxtla Gutiérrez. He was the son of Gilberto Rivera Amarillas, who was the ringleader of the Sinaloa Cartel's operations in Chiapas until 2016, when he was arrested at La Aurora International Airport in Guatemala City.

With the loss of El Junior, the Sinaloa Cartel lost hold of their territory in Chiapas; this led to the Jalisco Cartel's gradual expansion into the state, and to a lesser extent into Guatemala.

Juan Manuel Valdovinos Mendoza, one of the main members of the Sinaloa Cartel in Chiapas, attempted to take El Junior's position, but the role was ultimately fulfilled by Jesús Esteban Machado Meza, who had been dispatched by El Mayo himself. This decision angered him, and he defected to CJNG (the main local rival) shortly after.

Valdovinos Mendoza's betrayal, combined with the local CJNG cell and a small group from the hamlet of Vueltamina in Guatemala, all contributed to the founding of the Chiapas–Guatemala Cartel in 2022 by Baldemar Calderón Carrillo, aka. Don Balde, who was killed in July 2025.

== Activities ==
In Chiapas, the group is most active in the regions of the Soconusco and the Sierra Mariscal in southern Chiapas. As a Mexican cartel, they primarily operate here, however they do enter Guatemala and collaborate with local criminal groups there.

In Guatemala, the cartel is primarily involved in illegal drug trafficking through the Guatemala–Mexico border, specifically the Chiapas-Huehuetenango land border. The border checkpoint between La Mesilla in Guatemala and Frontera Comalapa in Mexico is the largest between the two countries, and especially important for the cartel. The Guatemalan department of San Marcos is also used for trafficking.

Recently, the cartel has published videos of executions of rival cartel members, including a beheading of someone from La Mayiza (a faction of the Sinaloa Cartel) in 2026.

== Geography ==
The Río Suchiate forms the southernmost part of the Guatemala-Mexico border, and the Río Usumacinta forms much of the border that separates Petén from Chiapas. The cartel's cross-border trafficking activities mainly occur within these two rivers.

The municipalities on the Mexican side of this region have seen the most violence from the cartel, including Frontera Comalapa, Motozintla, Chicomuselo, and Amatenango de la Frontera.

== Arrests ==
In March 2026, four members of the Cártel de Chiapas y Guatemala were arrested in Jiquipilas, when they were found with methamphetamine.

== See also ==
- Mexican drug war
- Guatemala–Mexico relations
- La Concordia massacre
