= La Mesilla =

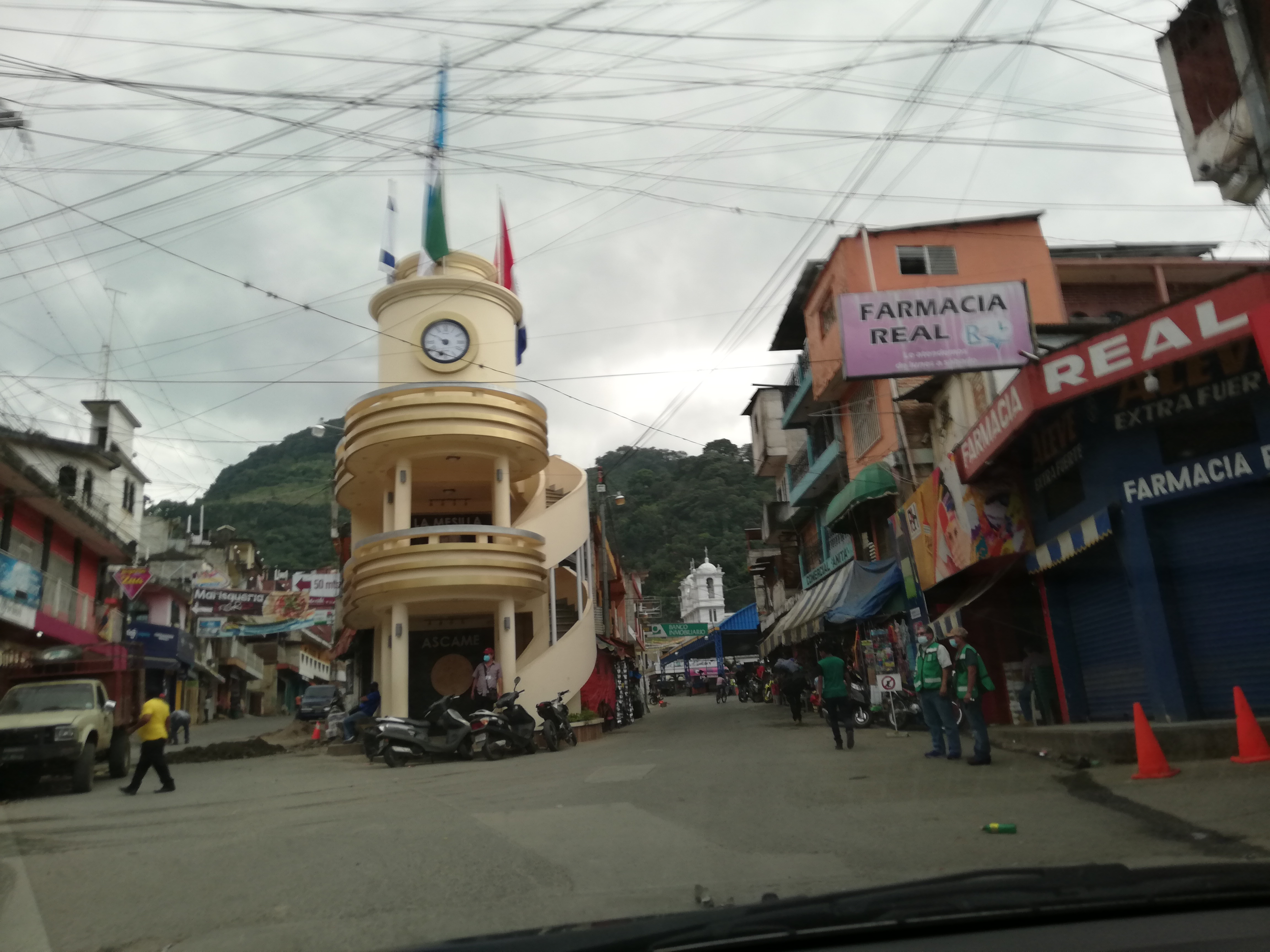
- La Mesilla, Huehuetenango

- Location in Guatemala
- Coordinates: 15°37′00″N 91°58′59″W
- Country: Guatemala
- Department: Huehuetenango
- Municipality: La Democracia

Population
  - Total: 3,200
  - Ethnicities: Mam Ladino
  - Religions: Roman Catholicism Evangelicalism Maya

La Mesilla is a village in La Democracia municipality, Huehuetenango Department, Guatemala. It is the home of Peñarol La Mesilla football club.

La Mesilla lies close to the border with Mexico, between Huehuetenango city and Comitán, Mexico. Central American Highway 1 (CA-1) begins at the border crossing of La Mesilla.
