= San José de Gracia Church =

Historic church in New Mexico, United States

- San Jose de Gracia Church
- U.S. National Register of Historic Places
- U.S. National Historic Landmark
- U.S. National Historic Landmark District – Contributing property
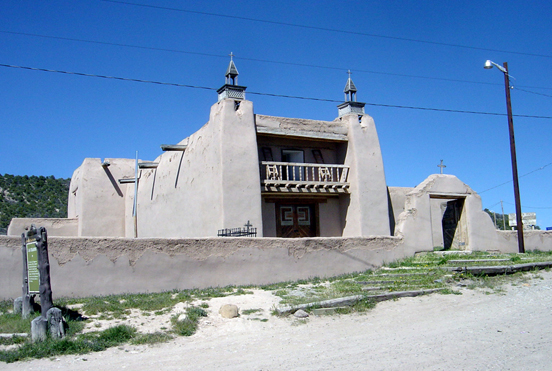

- Location within New Mexico Location within the United States
- Location: N side of the Plaza, Las Trampas, New Mexico
- Coordinates: 36°7′53″N 105°45′28″W
- Area: 0.5 acres (0.20 ha)
- Built: 1760
- Architectural style: Colonial, Spanish Colonial
- Part of: Las Trampas Historic District (ID67000007)
- NRHP reference No.: 70000415

Significant dates
- Added to NRHP: April 15, 1970
- Designated NHL: April 15, 1970
- Designated NHLDCP: May 28, 1967

The San Jose de Gracia Church, also known as Church of Santo Tomas Del Rio de Las Trampas, is a historic church on the main plaza of Las Trampas, New Mexico. Built between 1760 and 1776, it is one of the least-altered examples of a Spanish Colonial Pueblo mission church, with adobe walls rising 34 feet (10 m) in height. It was declared a National Historic Landmark in 1970.

== Description and history ==
The village of Las Trampas is located on New Mexico State Road 76, the "high road" between Santa Fe and Taos. Its main plaza is an open dirt expanse on the east side of that road, with the church on the plaza's north side. The church has a cruciform plan, and is built out of adobe finished in mud plaster. Its nave is 100 feet (30 m) long and 52 feet (16 m) wide (as measured on the outside), with transepts and an apse extending the structure to the north, east, and west. The walls vary in thickness from 4 to 6 feet (1.2 to 1.8 m), and rise to a height of 34 feet (10 m). The adobe roof is supported by vigas overlaid by planking, the vigas mounted into specially shaped corbels. An unusual and distinctive feature of this church is a clerestory window above the nave that is oriented to allow sunlight to fall into the apse area. The main entrance is at the southern end of the nave, between a pair of buttresses, which also support a wooden balcony at the gallery level.

The community of Las Trampas was founded in 1751 by twelve Spanish families. Originally sheltered by an adobe wall that encircled the plaza, the community grew to 63 families in 1776, when the church was completed. The church escaped significant alteration due to the economic isolation of the community until the 20th century. The roof has been replaced several times, including in 1932 by the Society for the Preservation of New Mexico Mission Churches, led by renowned architect John Gaw Meem. The church ceiling is painted with 18th and 19th century designs, and the interior is decorated with notable artworks of 18th and 19th century santeros. The annual feast day is March 19.

== Gallery ==
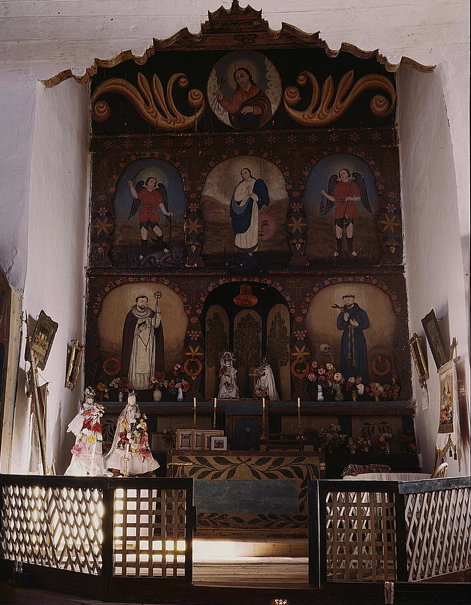
Main altar, San Jose de Gracia, 1943. The main altar screen (and others in the church) were overpainted in 1860 by the Mexican santero Jose de Gracia Gonzales. FSA photograph.

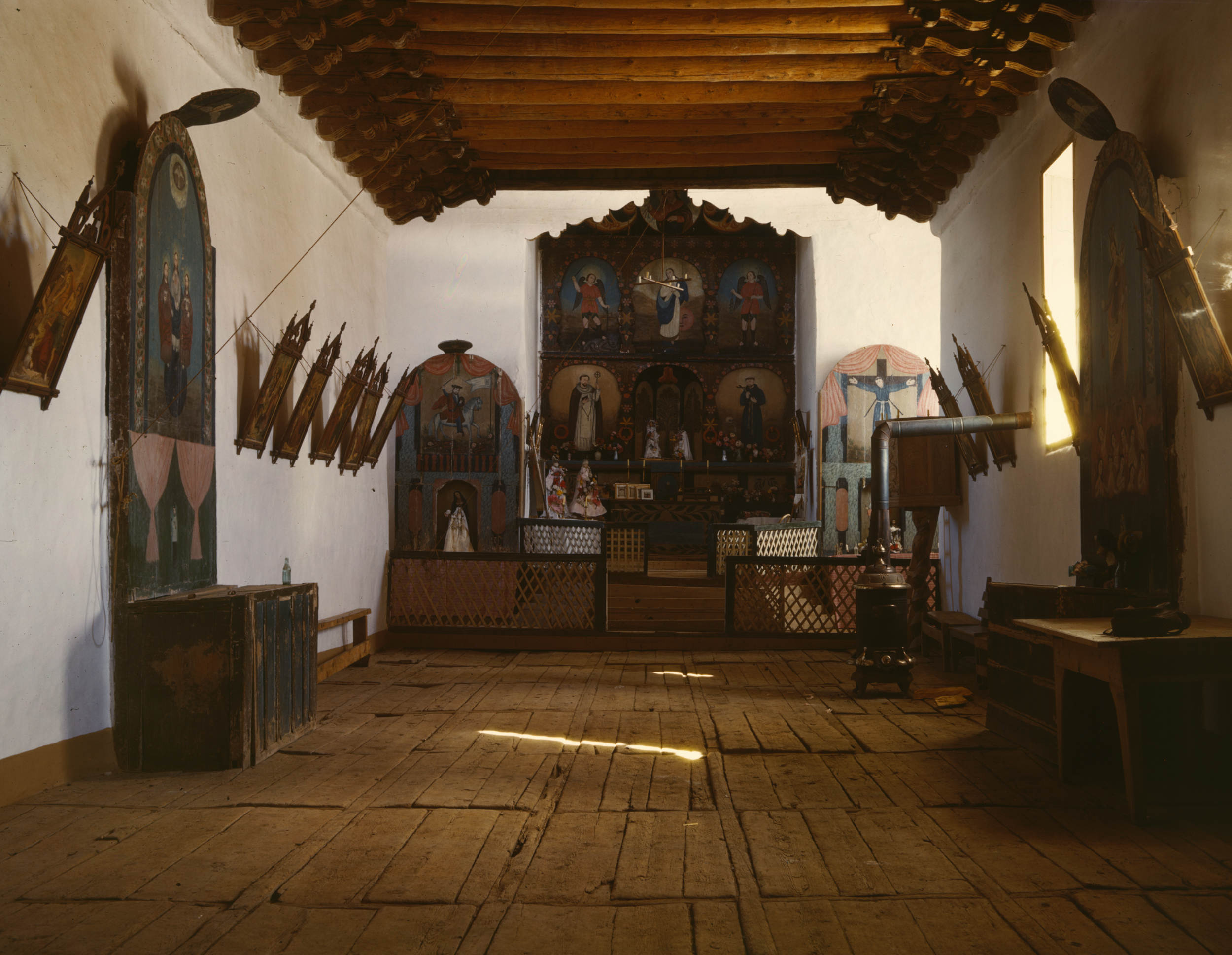
Interior, San Jose de Gracia, 1943. John Collier photo.

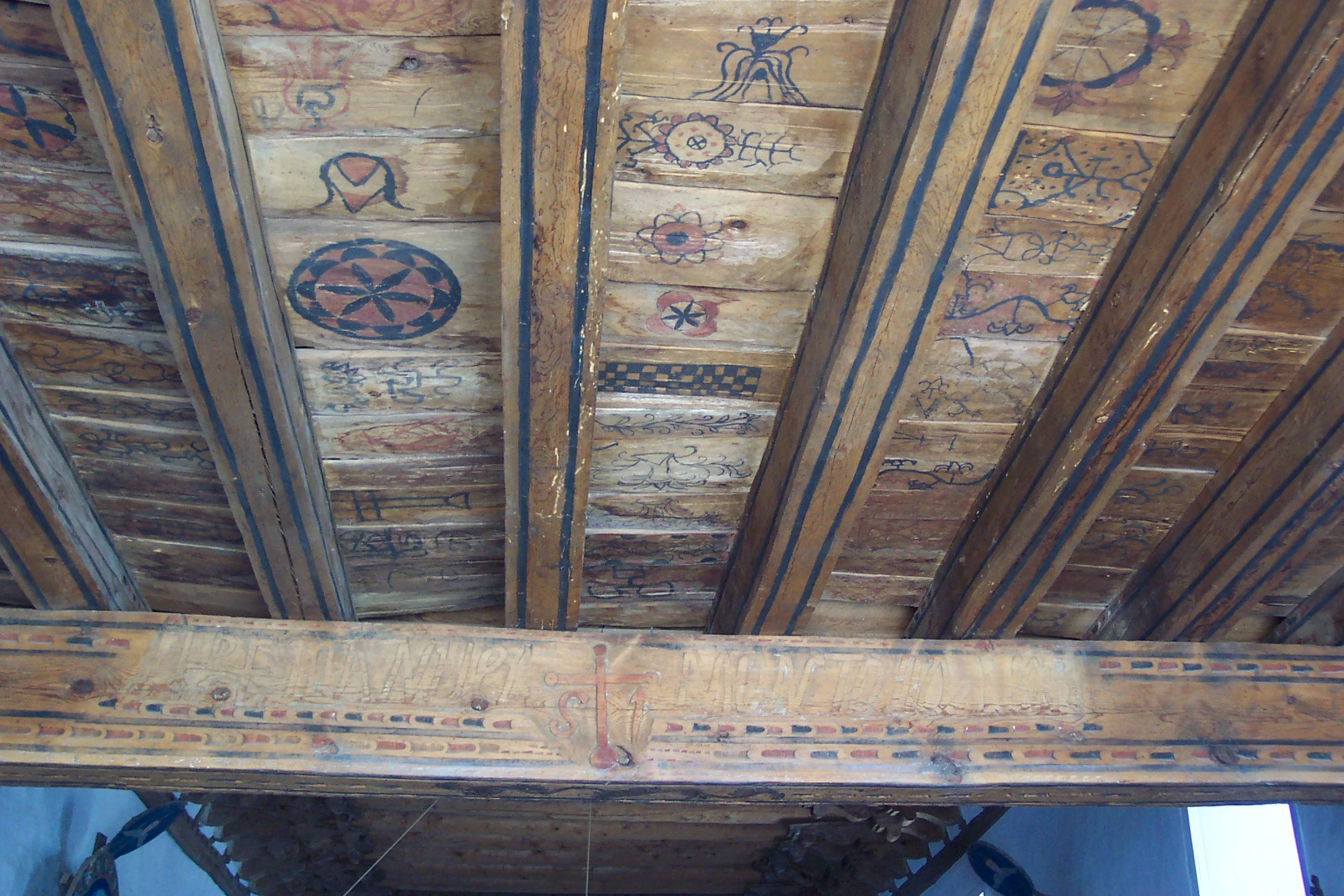
Ceiling of the entrance, painted with 18th and 19th century designs.

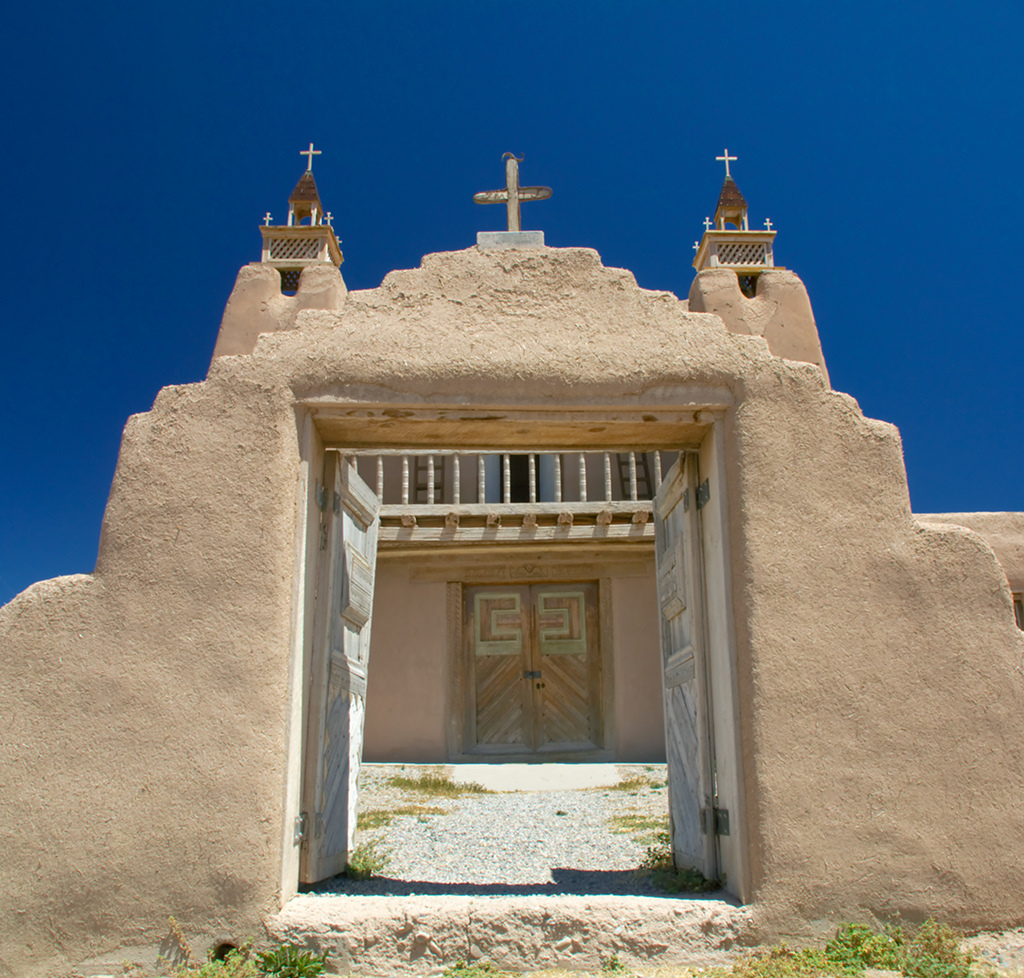
San Jose de Gracia Church front exterior

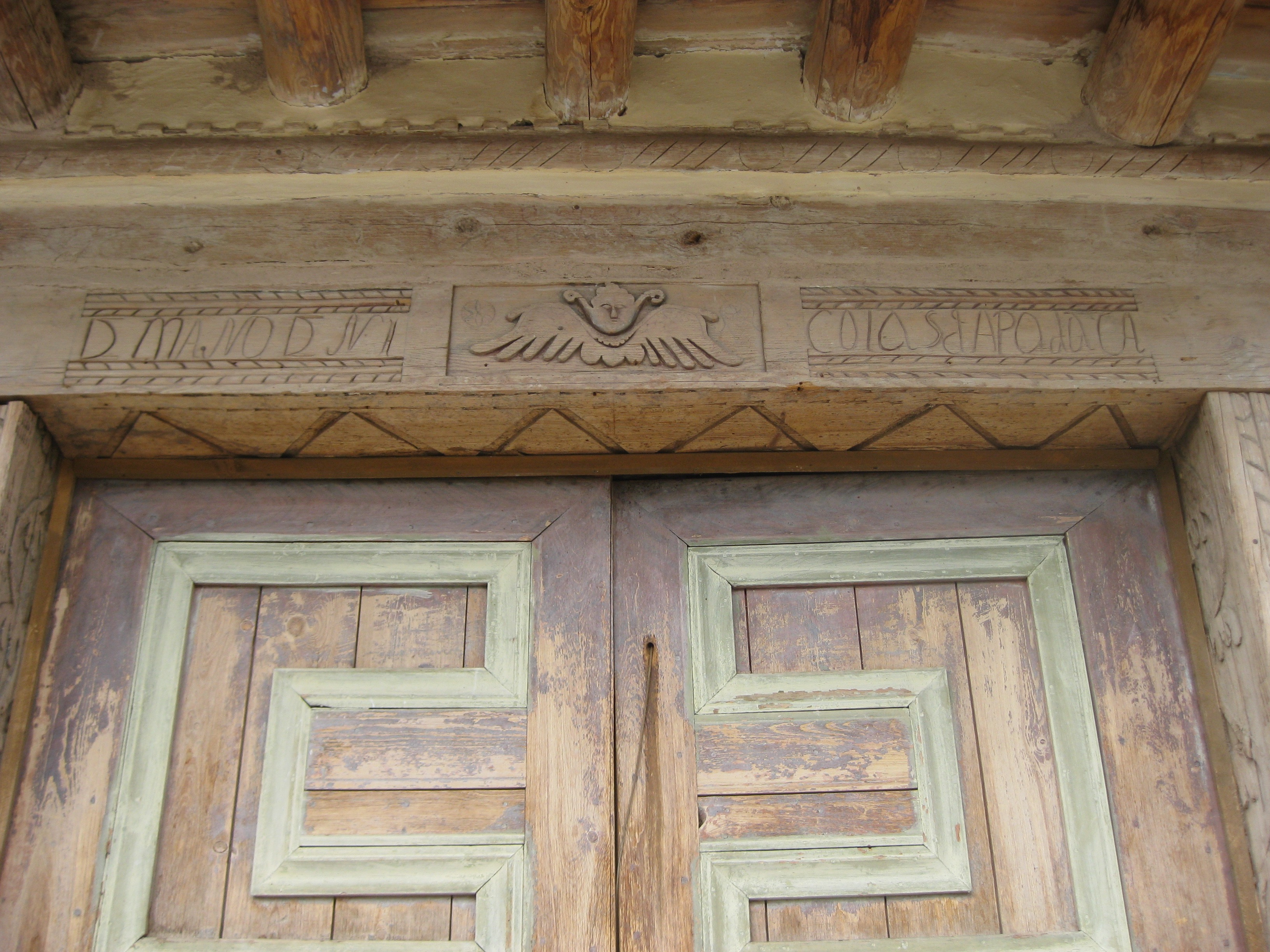
Inscription over front doors by Nicolas Apodaca

== See also ==
- National Register of Historic Places listings in Taos County, New Mexico
- List of National Historic Landmarks in New Mexico
