= Lishui (disambiguation) =

Lishui (丽水市) is a prefecture-level city in Zhejiang, China.

- Liandu District, formerly Lishui County and county-level city; district of Lishui, Zhejiang

Lishui may also refer to:

- Lishui River (澧水), a Yangtze tributary in Hunan
- Lishui District (溧水区), Nanjing, Jiangsu
  - Lishui railway station (Jiangsu) (zh; 溧水站), high-speed railway station on the Nanjing–Hangzhou high-speed railway
  - Lishui station (Nanjing Metro) (溧水站) on Line S7 of the Nanjing Metro in Jiangsu
  - Line S7 (Nanjing Metro), also known as the Lishui Line
- Lishui railway station (Zhejiang) (zh; 丽水站), station on the Jinhua–Wenzhou high-speed railway and conventional Jinhua–Wenzhou railway
- Lishui, Foshan (里水镇), town in Nanhai, Foshan, Guangdong

== See also ==
- Yeosu, South Korea, also written in Hanja as "麗水市"
