= Peñas Blancas =

Coordinates: 37°41′35″S 67°52′12″W

- Municipality and village
- Interactive map of Peñas Blancas
- Country: Argentina
- Province: Río Negro Province
- Time zone: UTC−3 (ART)

Peñas Blancas is a village and municipality in Río Negro Province in Argentina.
