= Sipapu =

Small hole or indentation in the floor of a kiva

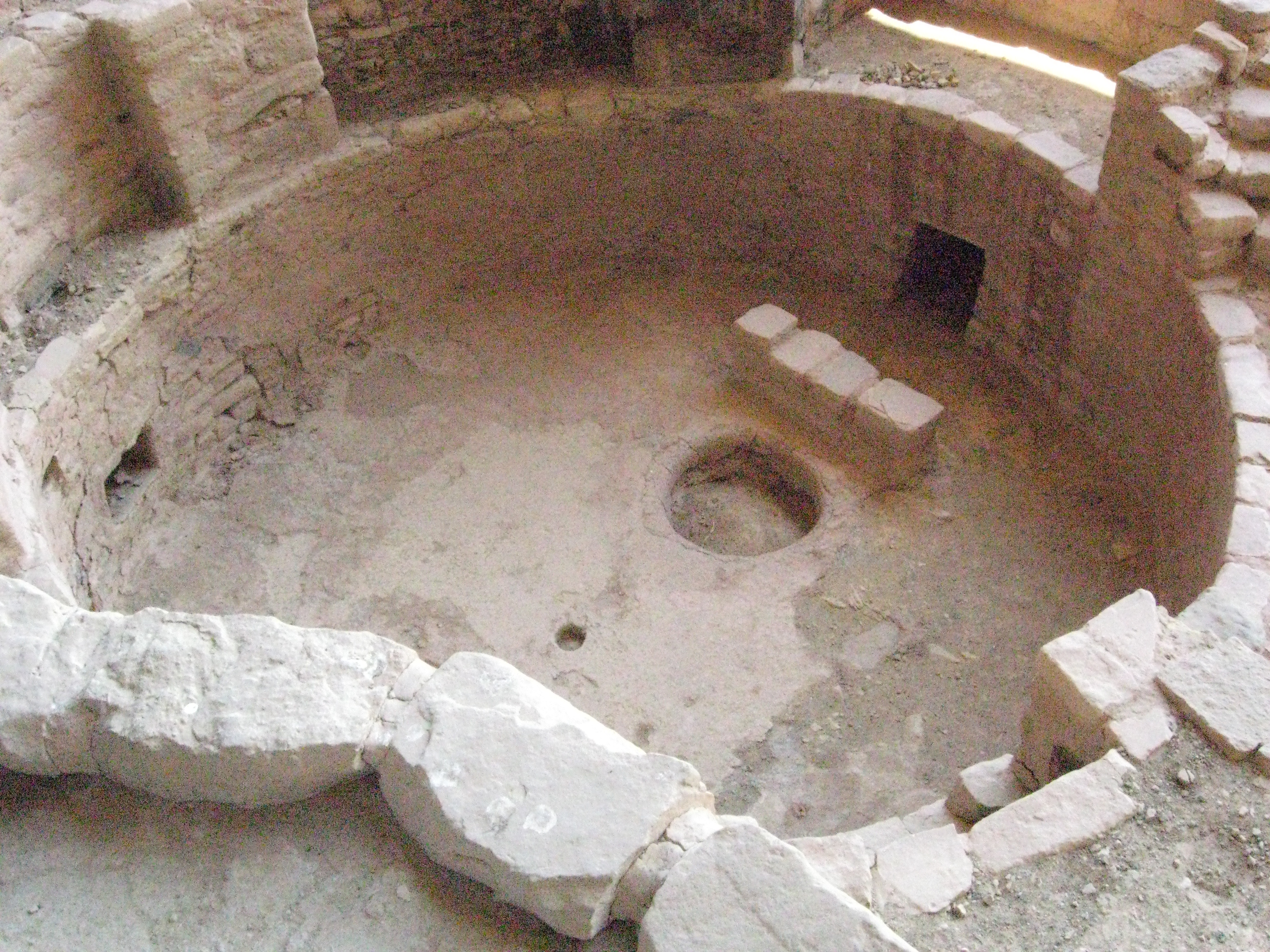
The sipapu is the small round hole in the floor of the kiva. The large round hole is a fire pit. The air intake (square hole), the stones blocking air from the intake, the pit and the sipapu form a line: an intentional design. At Long House, Mesa Verde.

A sipapu (a Hopi word) is a small hole or indentation in the floor of a kiva (pithouse). Kivas were used by the Ancestral Puebloans and continue to be used by modern-day Puebloans. The sipapu symbolizes the portal through which their ancient ancestors first emerged to enter the present world.

Hopi mythology (and similar traditions in other Pueblo cultures such as the Zuni and Acoma) states that this is the hole from which the first peoples of this world entered. As they stepped outside of the sipapu, they changed from lizard-like beings into human form. It is from this point that the "First Peoples" of the Earth began to divide and separate, becoming tribes. The original sipapu is said in Hopi and some other Uto-Aztecan Puebloan mythology to be located in the Grand Canyon.
