= Las Trampas, New Mexico =

Unincorporated community in Rio Arriba County, New Mexico, United States

- Unincorporated community
- Location within the state of New Mexico Location within the United States
- Coordinates: 36°07′52″N 105°45′32″W
- Country: United States
- State: New Mexico
- County: Taos County
- Elevation: 7,428 ft (2,264 m)

Population (2023)
  - Total: 43
- Time zone: UTC-7 (Mountain (MST))
  - Summer (DST): UTC-6 (MDT)
- GNIS feature ID: 911790
- Las Trampas Historic District
- U.S. National Register of Historic Places
- U.S. National Historic Landmark District
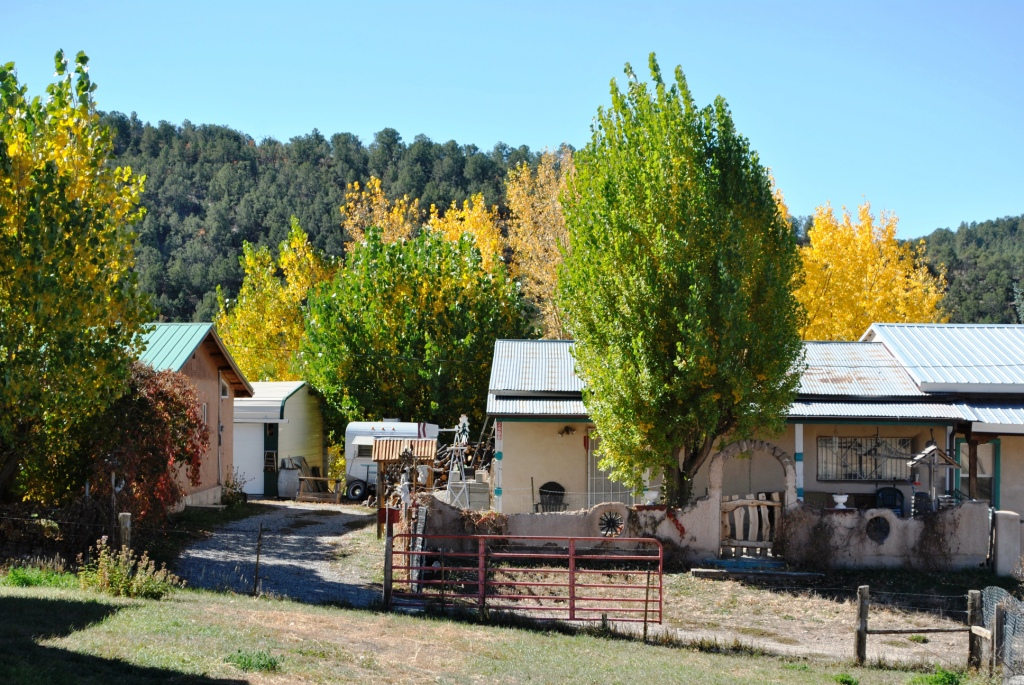
- View of the Las Trampas Historic District.

- Location within New Mexico Location within the United States
- Location: On State Road 76, Las Trampas, New Mexico
- Coordinates: 36°7′57″N 105°45′48″W
- Area: 1,000 acres (400 ha)
- Built: 1850
- Architectural style: Colonial, Spanish Colonial
- NRHP reference No.: 67000007
Significant dates
- Added to NRHP: May 28, 1967
- Designated NHLD: May 28, 1967

Las Trampas or just Trampas (Spanish: "traps"), is an unincorporated hamlet in Taos County, New Mexico. Founded in 1751 to settle the Las Trampas Land Grant, its center retains the original early Spanish colonial defensive layout as well as the 18th-century San José de Gracia Church, one of the finest surviving examples of Spanish colonial church architecture in the United States. The village center was designated a National Historic Landmark District (the Las Trampas Historic District) in 1967. The population in 2023 was 43.

== Geography ==
Las Trampas is located on the scenic High Road to Taos (New Mexico State Road 76) in the Sangre de Cristo Mountains. it is approximately halfway between Santa Fe to the south and Taos to the north. The town has an elevation of 7,440 feet (2,270 m).

Las Trampas has a post office, with the ZIP code 87576; the US Postal Service prefers the name "Trampas". No ZIP Code Tabulation Area information for 87576 is available from Census 2000.

Trampas is located on a relatively flat, narrow, cultivated plain along the Rio de las Trampas, a tributary of the Embudo River. The plain measures about 1.0 mile (1,600 m) in length along the river and about .25 miles (400 m) in width. The plain is surrounded by forest-clad hills and mountains which belong to the Carson National Forest. Two irrigation ditches, called acequias, run parallel to the river from the head to the foot of the valley and deliver water to farmers for crops. A distinctive feature of the acequias is the survival of a "canoa," a hand-hewn hollow log that serves as a flume to transport water across ditches and depressions.

== History ==
In the mid-18th century the population of the Spanish colony of New Mexico, consisting of seven to eight thousand Hispanos and fewer than 10,000 Puebloans (Indians) scattered along the Rio Grande valley, was besieged by Native Americans (Indians) on all sides. New Mexico was in "a state of miserable panic." To protect the colony, the governor of New Mexico authorized the establishment of settlements on its frontiers.

The first settlement at Trampas was a Franciscan mission to the Jicarilla Apache. Founded in 1733, the mission attracted 132 Jicarilla at its peak, but was closed in the 1740s. In 1751, the governor awarded a land grant, later measured to consist of 28,132 acres (11,385 ha), to prospective settlers. Santo Tomas Apostol del Rio de Las Trampas was founded that same year on grant lands by 12 families from Santa Fe. It was the second genízaro settlement (after Belen). The primary purpose of its establishment was to protect the town of Santa Cruz, 27 kilometres (17 mi) southwest, from raids by the Ute, Apache, and, especially, the Comanche. The genízaros were also Indians, but detribalized and with a history of serving as slaves and servants of the Spanish colonists. They were important in the frontier defense of New Mexico. For the genízaros, relocation to Trampas and other frontier settlements was a means of acquiring land. Also among the early settlers were Tlaxcalans, Mexican Indians who had a long history of assisting the Spanish, and mestizos. The settlers of Trampas were armed with spears and bows and arrows; the Comanche were better armed.

By the governor's order, the settlement was fortified with an interior plaza accessible by a single entrance for carts. In times of trouble, the livestock of the settlers was driven into the plaza. The houses of the inhabitants were connected to each other and surrounded the central plaza. The settlement was ringed by a low adobe wall. The village grew despite the danger of attacks by Comanche, and, by 1776, 63 families and 278 inhabitants were residents. The people in that year were described as "a ragged lot...as festive as they [were] poor, and very merry." They spoke "local Spanish" mingled with the Tanoan language of the Taos Pueblo and most spoke some words of the Comanche, Ute, and Apache languages. The village remained isolated, except for travelers on the mountain road, until the 1920s.

Trampas is known for the San José de Gracia Church, built between 1760 and 1776 and considered a model of the adobe colonial Spanish missions in New Mexico.

=== Historic district ===
The Las Trampas Historic Historic District, designated in 1967, encompasses the central village, whose buildings largely follow the plan originally laid out in 1751. Most of the buildings date to the 19th century, often with late 19th-century alterations. The church, a National Historic Landmark for its architecture, is the only surviving 18th-century building. The original defensive wall that surrounded the village has been removed and no significant traces of it remain.

== Gallery ==
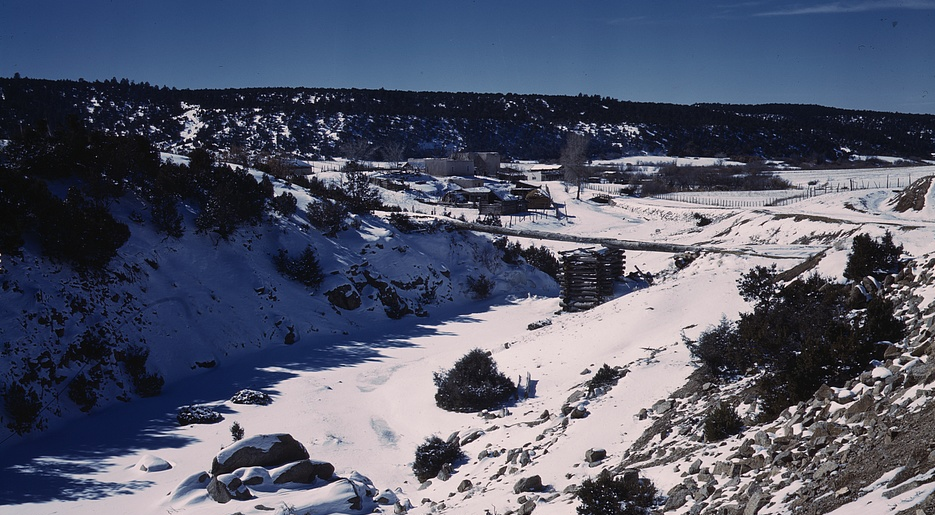
View of Trampas and the Sangre de Cristo Mountains, Spring 1943. The structure crossing a ravine appears to be a canoa, a hand-made flume to transport irrigation water.

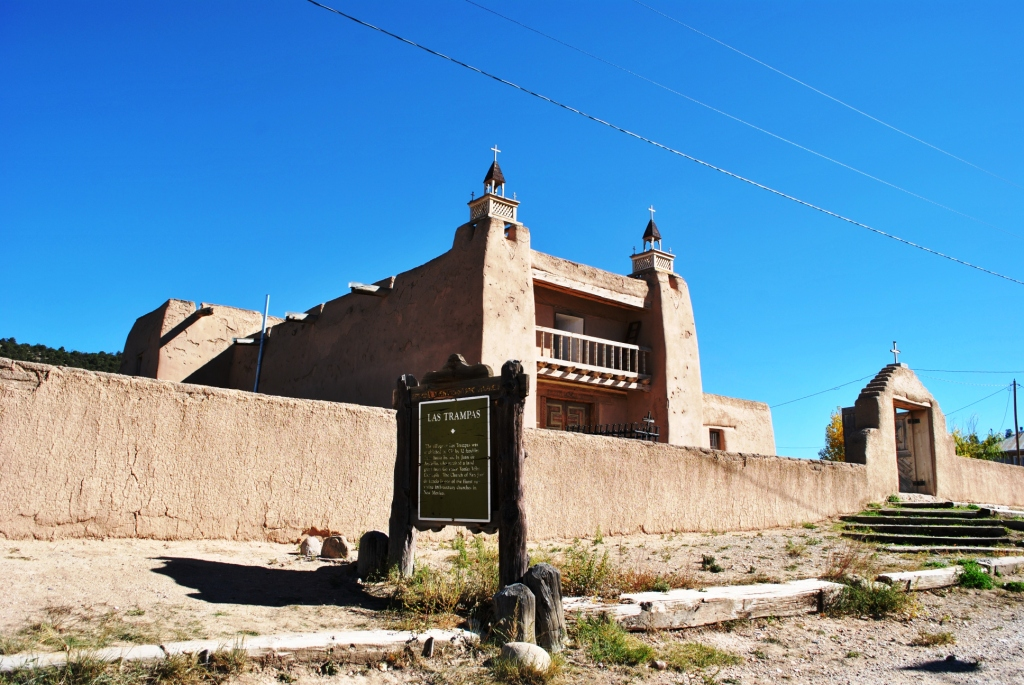
San José de Gracia Church.

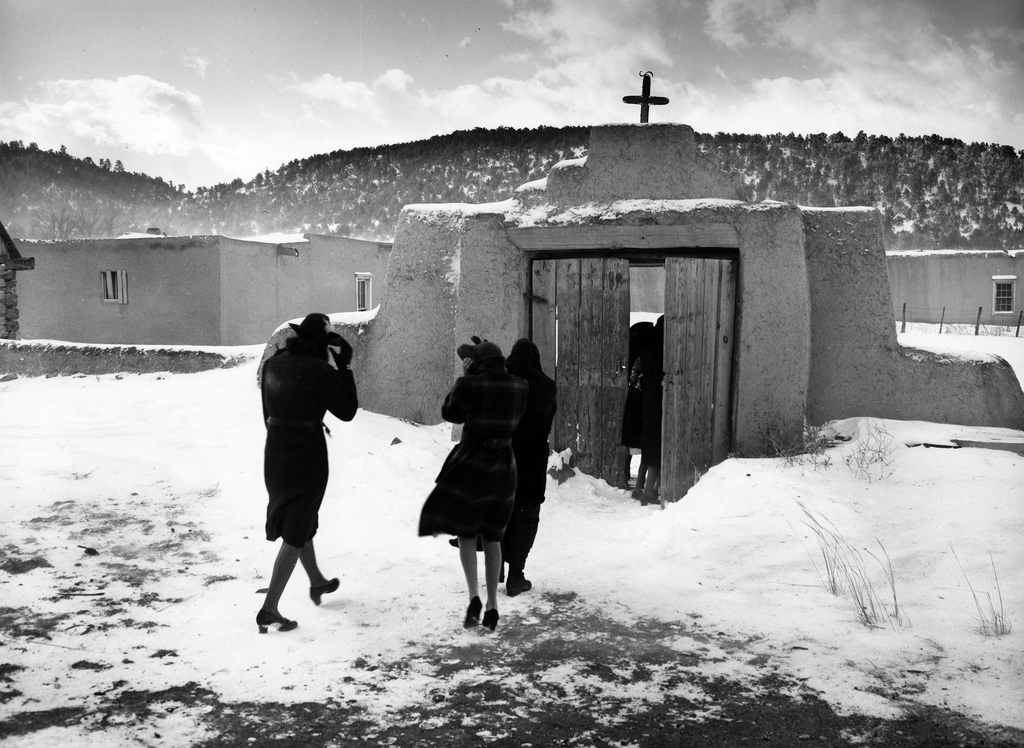
Congregation leaving after services at San José de Gracia Church (1943).

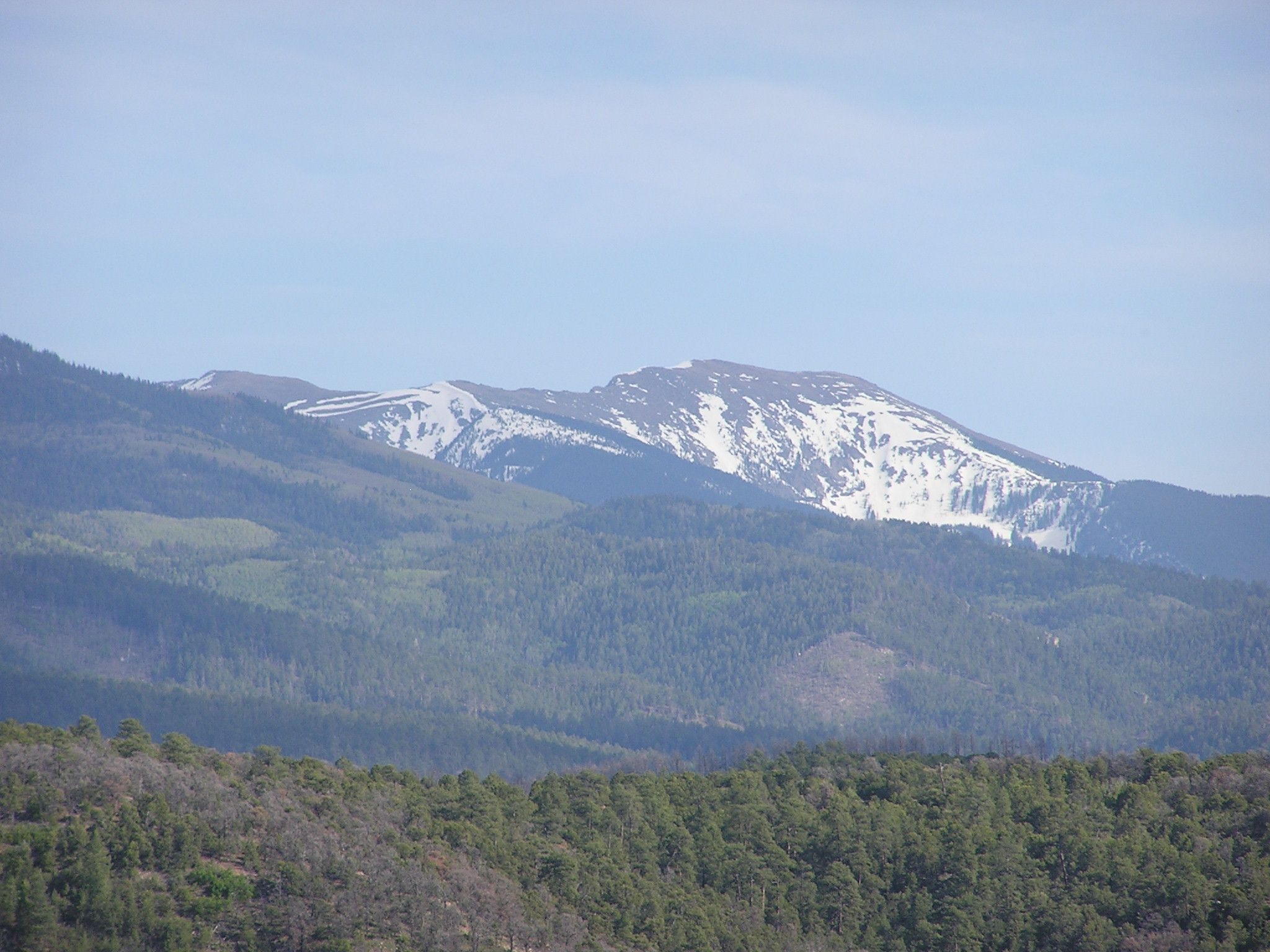
View of Santa Fe Baldy, in the Sangre de Cristo Mountains, from near Las Trampas.

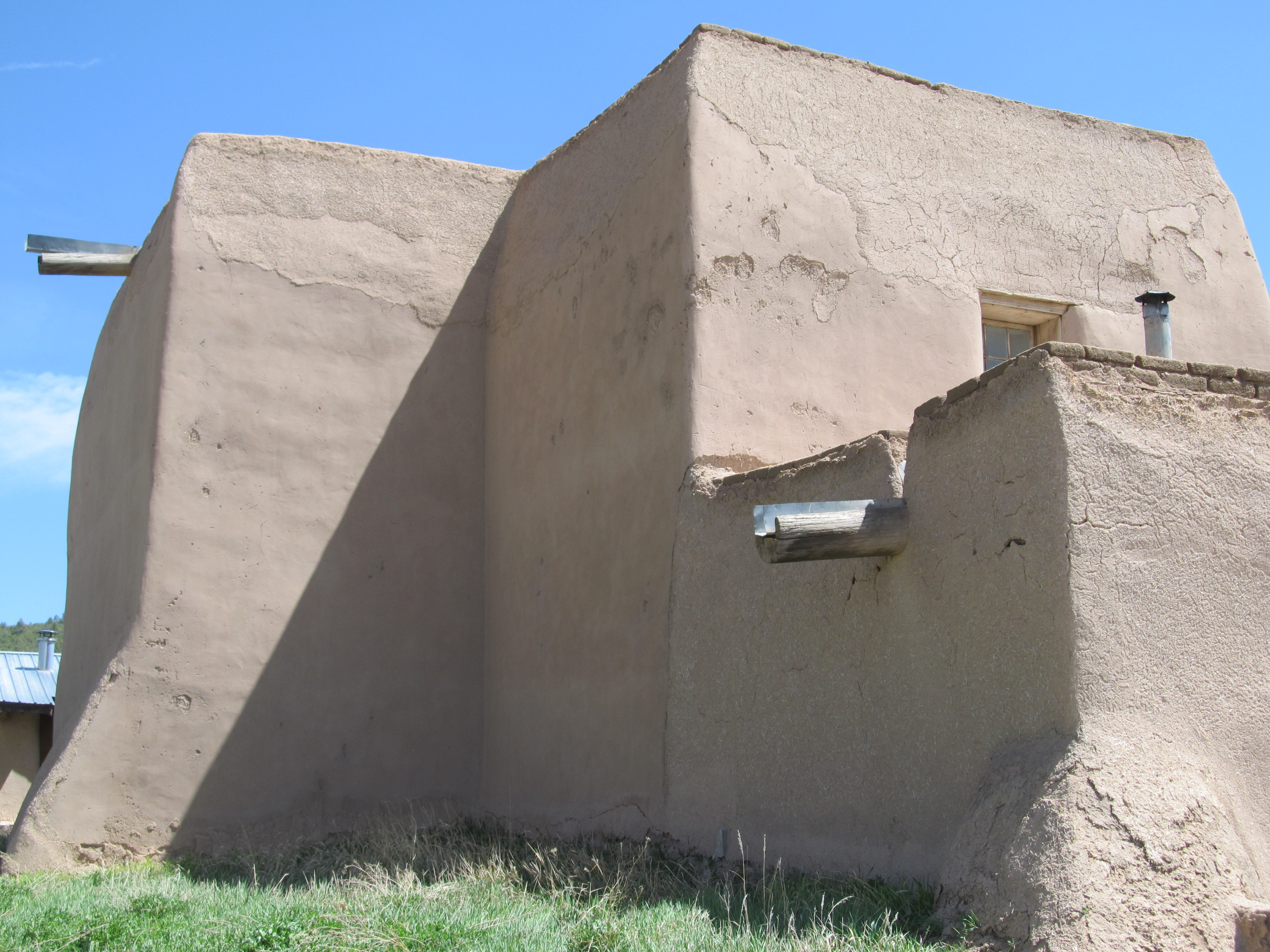
Catholic Church at Las Trampas (north view)

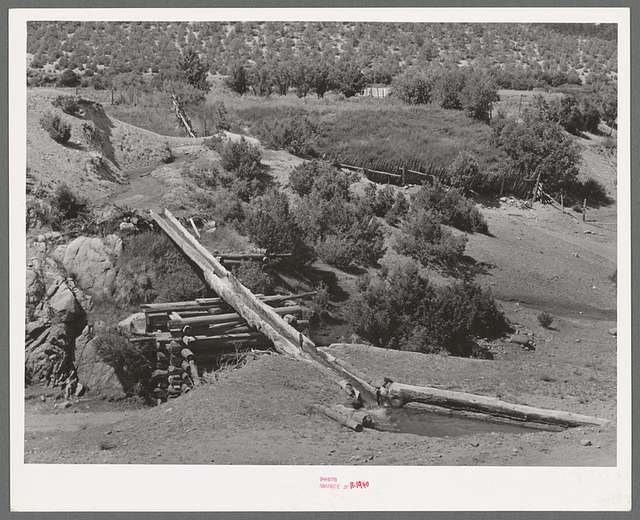
Irrigation water crosses a ditch in a hollowed out log called a canoa. 1930s photo.

== See also ==
- National Register of Historic Places listings in Taos County, New Mexico
- List of National Historic Landmarks in New Mexico
