= La Democracia, Huehuetenango =

La Democracia
- Municipality
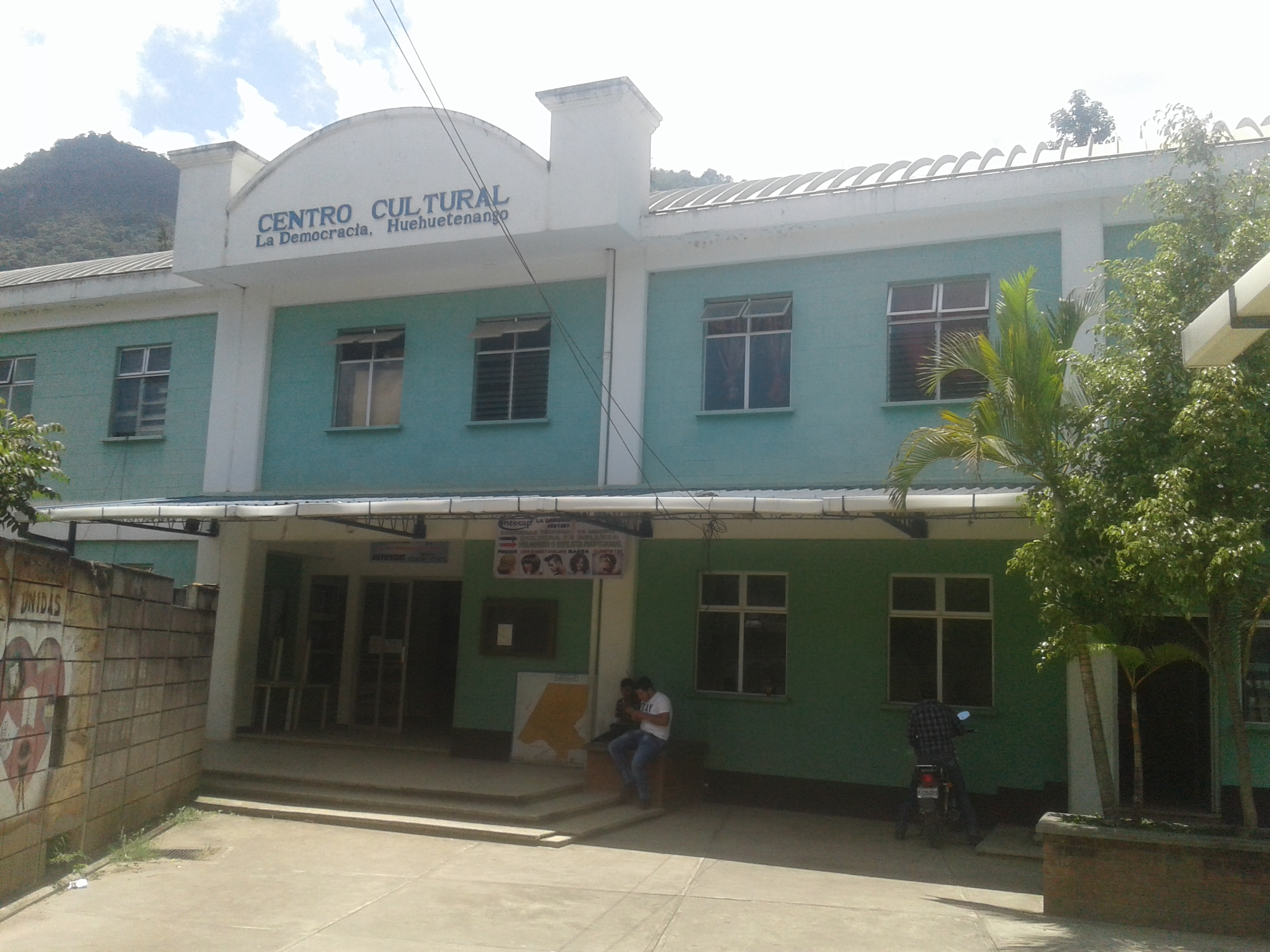
- Cultural Center in La Democracia

- Location in Guatemala
- Coordinates: 15°37′28″N 91°53′17″W
- Country: Guatemala
- Department: Huehuetenango

Government
  - Mayor: Mauro Cobón (UNE)

Area
  - Total: 166 km^{2} (64 sq mi)

Population (2018 census)
  - Total: 55,434
  - Town: 23,146
- Climate: Aw

La Democracia (Spanish pronunciation: [la ðemoˈkɾasja]) is a town, with a population of 23,146 (2018 census), and a municipality in the Guatemalan department of Huehuetenango.
