= List of plazas =

This is a list of public squares, plazas, in Spain and other areas with Spanish heritage.

Europe:
- (Spain) Plaza Mayor, Madrid
- (Spain) Puerta del Sol, Madrid
- (Spain) Plaza de Colón, Madrid
- (Spain) Plaça Sant Jaume, Barcelona
- (Spain) Plaça de Catalunya, Barcelona
- (Spain) Plaza Mayor, Valladolid
- (Spain) Plaza Mayor, Salamanca
- (Spain) Plaza de España, Seville

Asia:

- (Philippines) Plaza de Armas, Intramuros, Manila
- (Philippines) Plaza Dilao, Paco, Manila
- (Philippines) Plaza Lacson, Santa Cruz, Manila
- (Philippines) Plaza Miranda, Quiapo, Manila
- (Philippines) Plaza Moriones, Tondo, Manila
- (Philippines) Plaza Rajah Sulayman, Malate, Manila
- (Philippines) Plaza de Roma, Intramuros, Manila
- (Philippines) Plaza San Lorenzo Ruiz, Binondo, Manila

The Americas:

- (Argentina) Plaza de Mayo, Buenos Aires
- (Argentina) Plaza de la República, Buenos Aires
- (Argentina) Plaza 25 de Mayo, Rosario
- (Bolivia) Plaza Murillo, La Paz
- Zócalo (Plaza de la Constitución), Mexico City
- (Mexico) Macroplaza, Monterrey
- (Mexico) Plaza de la Paz, Guanajuato, Guanajuato
- (Peru) Plaza Mayor, Lima
- (United States) Los Angeles Plaza
- (United States) Plaza de la Constitución, St. Augustine, Florida
- (United States) Santa Fe Plaza
- (United States) Albuquerque Plaza
- (United States) Ranchos de Taos Plaza
- (Uruguay) Plaza Independencia, Montevideo
- (Ecuador) Plaza de la Independencia, Quito
- (Colombia) Plaza de Bolívar, Bogotá
- (Puerto Rico) Plaza Colón, Mayagüez
