= Ned Scott =

American photographer (1907–1964)

- Born: April 16, 1907
- Died: November 24, 1964 (aged 57)
- Occupation: Photographer
- Spouse: Gwladys Matthews (m. 1936)
- Children: 2

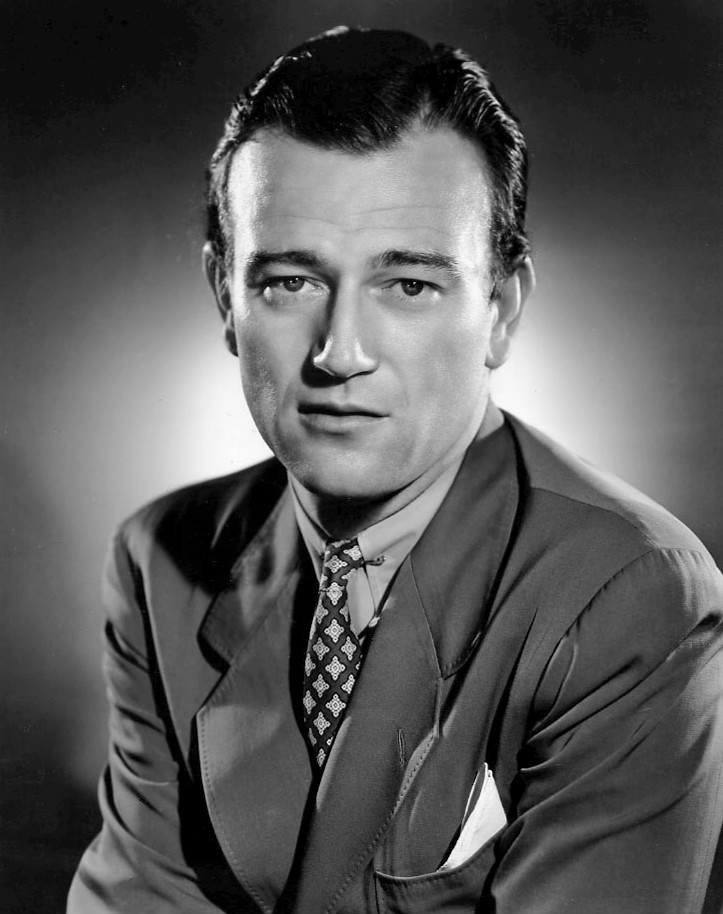
John Wayne (1940)

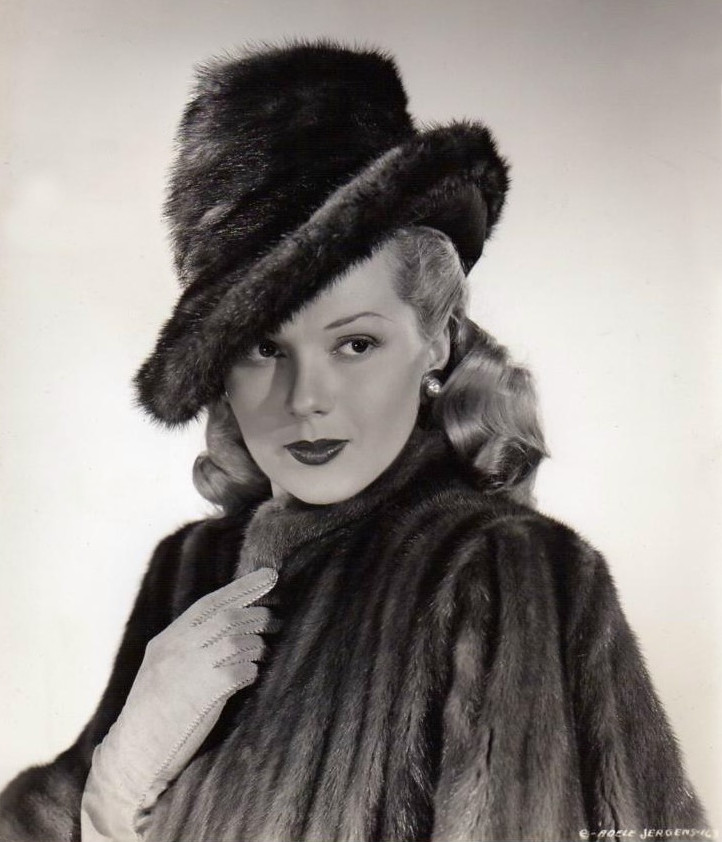
Adele Jergens (1945)

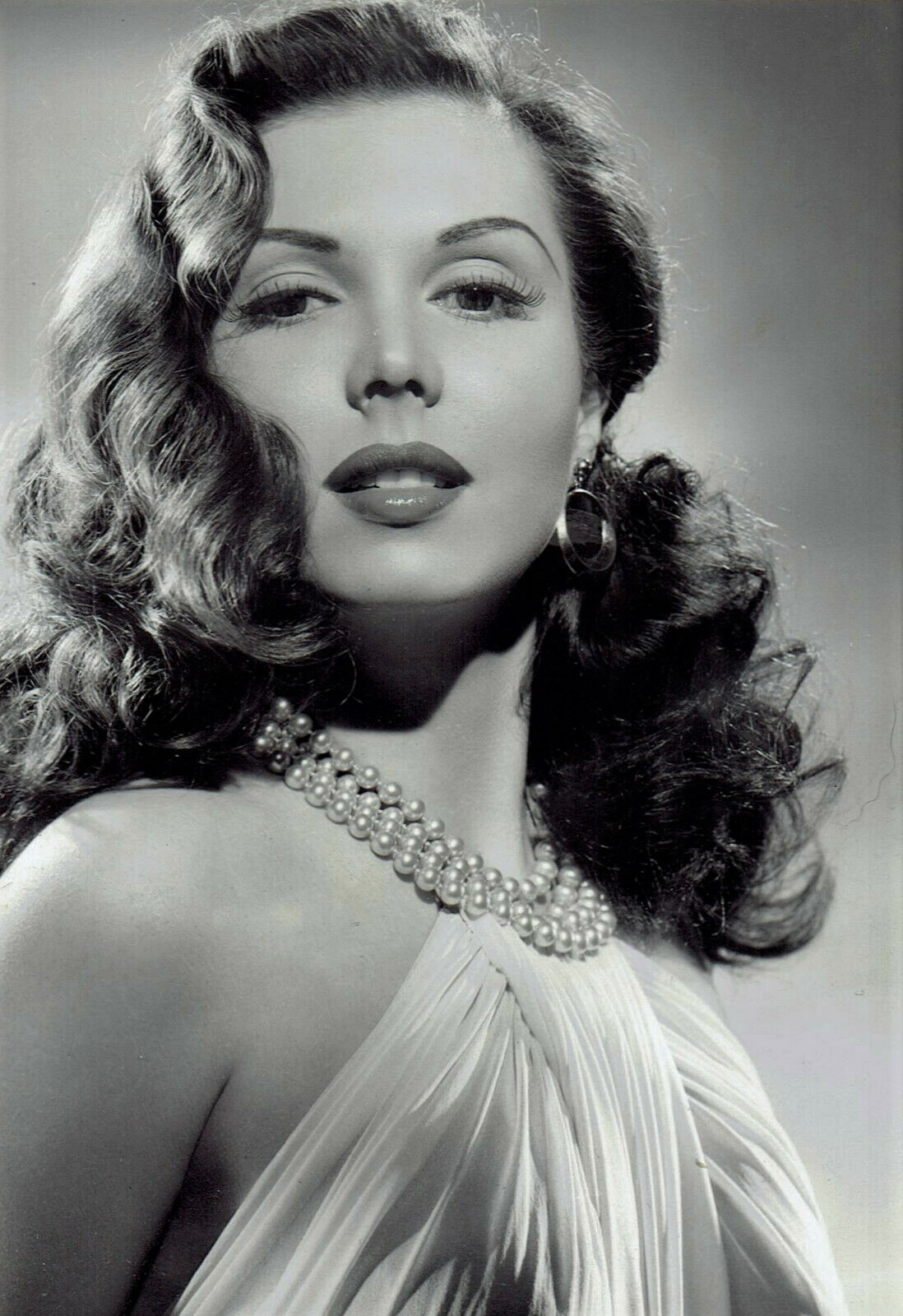
Ann Miller (1946)

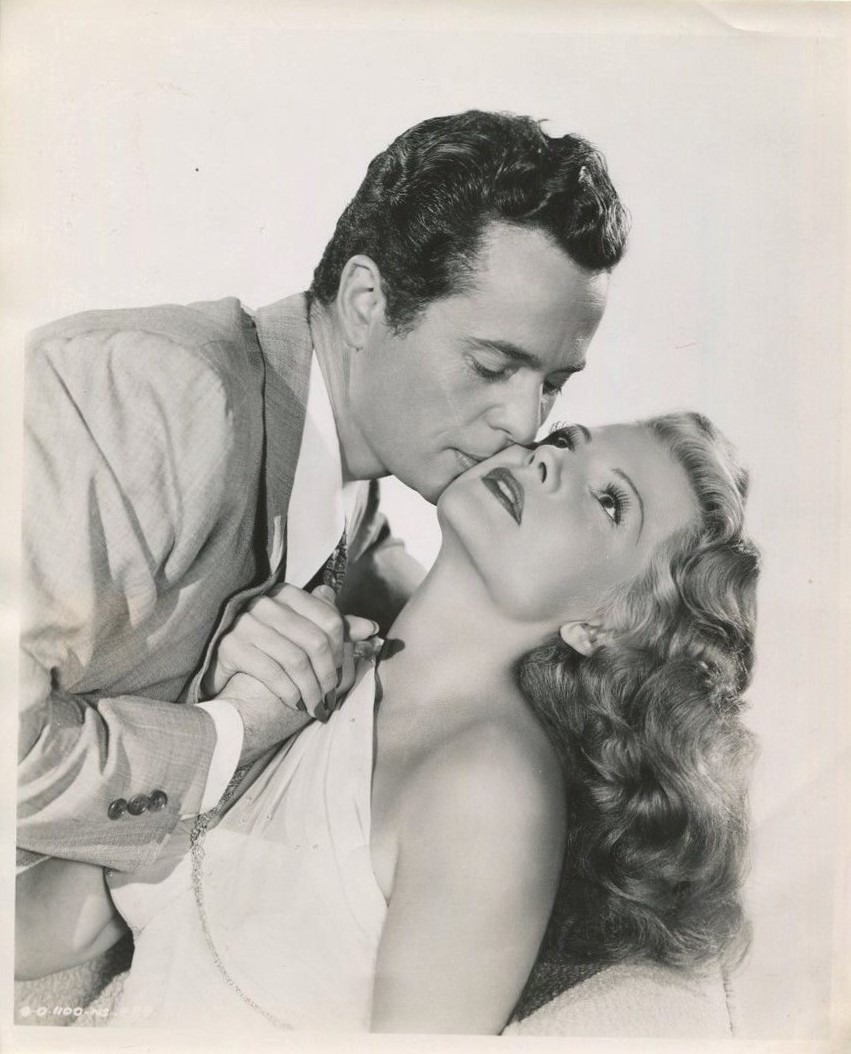
Rita Hayworth and Larry Parks (1947)

Ned Scott (April 16, 1907 – November 24, 1964) was an American photographer who worked in the Hollywood film industry as a still photographer from 1935 to 1948. As a member of The Camera Club of New York from 1930 to 1934, he was heavily influenced by fellow members Paul Strand and Henwar Rodakiewicz.

== Early commercial work ==
While living in New York and visiting the Camera Club, Ned Scott began commercial work with still-lifes and x-ray tubes. He experimented with light and form during this period. Unfortunately, little survives, except that which he saved for his own personal collection. His other photographic efforts during this time included a study of La Iglesia de San Francisco in Ranchos de Taos, New Mexico.

== Mexico ==
Scott spent the latter half of 1934 working for Paul Strand on location in Alvarado, Mexico to produce the Mexican funded propaganda film, Redes. Fred Zinnemann, who also worked on this film in his directorial debut, referred to Scott's stills as "classics" in his autobiography.

His assignment was the creation of film stills during the production of the film. He used a 5 x 7 Graflex camera throughout production. He masked the back plate of the camera to a 5 x 6 size at the suggestion of Paul Strand, thus producing exposed film which was a little smaller than usual. Because the sun was so intense at the midday period, filming of Redes took place in the early morning and late afternoon. Zinnemann made this filming schedule due to the fact that most of the participants wore large straw hats, characteristic of the culture and area, and these hats created very dark shadows over the actors' facial features. So it was, that during this midday time, Scott had the opportunity to make photographic forays into the community of Alvarado to document the town. He also used this time to make character portraits.

Two months following Strand's return to the US from Mexico, he referred to these stills as "the finest set of still photographs I have ever seen for any film".

Conditions in Alvarado were spartan, and travel took time. Crossing the Mexican border was problematic because of sensitivities of the Mexican government to immigrant labor, often causing delays of days for telegrams to be transmitted back and forth with officials in the government. Overall Alvarado was a very shabby place. There was dirt everywhere. Facial qualities of the local population were strong, perhaps due to the African American genetic strain within the group but there was "an appalling amount of toothlessness". Known as Jarochos, members of the local population laughed, sang and drank (aguardiente) as a normal course of things. Throughout Mexico Alvarado was known as the most foul-mouthed village anywhere. Despite the local color, both Strand and Rodakiewicz found the town and its people terribly depressing. Underlying this feature, however, was a vitality and a specialness which lent possibilities for a good film. But at the end of 1933, when Henwar arrived to assist in the film's production, he found the scenario ragged and incoherent.

Scott arrived in Alvarado in June 1934. Zinnemann was already there, having arrived in January at the request of Henwar to take over the role of film director after Henwar left to complete a prior commitment on a Stirner film about American Pueblo Indians. Prior to his departure, Henwar had also completed the shooting script for Strand because he did not feel right about leaving Strand alone in the production of the film. There was no one else on hand in Alvarado who grasped the enormous possibilities of cinema or who knew anything about making a film. By June, the production team was finally assembled, Henwar having returned from the Pueblo job, and filming could commence. Scott began his first film still assignment with a rookie director, a rookie producer and a group of rookie actors in a foreign town whose inhabitants were renowned for their drinking and swearing. And he worked for free.

Gunther von Fritsch, the editor of the film, arrived and joined the film crew on October 26, 1934. He was enchanted with the town (he landed in Alvarado during a lengthy fiesta with dancing in the plaza and fireworks every night). His work began immediately, but there were problems. Equipment on hand was primitive as there were no light boxes, cutting tables or bins to organize the film trims, and much had to be improvised. Electricity was unreliable, and when available, it was fluctuating, causing the moviola and projector to run at erratic speeds, a circumstance which hampered timing. Gunther got as much done as he could in Alvarado, then went to Mexico City on November 2 to record the musical score.

== Hollywood years ==
Scott arrived in Hollywood in February 1935 and took up residence with Zinnemann, Rodakiewicz and von Fritsch in a studio apartment complex at 7900 Honey Drive, North Hollywood. With his New York experience and recently finished film effort in Mexico, Scott began free lance work as a still photographer. He was soon to come to the notice of producers David Loew, Walter Wanger and Lester Cowan for whom he photographed films in the latter half of the 1930s and early 1940s. Most notable are the two Walter Wanger films Stagecoach (1939) and The Long Voyage Home (1941). Both of these films were directed by John Ford. Some of his most recognizable work was yet to be created, however. In March 1945, he signed a contract to perform still and portrait photography with Columbia Pictures, becoming a contract employee for the first time since entering Hollywood. Over the next three years Scott worked with such stars as Rita Hayworth, Glenn Ford, Humphrey Bogart, and Janet Blair. Salary was structured at $250 per week beginning the first year, then rising to $300 per week for the second year, and $350.00 per week for the last year. This period was his most prolific during which he shot 50,000 frames a year.

Scott was recognized for the quality of his photography. Even though he had no formal, institutional training in photography prior to beginning his Hollywood career, Scott soon found his still photographs published in books and nationally circulated periodicals. The Academy of Motion Picture Arts and Sciences honored him with an 11 x 14 display of his character study image of Barry Fitzgerald as "Cocky" from The Long Voyage Home. This exhibit was billed as a "Hollywood Studios Still Photography Show" featuring "Stars in Camera Art" in Fall of 1940. In the February 19 issue of Look Magazine, the editors honored him with a Photo of the Year award in 1946. The image which won him this award arose from his work for the film Tars and Spars.

A key method utilized to capture the most convincing portraits of actors in character was the "swing to" shot. Facing away from an 8 x 10 camera lens, the actor spoke lines as though on the sound stage with cameras running. All the incipient force of the actor's character emerged as the lines from the script were uttered. Then, without hesitation, the actor rotated to face the camera, giving Scott the perfect portrayal of the screen character.

== Later commercial work ==
While awaiting film assignments, Scott filled his spare time with commercial work. His chief client was the Gantner & Mattern Co. of San Francisco, manufacturer of swim wear, sports wear and sweaters. His association with the clothing company lasted from 1937 through 1942 and consisted of creating photographs showcasing their products in realistic settings using both male and female models. Gantner and Mattern produced advertising products using these photographs, and national ads were placed in Vogue, Mademoiselle and Life magazines. Of particular note was their most popular line of male swimwear called WIKIES (no relation to this platform) which figured prominently in Scott's photography of male models.

== Auctions ==
Since Scott never printed for the market, few of his personal prints can be found for sale. Most of the material in the auction circuit is from his Hollywood years, and these items are "publicity stills," 8 x 10 prints on single-weight glossy photographic paper. Much more significant are the few auctions of his vintage personal prints which have occurred in the last 15 years. Notable here are two Redes platinum prints which Sotheby's auctioned in 1999, one platinum originating from Clara B. DeMille, and 43 original Redes prints from the Gunther von Fritsch estate.

== Exhibits ==
Augustin Chavez curated an exhibit at the Palace of Fine Arts in Mexico City in 1980–81, and this exhibit included prints from Paul Strand and prints from Ned Scott negatives generated during the 1934 Redes experience. Chavez borrowed 86 Redes negatives from Scott's widow in summer of 1979 for this exhibit and made exhibit prints from these negs for the Palace display.

The Cowboy and Western Heritage Museum in Oklahoma City mounted an exhibit detailing the production of the movie Stagecoach in 2003. Included in this exhibit were 22 display prints generated from Scott's personal print collection which he saved from his own work on the film. Also included in this exhibit were a number of artifacts and ephemera from the film's creation. The New York Times heralded this exhibit with a detailed article on March 3, 2003. Actress and cast member Louise Platt wrote a lengthy letter to the Ned Scott Archive in support of this exhibit. She recalled her own experiences as a member of the cast, and she discussed her observations and feelings toward other cast members including Claire Trevor and John Wayne and director John Ford. Excerpts from the letter were posted for all to see.

== Family ==
Ned Scott married Gwladys Matthews, daughter of Presbyterian minister Reverend Mark A. Matthews of Seattle, in 1936. Gwladys's first marriage, to the French writer Maurice Sachs ended in divorce in 1934. Ned and Gwladys lived for four years on Mesa Drive in Santa Monica Canyon, California and then moved to La Cañada where he raised a family including one daughter and son.

== Works ==
- Scott, Ned (June 20, 1943). "Still Photography in the Motion Picture Industry". The Complete Photographer Magazine: 88–96.
