= San Francisco de Asís Mission Church =

Historic church in New Mexico, United States

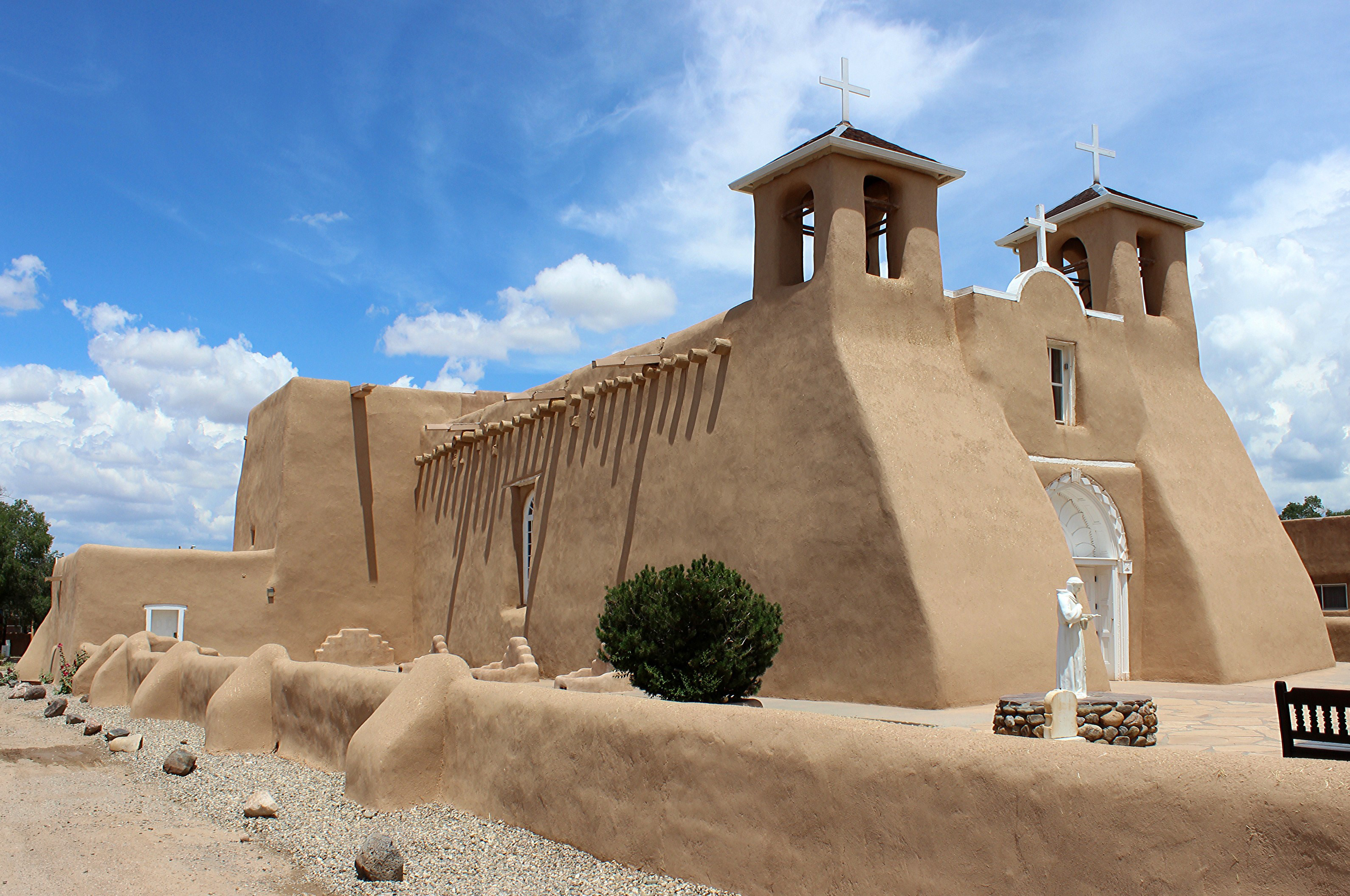
- Mission Church of Ranchos de Taos

- Location within New Mexico

Religion
- Affiliation: Roman Catholic; Franciscans

Location
- Location: The Plaza of Ranchos de Taos, New Mexico; USA
- Coordinates: 36.35851388888889°N 105.60841388888889°W

Architecture
- Architect: Built by The Franciscan Fathers
- Style: Adobe, Spanish Colonial
- Completed: 1772
- Materials: Adobe Terra Colorado Exterior. Adobe brick laid up in adobe mortar with adobe plaster surface.

U.S. National Historic Landmark
- Added to NRHP: April 15, 1970
- NRHP Reference no.: 70000416
- Designated as NHL: April 15, 1970
- Type: Contributing property
- Designated: October 2, 1978
- Parent listing: Ranchos de Taos Plaza
- Reference no.: 78001830

Website
- www.sfranchos.org

San Francisco de Asís Parish Church is an historic and architecturally significant Catholic church in Ranchos de Taos, New Mexico in the Archdiocese of Santa Fe. During the 18th century, it was the center of a small Spanish and Native American agricultural community. The current church was constructed between 1772 and 1816.

San Francisco de Asís is an example of a New Mexico Spanish Colonial Church, and is a popular subject for artists. It was designated a National Historic Landmark in 1970.

== Description ==
San Francisco de Asís is located about 4 miles (6.4 km) south of Taos, New Mexico, at the center of the main plaza in the unincorporated community of Ranchos de Taos . It is approximately 120 feet (37 m) in length, with a cruciform plan.

An adobe wall extends from the back of the church and one of the transepts to form an enclosed rectangular area on the building's south side. Adobe buttresses project from several portions of the main walls, including architecturally distinctive beehive-curved buttresses at the ends of the transepts. The roof is formed out of adobe laid on planking supported by timber vigas, set in distinctive doubly corbelled mounts. The vigas are also more closely spaced than is typically found in other examples of Spanish colonial architecture. The entrance is flanked by a pair of bell towers.

== History ==
San Francisco de Asís was established in the early 18th century. Initial construction began around 1772 and was completed in 1815 by the Franciscan order; its patron is Saint Francis of Assisi. The church was the center of the fortified plaza, which provided it protection against Comanche attacks. San Francisco de Asís has undergone several restorations or subsequent works in 1850, 1916 and 1933.

In 1967, the archdiocese replaced the roof and the ceiling beams (vigas). It also installed replicas of the original corbels. The doors were also replaced with copies of the original design. The original sanctuary woodwork was left intact. The community and parishioners gather annually to earthen plaster the church.

== Representation ==
San Francisco de Asís was the subject of several paintings by Georgia O'Keeffe and photographs by Ansel Adams, Paul Strand and Ned Scott. O'Keeffe described it as "one of the most beautiful buildings left in the United States by the early Spaniards."

The Taos Chamber of Commerce states that San Francisco de Asís is "one of the most photographed and painted churches in the world".

The church was designated a National Historic Landmark in 1970. It is also designated as a World Heritage church.

== Historic photographs ==
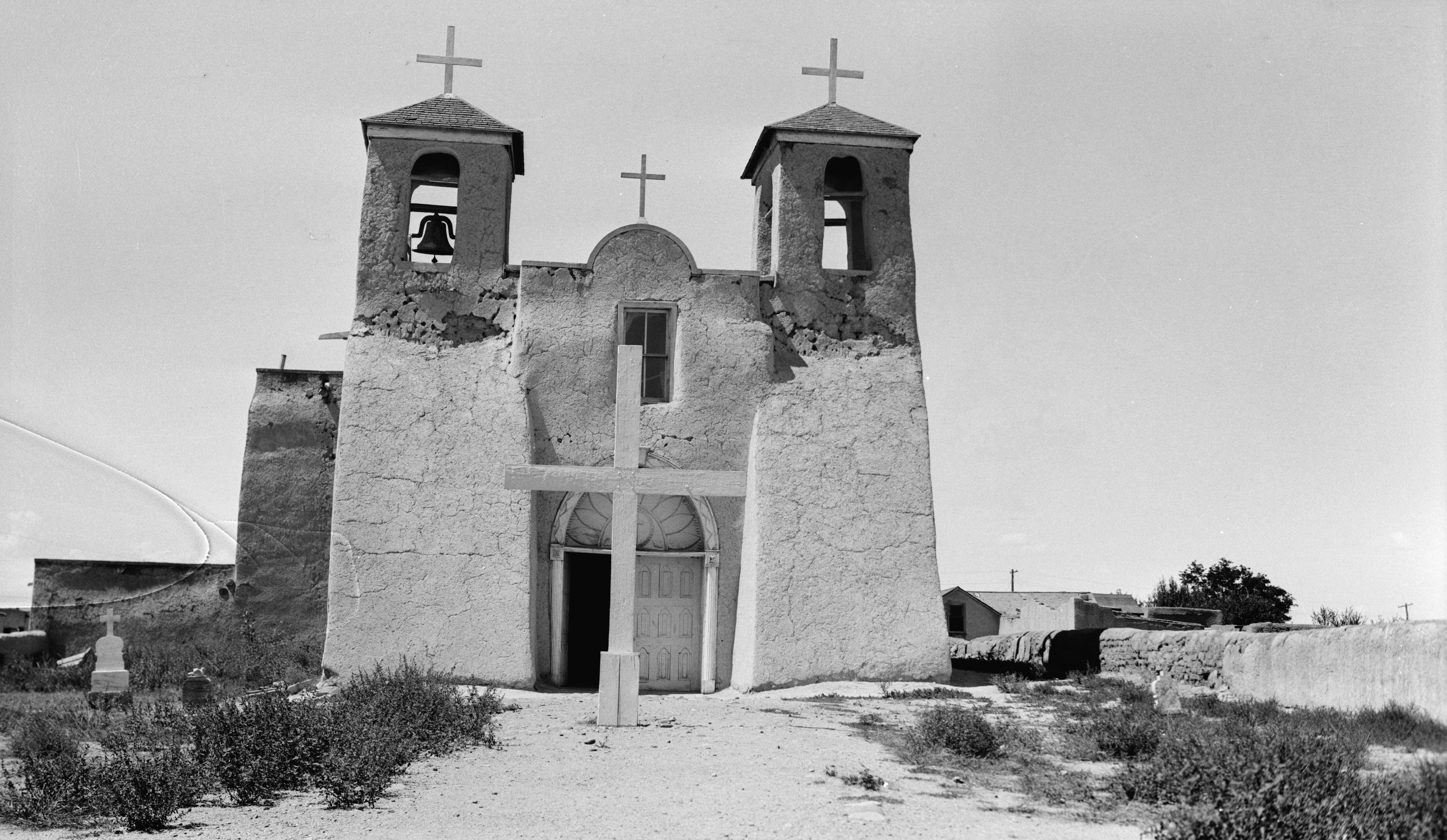
Southern view (1936)

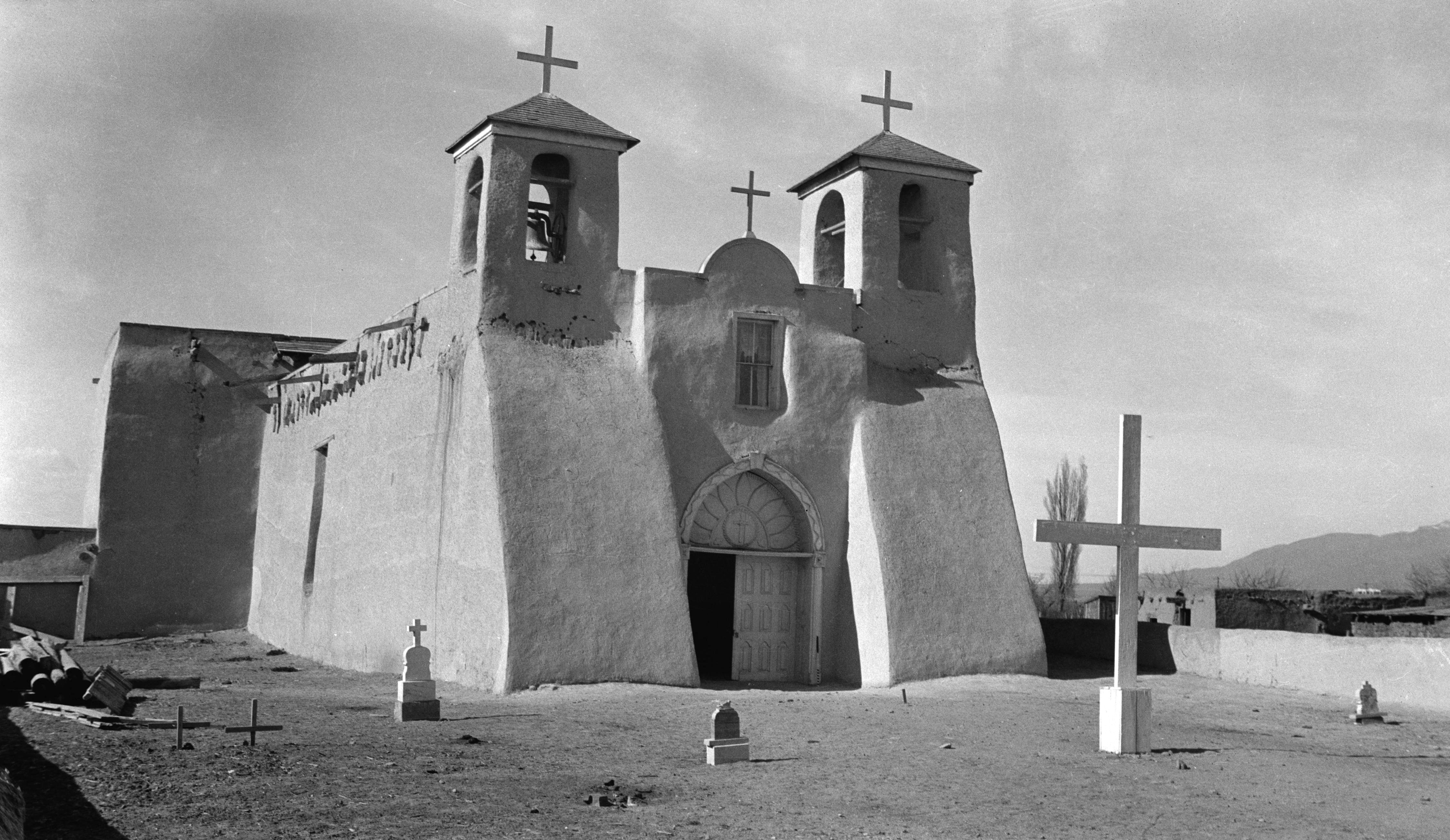
Eastern view (1934)

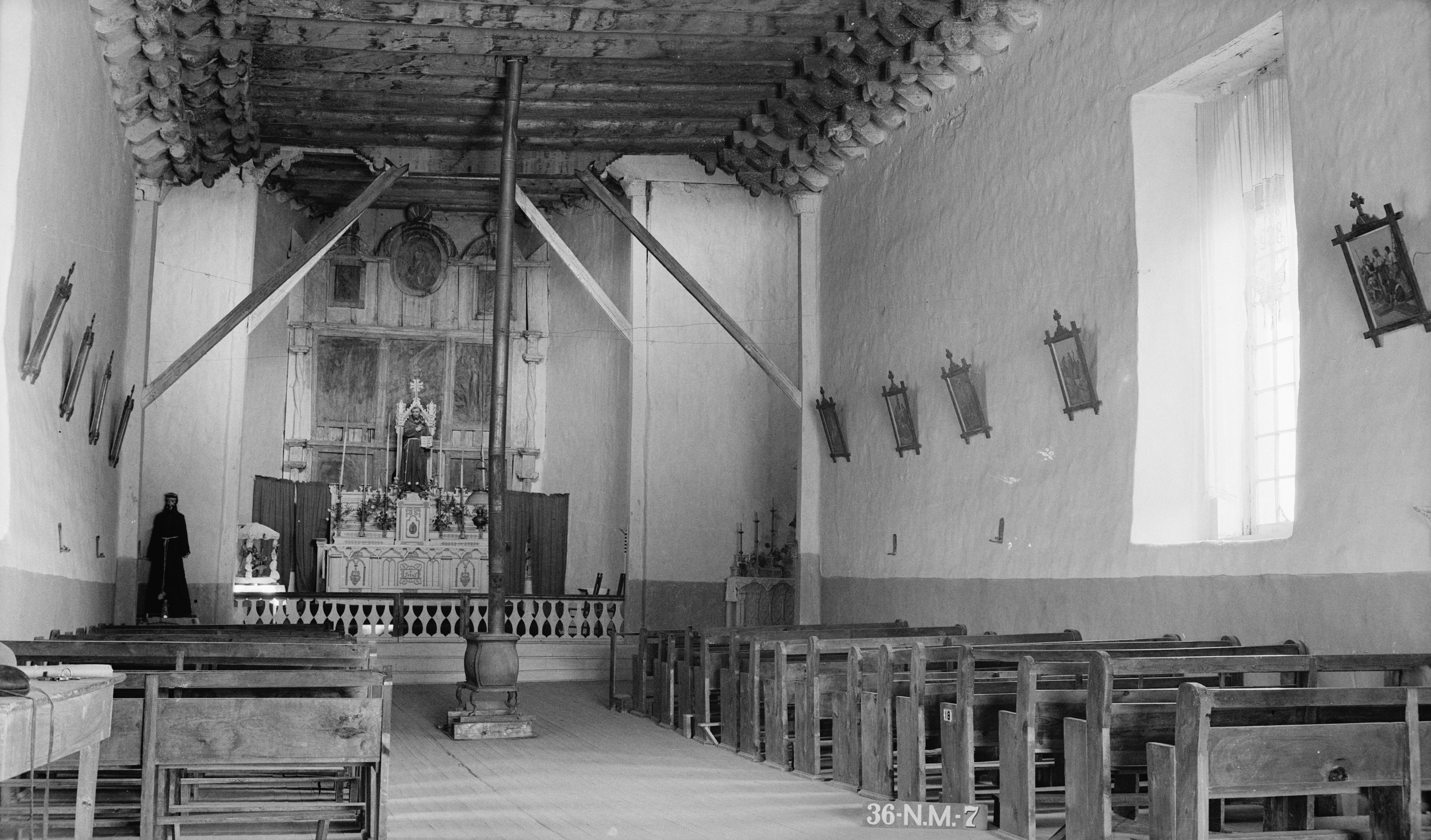
Interior nave, western view (1934)

== Gallery ==
Grade buttress

North east bell tower

North east transept apse

South west nave window

Transept sacristy
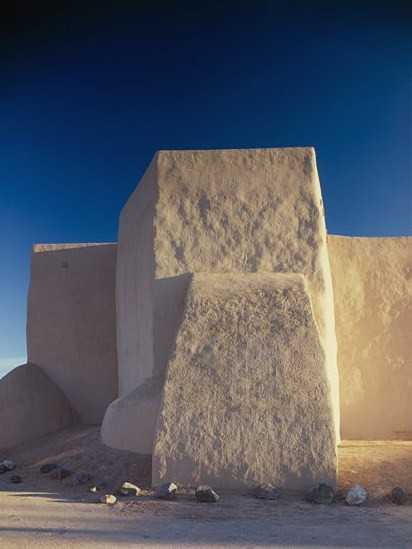
South facade

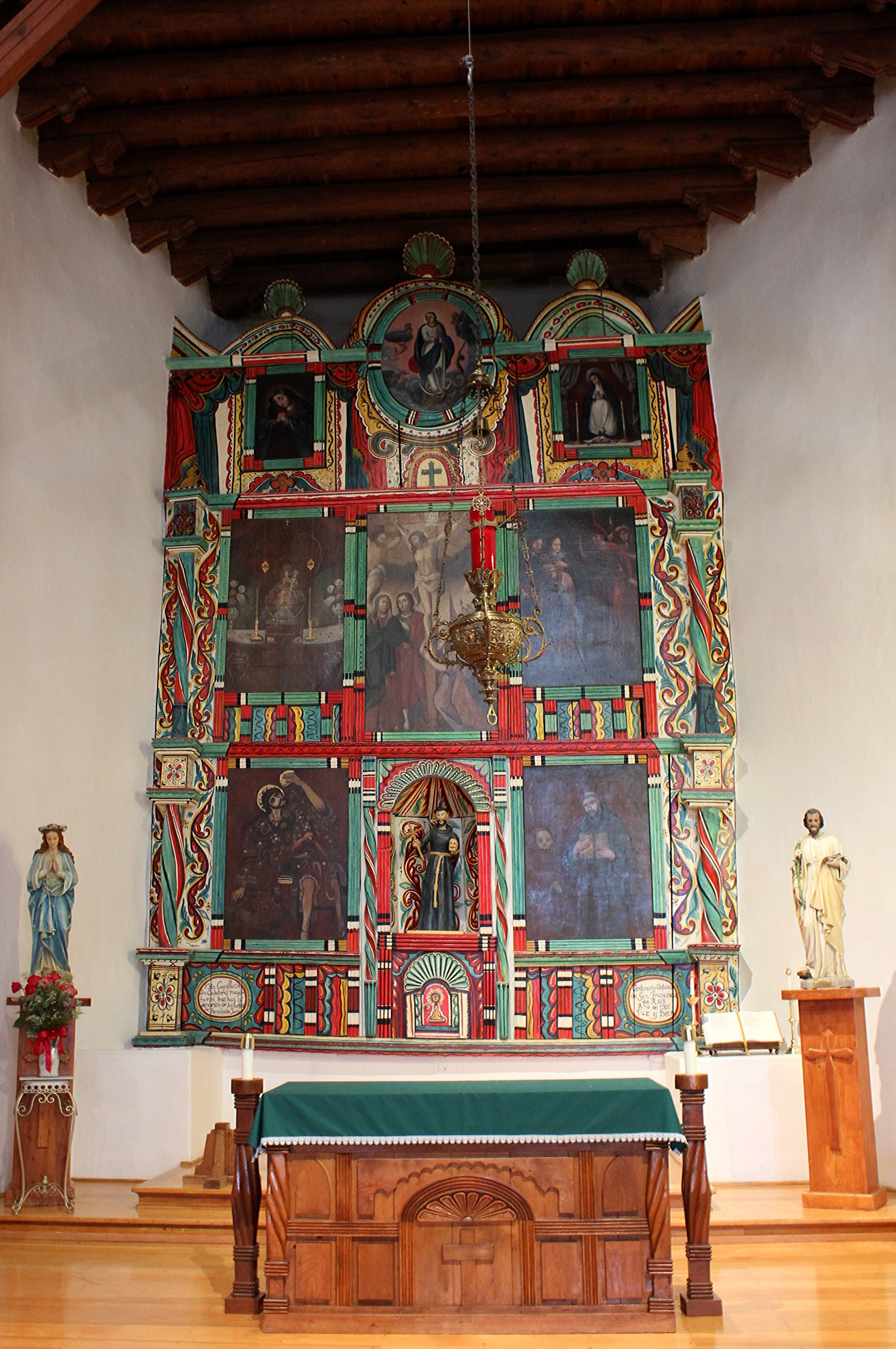
Altarpiece (restored 1981)

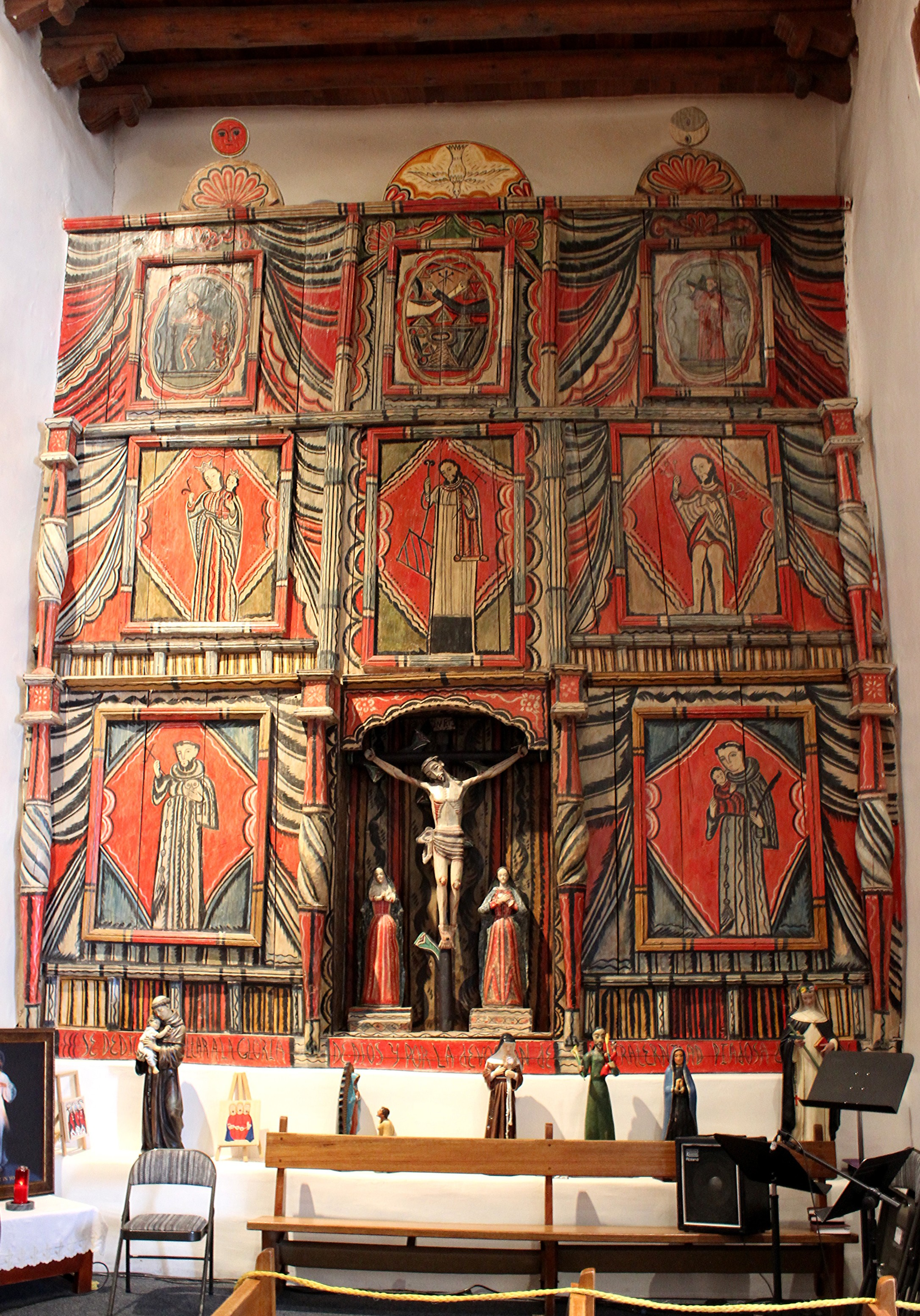
Altarpiece

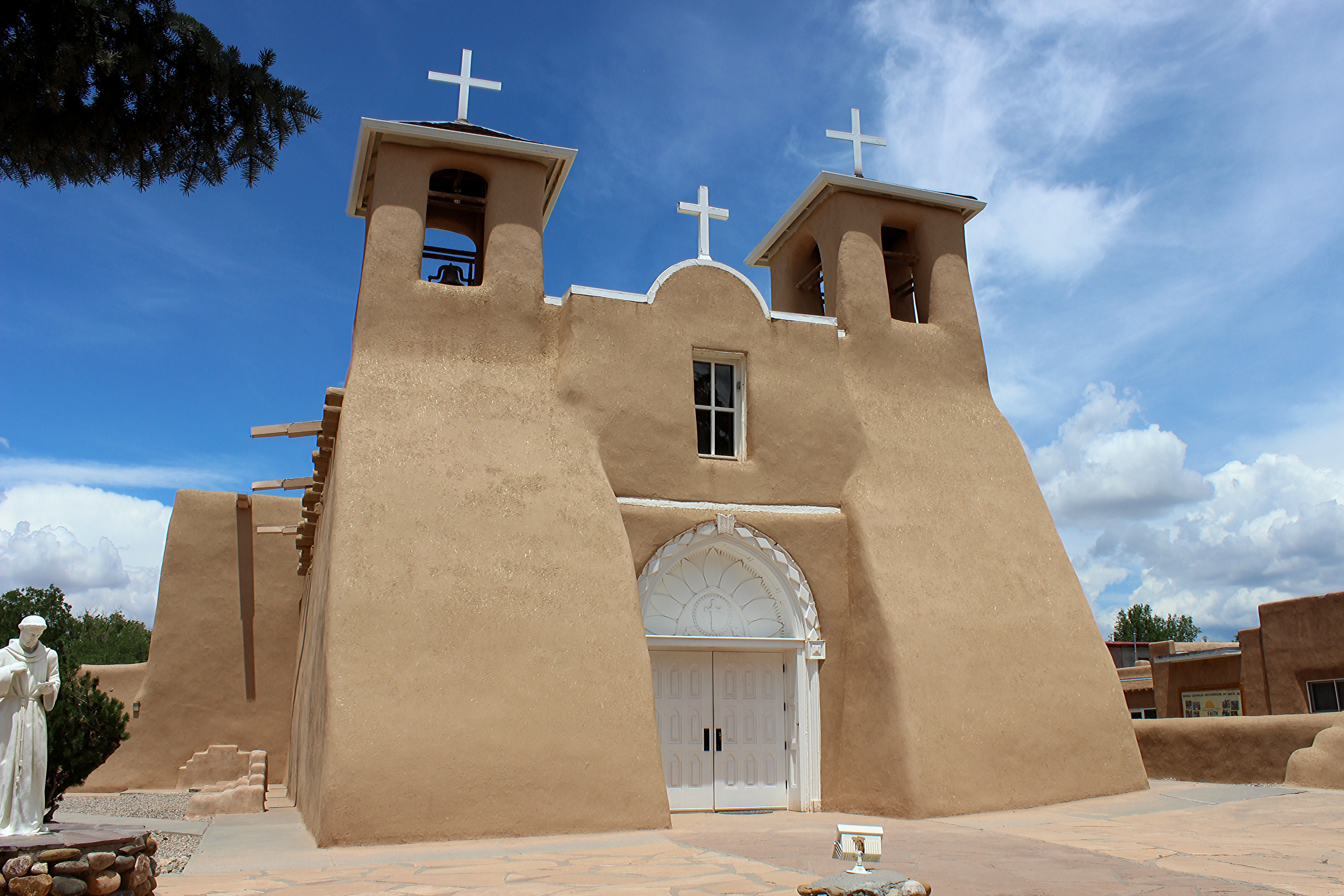
Front facade

== See also ==
- National Register of Historic Places listings in Taos County, New Mexico
- List of National Historic Landmarks in New Mexico
- New Mexico State Register of Cultural Properties (Registration no. 24)
