= Ranchos de Taos, New Mexico =

Census-designated place in Taos County, New Mexico, United States

- CDP
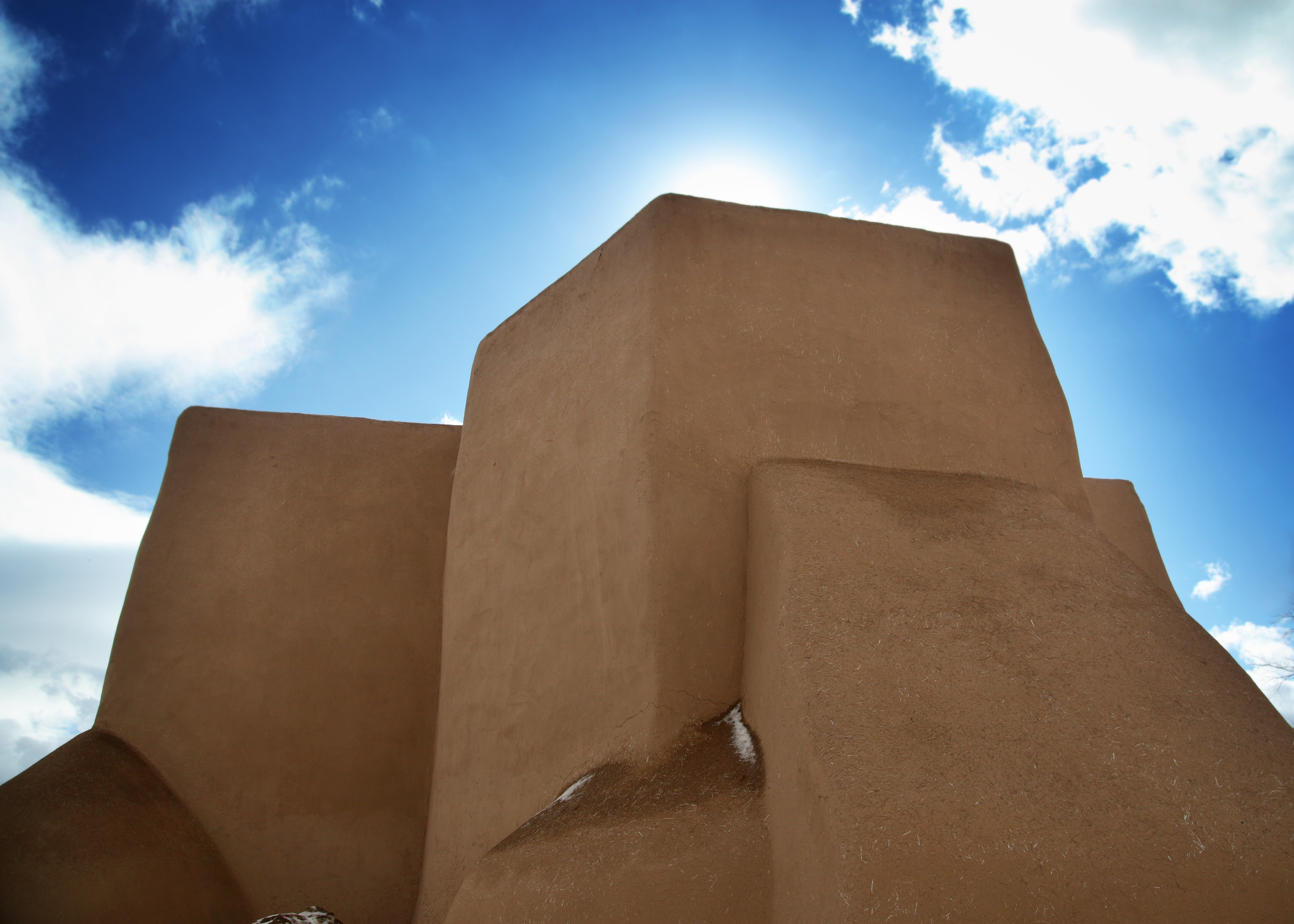
- San Francisco de Asis Church, February 2007

- Location of Ranchos de Taos, New Mexico

- Location in the United States
- Coordinates: 36°22′10″N 105°36′36″W
- Country: United States
- State: New Mexico
- County: Taos

Area
  - Total: 3.53 sq mi (9.14 km^{2})
  - Land: 3.53 sq mi (9.14 km^{2})
  - Water: 0 sq mi (0.00 km^{2})
- Elevation: 6,975 ft (2,126 m)

Population (2020)
  - Total: 2,707
  - Density: 767.5/sq mi (296.32/km^{2})
- Time zone: UTC-7 (Mountain (MST))
  - Summer (DST): UTC-6 (MDT)
- ZIP code: 87557
- Area code: 575
- FIPS code: 35-61710
- GNIS feature ID: 2409140

Ranchos de Taos is a census-designated place (CDP) in Taos County, New Mexico, United States. The population was 2,707 at the time of the 2020 census.

The historic district is the Ranchos de Taos Plaza, which includes the San Francisco de Asis Mission Church.

== History ==
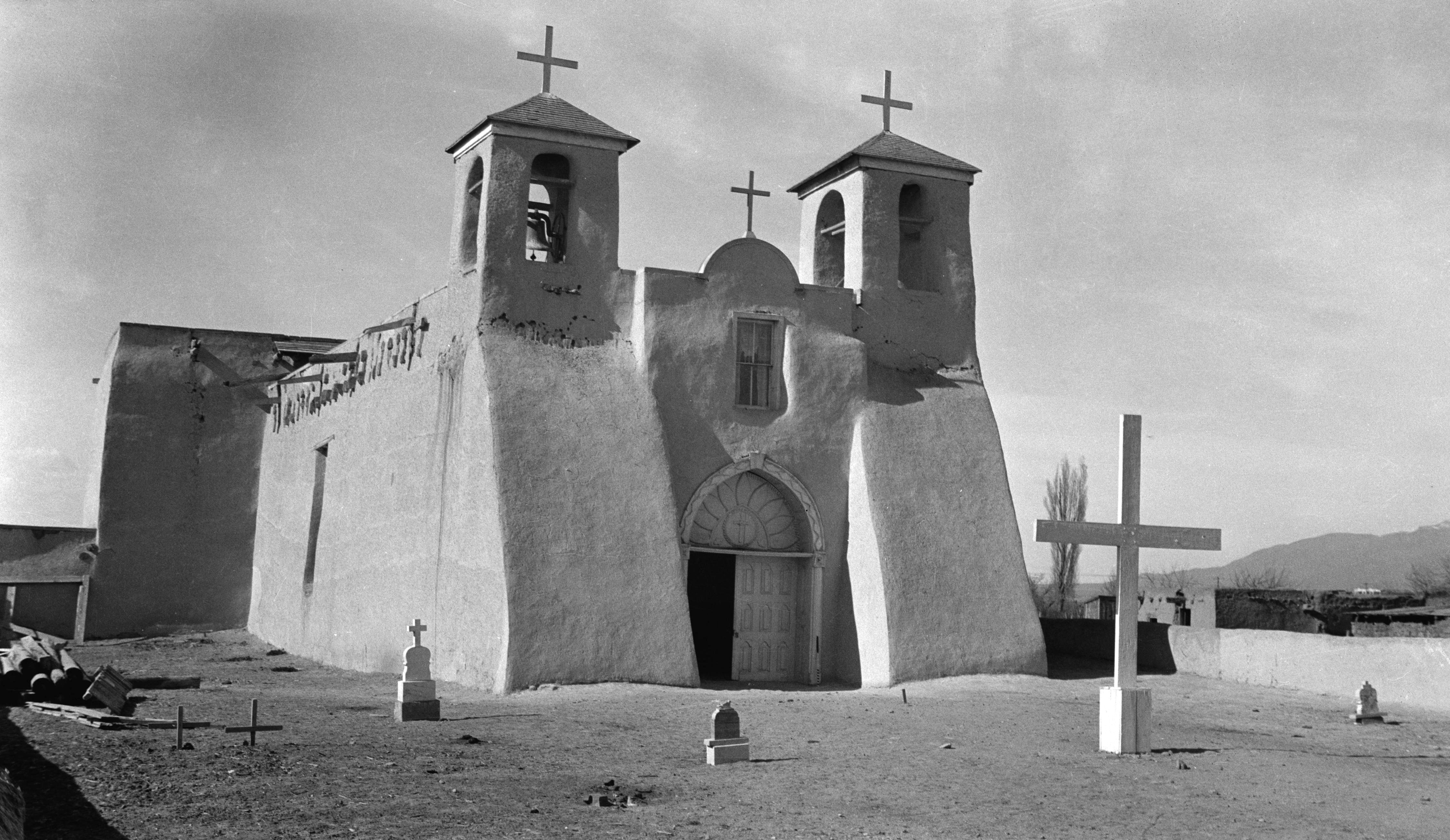
The Rancho de Taos church, March 1934

In 1725, the settlement that was originally called Las Trampas de Taos became the permanent Spanish settlement called Ranchos de Taos. In 1760, Ranchos de Taos, also called Taos "Old Town", was attacked by Comanches who took 50 women from a fortified house, the home of the Vidalpando family, and killed the men of the settlement.

Spanish settlers of the Taos Valley moved into the Taos Pueblo for safety from attacks from Plains Indians. In 1772 a mission church was begun. Between 1796 and 1797, land from the Don Fernando de Taos Land Grant was given to 63 Spanish families. In 1815 the San Francisco de Asis Mission Church was completed. The Taos region population grew as the result of land grants made by Mexico between 1821 and 1846.

== Geography ==
Ranchos de Taos is located approximately four miles southwest of Taos.

According to the United States Census Bureau, the CDP has a total area of 3.4 square miles (8.8 km^{2}), all land.

== Demographics ==
Historical population
Census	Pop.	Note	%±
2020	2,707		—
U.S. Decennial Census

=== 2020 census ===
As of the 2020 census, Ranchos de Taos had a population of 2,707. The median age was 46.9 years. 20.5% of residents were under the age of 18 and 24.2% of residents were 65 years of age or older. For every 100 females there were 95.9 males, and for every 100 females age 18 and over there were 91.7 males age 18 and over.

96.8% of residents lived in urban areas, while 3.2% lived in rural areas.

There were 1,140 households in Ranchos de Taos, of which 24.6% had children under the age of 18 living in them. Of all households, 37.4% were married-couple households, 20.7% were households with a male householder and no spouse or partner present, and 32.7% were households with a female householder and no spouse or partner present. About 35.2% of all households were made up of individuals and 17.4% had someone living alone who was 65 years of age or older.

There were 1,277 housing units, of which 10.7% were vacant. The homeowner vacancy rate was 0.1% and the rental vacancy rate was 6.8%.

Racial composition as of the 2020 census
Race	Number	Percent
White	1,373	50.7%
Black or African American	14	0.5%
American Indian and Alaska Native	73	2.7%
Asian	10	0.4%
Native Hawaiian and Other Pacific Islander	1	0.0%
Some other race	491	18.1%
Two or more races	745	27.5%
Hispanic or Latino (of any race)	1,747	64.5%

=== 2000 census ===
As of the census of 2000, there were 2,390 people, 984 households, and 619 families residing in the CDP. The population density was 705.9 inhabitants per square mile (272.5/km^{2}). There were 1,083 housing units at an average density of 319.9 per square mile (123.5/km^{2}). The racial makeup of the CDP was 62.34% White, 0.17% African American, 1.88% Native American, 0.46% Asian, 0.08% Pacific Islander, 31.97% from other races, and 3.10% from two or more races. Hispanic or Latino of any race were 75.31% of the population.

There were 984 households, out of which 32.8% had children under the age of 18 living with them, 43.2% were married couples living together, 14.3% had a female householder with no husband present, and 37.0% were non-families. 30.3% of all households were made up of individuals, and 8.7% had someone living alone who was 65 years of age or older. The average household size was 2.43 and the average family size was 3.05.

In the CDP, the population was spread out, with 25.8% under the age of 18, 7.5% from 18 to 24, 28.2% from 25 to 44, 26.7% from 45 to 64, and 11.8% who were 65 years of age or older. The median age was 37 years. For every 100 females, there were 91.5 males. For every 100 females age 18 and over, there were 89.6 males.

The median income for a household in the CDP was $28,750, and the median income for a family was $32,045. Males had a median income of $23,750 versus $18,382 for females. The per capita income for the CDP was $20,988. About 13.8% of families and 15.2% of the population were below the poverty line, including 22.6% of those under age 18 and 4.7% of those age 65 or over.

== Education ==
It is within Taos Municipal Schools, which operates Ranchos Elementary School in the community. Its secondary schools were Taos Middle School and Taos High School.

== See also ==
- List of census-designated places in New Mexico
- High Road to Taos, New Mexico
