= Ranchos de Taos Plaza =

- U.S. National Register of Historic Places
- U.S. Historic district
- NM State Register of Cultural Properties
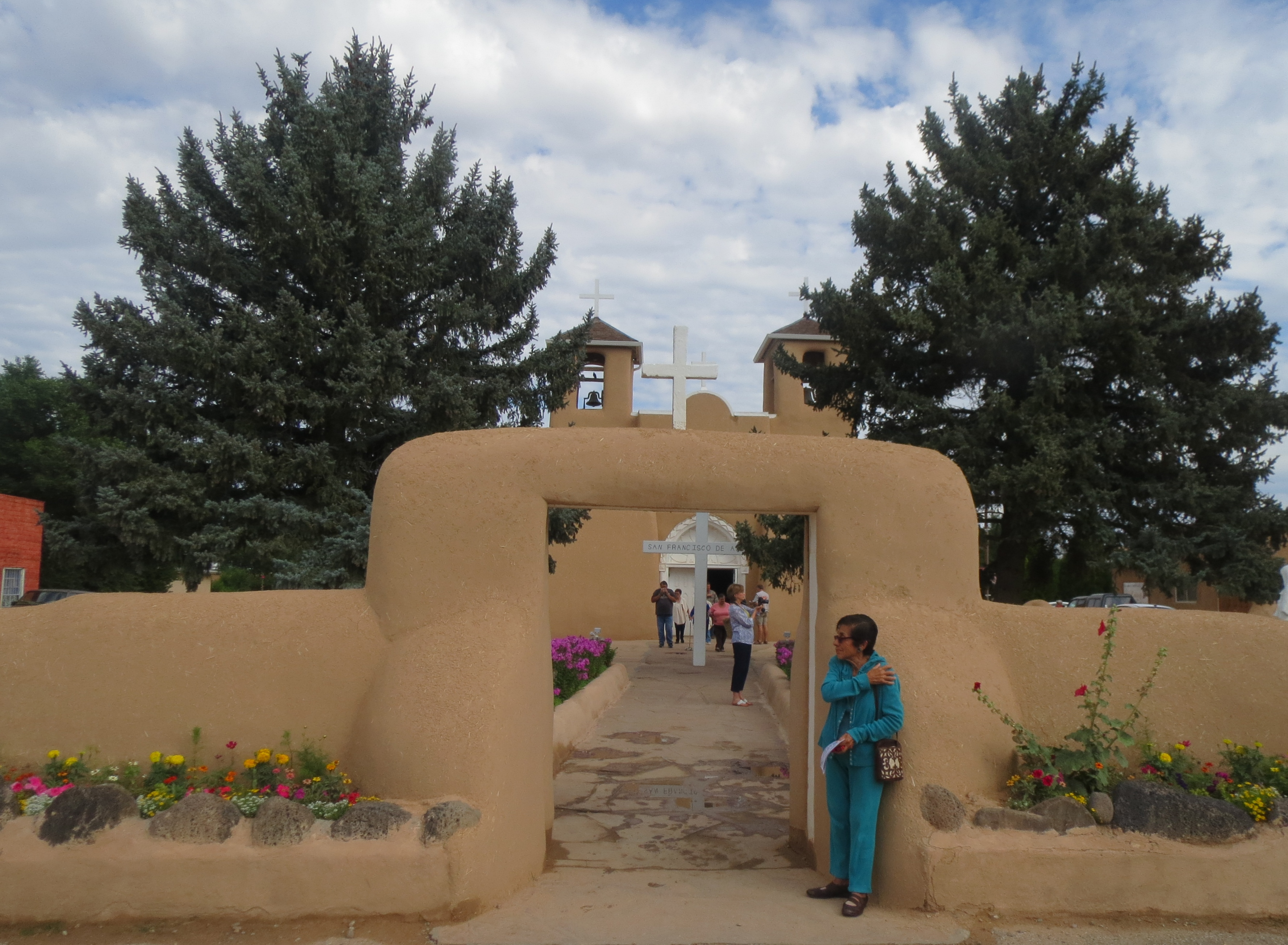
- San Francisco de Asis Mission Church

- Location within New Mexico
- Location: Off US 64, Ranchos de Taos, New Mexico
- Coordinates: 36°21′30″N 105°36′28″W
- Area: 8.5 acres (3.4 ha)
- Built: 1779
- Architectural style: Colonial, New Mexico Mission
- NRHP reference No.: 78001830
- NMSRCP No.: 51

Significant dates
- Added to NRHP: October 2, 1978
- Designated NMSRCP: March 21, 1969

Ranchos de Taos Plaza is a historic district in Ranchos de Taos, New Mexico, about four miles south of the town of Taos, New Mexico. There are 21 buildings over 84 acres in the historic district, including the San Francisco de Assisi Mission Church, a U.S. National Historic Landmark.

== Overview ==
Before Spanish colonialists settled in the Taos area in 1716, the area was home to Taos Native Americans who ranched and farmed in the area. There was a Spanish settlement in the Ranchos de Taos area by 1742 and there may have been residents of the Taos Pueblo who had farmed in the fertile area before that, in which case they sought the shelter of the Taos Pueblo during attacks by Comanche tribes.

The plaza is the original location of the village of Ranchos de Taos, built in the late 1770s. In 1776, Francisco Atanasio Domínguez wrote that "the settlement consists of scattered ranchos, and their owners are the citizens who live in the pueblo." At that time, Ranchos de Taos was the largest Spanish settlement in the Taos Valley. It is believed the fortified plaza was built by 1780 when Juan Agustin de Morfi wrote that "the settlement forms a square plaza, very capricious. Its houses were almost finished in 1779 with towers at proportionate distances for their defense." The plaza included an observation platforms in round towers and torreones for defense.

Fray Jose Benito Pereyro, priest of the Taos Pueblo, agreed to serve the settlers of the village. Around 1815, the San Francisco de Asis Mission Church was built under his direction.

In 1840 Matt Field wrote during his travels through New Mexico of Ranchos de Taos: "This town called the ranch lies at the base of a gigantic mountain and is watered by a swift stream that rushes from the ravine... It contains about 300 houses, and those are built completely together, forming a wall, enclosing a large square, in the center of which stands a church."

A video of the art and history of the mission church may be viewed at the parish office and gift shop, where santos and retablos made by local artists are sold. Along the plaza are adobe buildings that are now retail stores, galleries, and restaurants, one of which was a historic trading post, now Trading Post Cafe.

== Gallery ==
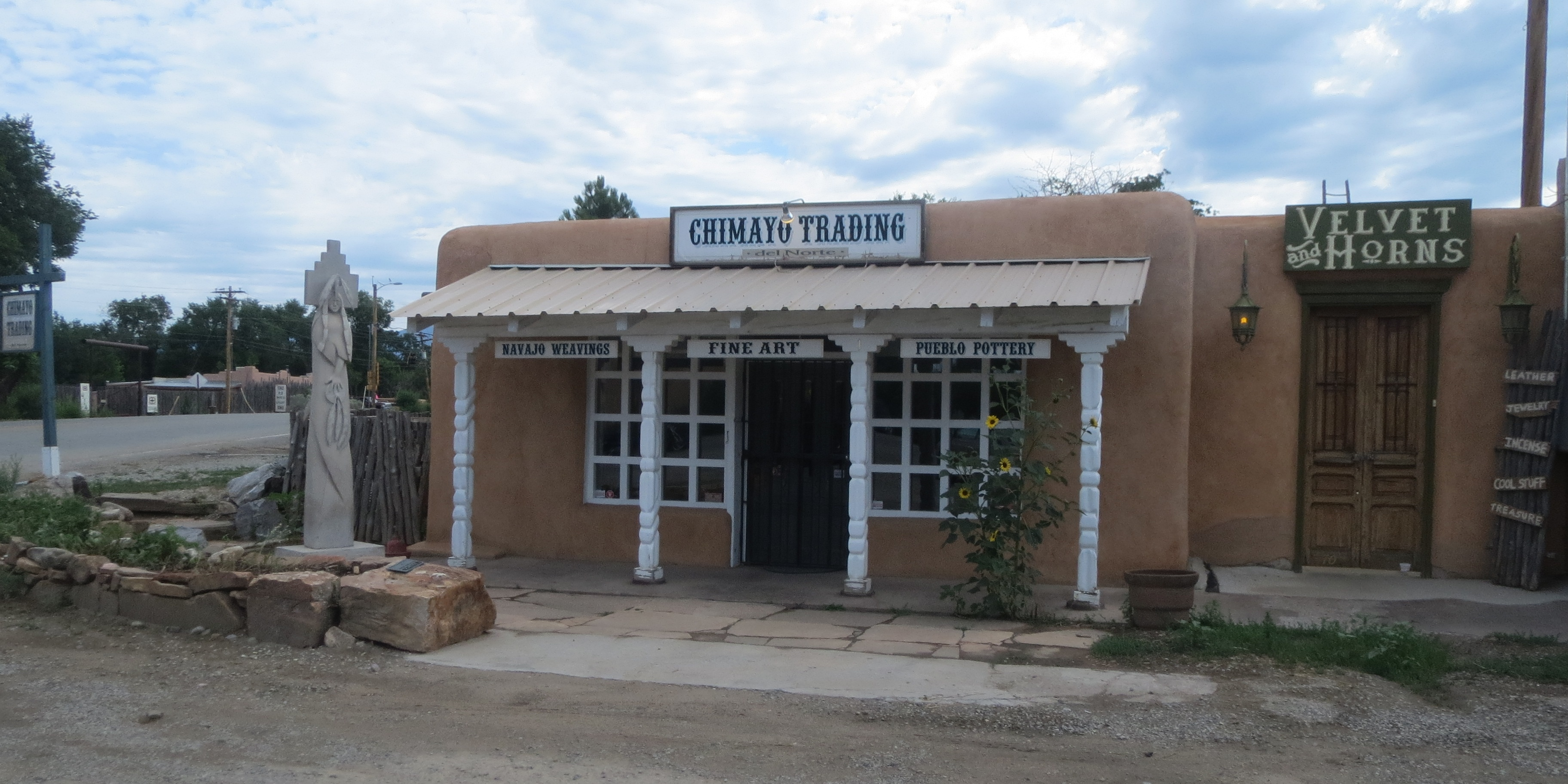
Ranchos de Taos Plaza shops

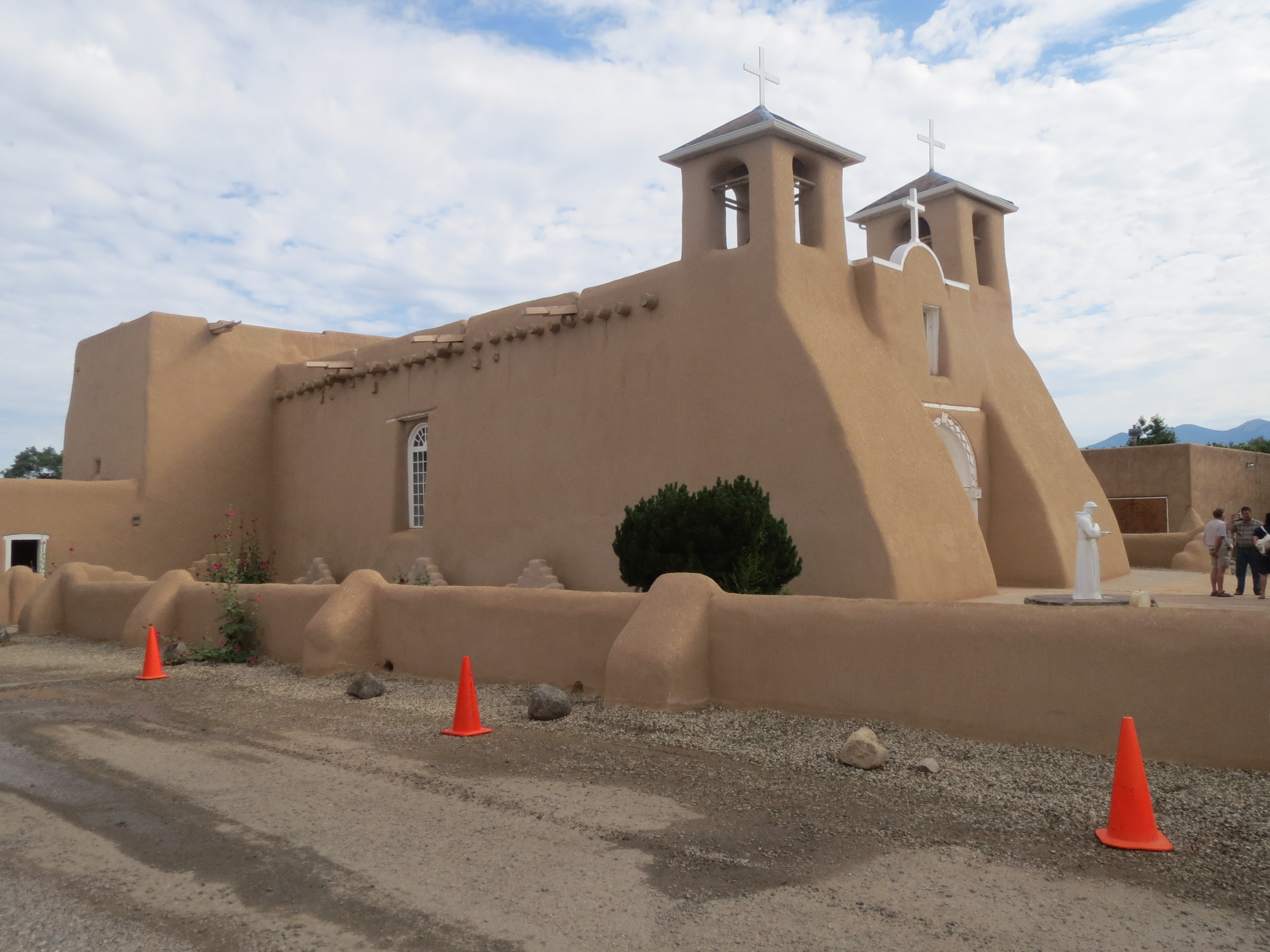
San Francisco de Asis Mission Church

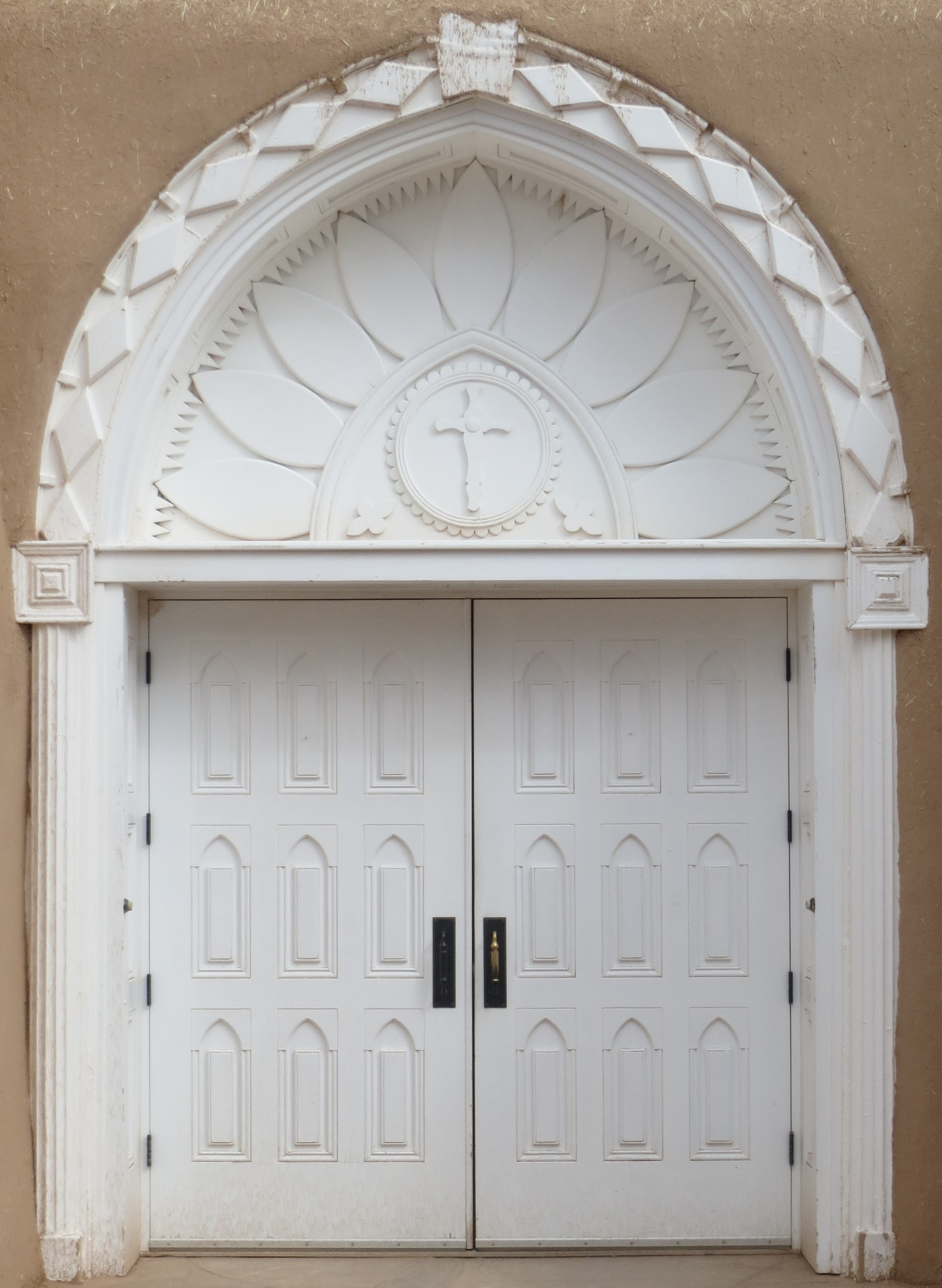
San Francisco de Asis Mission Church
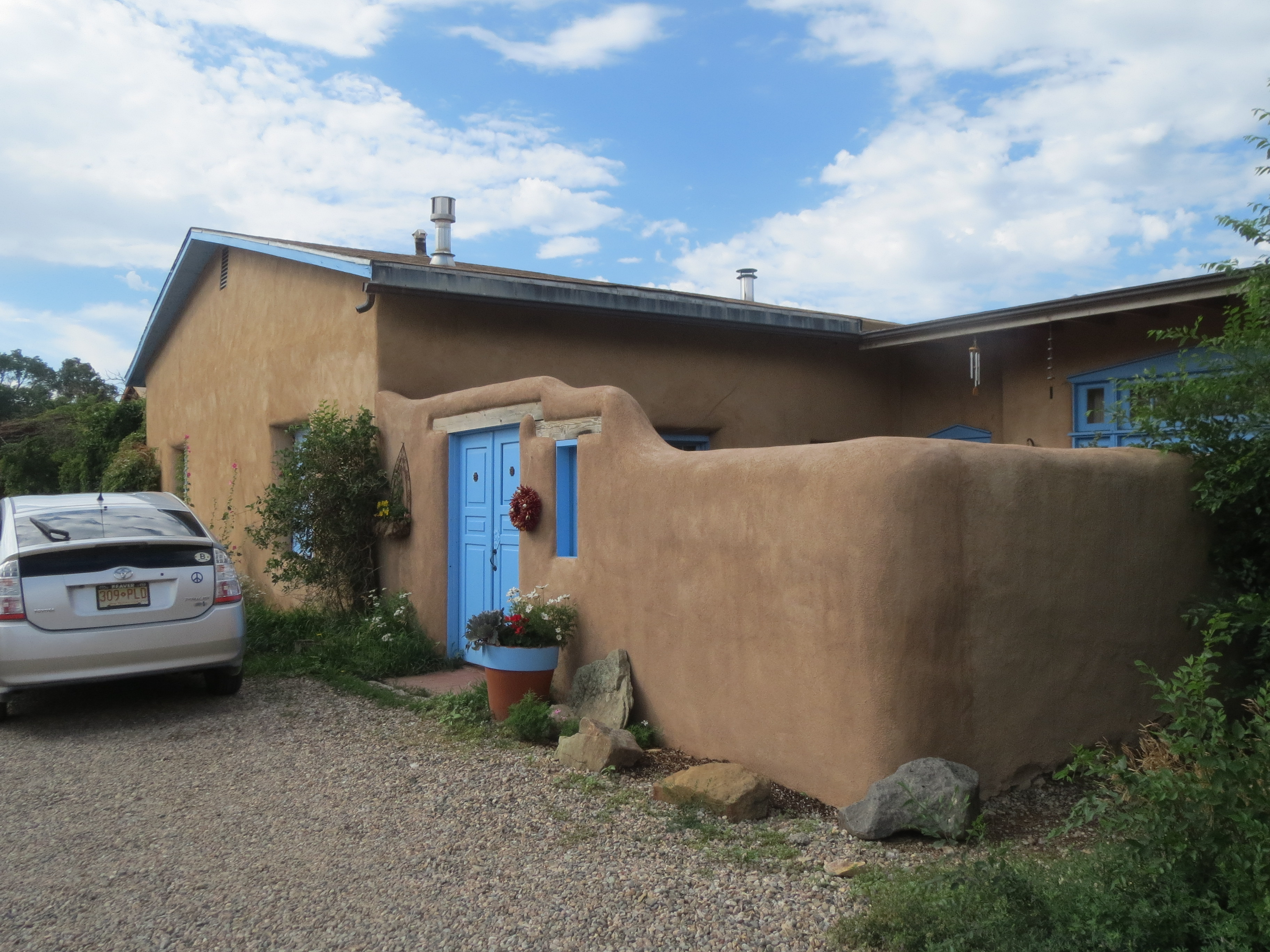
Ranchos de Taos Plaza house

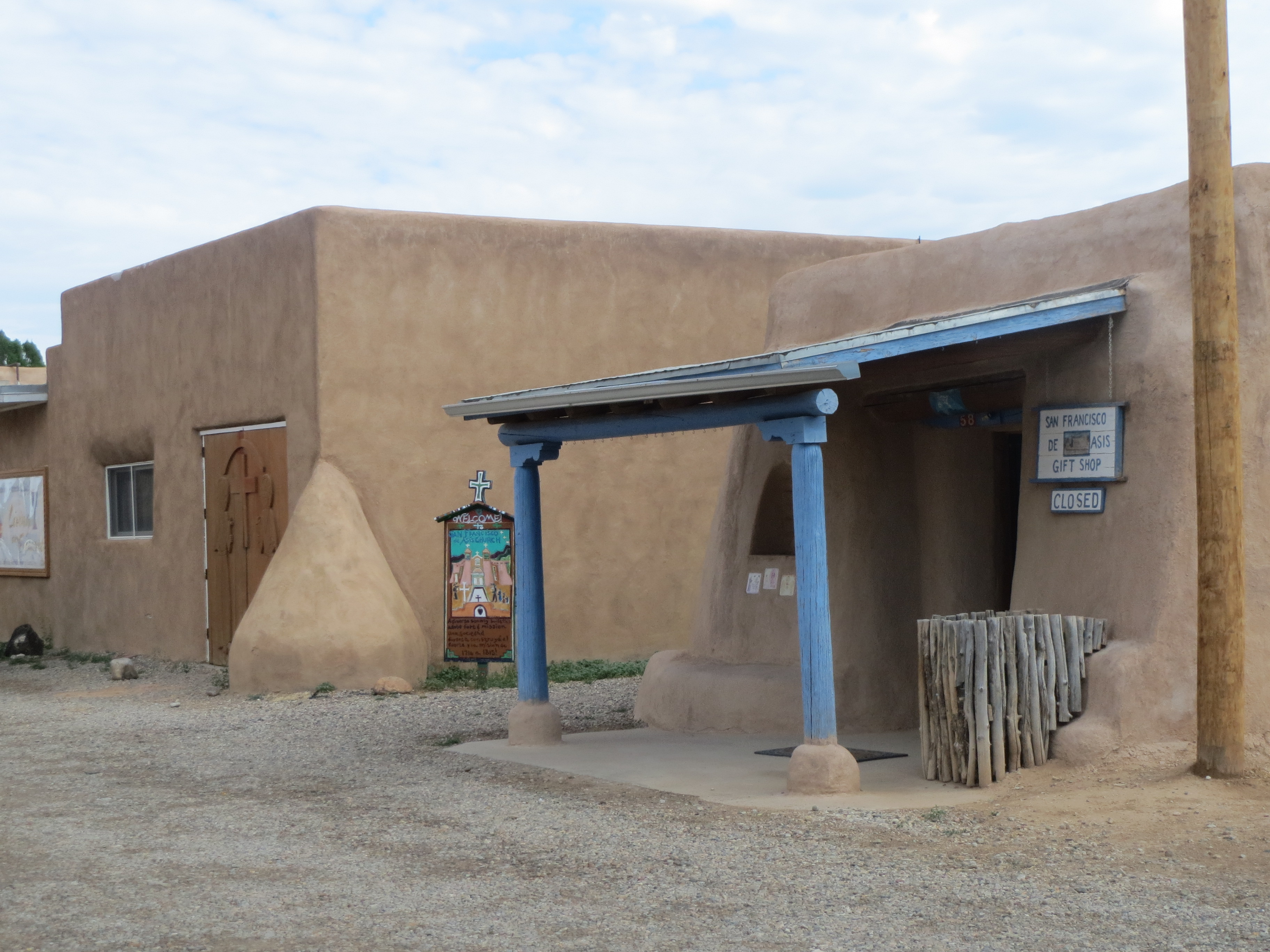
Ranchos de Taos Plaza shop and church building

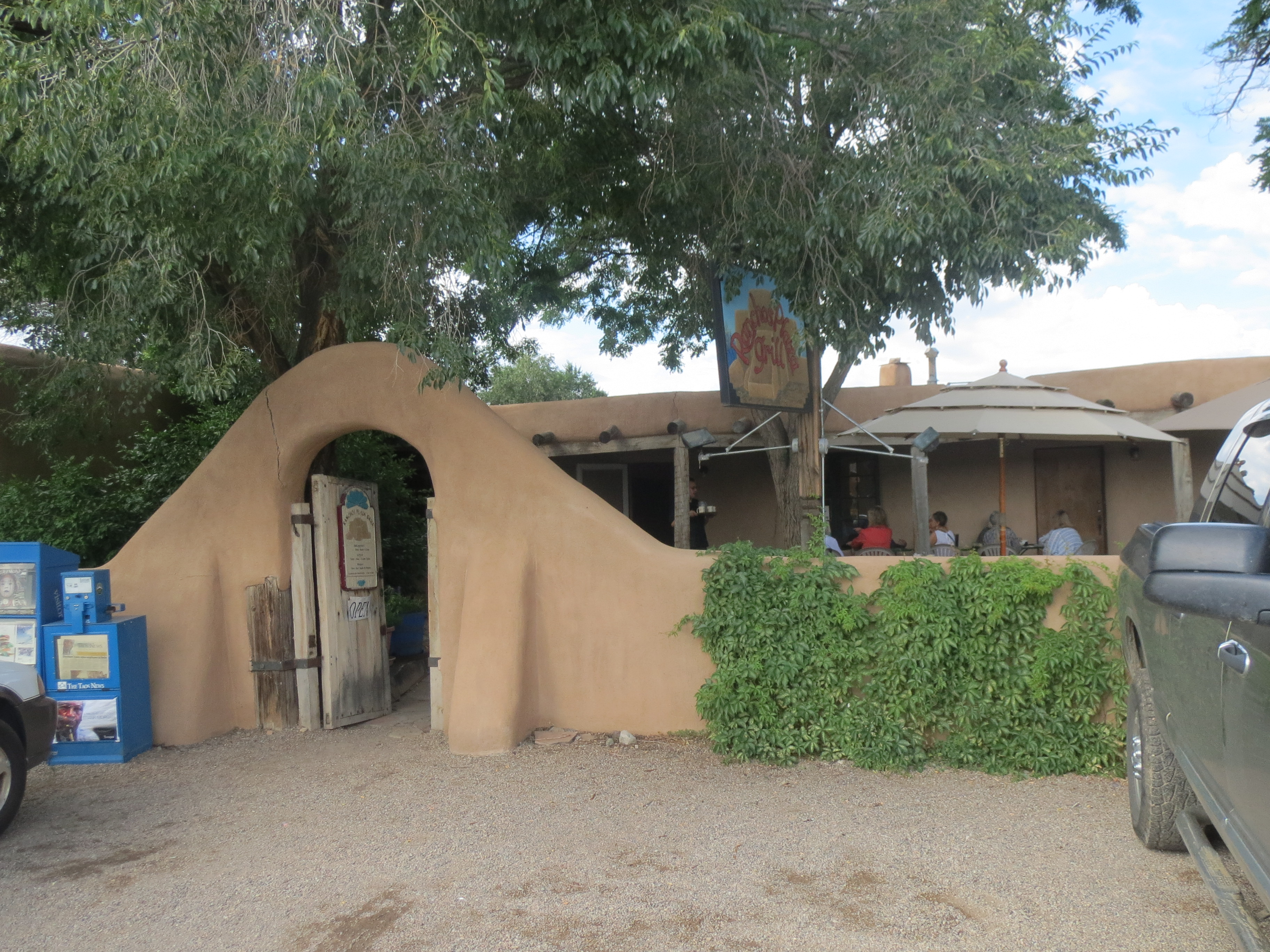
Ranchos de Taos Plaza restaurant

== See also ==
- National Register of Historic Places listings in Taos County, New Mexico
