= Abo (historic place) =

- U.S. National Register of Historic Places
- U.S. National Historic Landmark
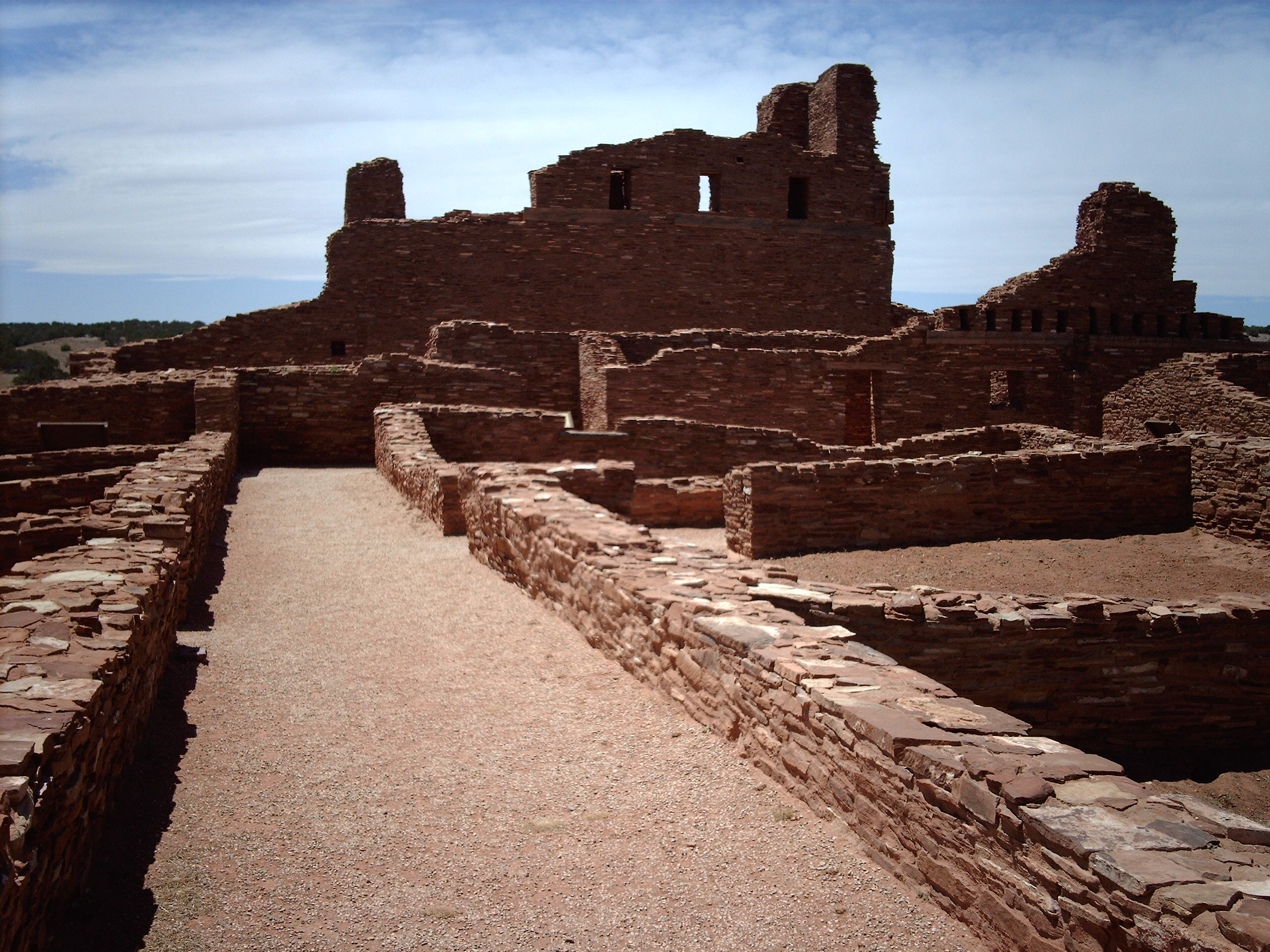
- Mission ruins at Abó

- Location within New Mexico Location within the United States
- Nearest city: Abo, New Mexico
- Coordinates: 34°26′56″N 106°22′17″W
- Area: 30 acres (12 ha)
- Built: 1629
- Part of: Salinas Pueblo Missions National Monument (ID66000494)
- NRHP reference No.: 66000497

Significant dates
- Added to NRHP: October 15, 1966
- Designated NHL: June 13, 1962

Abó, is a pueblo ruin in New Mexico that is preserved as part of the Salinas Pueblo Missions National Monument. The ruins are located about 9 miles (14 km) west of Mountainair, at about 6,100 feet (1,900 m) above sea level. They are said to date back to the 14th century. It was a major trading station during its time. There is a visitor contact station, a 0.25 miles (0.40 km) trail through the mission ruins, and a 0.5 miles (0.80 km) trail around the unexcavated pueblo ruins. The site was declared a National Historic Landmark in 1962.

Abo is also the geological type locality for the Abo Formation, which is made up of sandstone red beds and is exposed to the northwest of the Abo ruins.

== History ==
Abó was the site of a Native American Pueblo. The community, composed of Tompiro-speaking Tanoans, was recorded to have a population of more than 1,600 in 1641. The Tompiro language was likely related to Piro, as well as to Tiwa, which is still spoken at present-day Pueblos of Isleta and Sandia west of Abó.

As village-dwelling and sedentary Pueblo Indians, the Abó Tompiros' livelihood depended on agriculture. The region where they lived is more than 6,000 feet (1,800 meters) in elevation, near the upper climatic limit for corn cultivation. They had little surface water for irrigation, rainfall was sparse and sporadic, and winters were cold. Tompiro settlements were made viable by their proximity to salt deposits in the Salinas and to the bison herds of the Great Plains. The Tompiros were important traders and middlemen between the Plains Indians and the Pueblos of the Rio Grande Valley for salt and bison skins and meat. They also hunted small and large game in the region, especially deer, pronghorn, and rabbits and gathered wild foods, including pinyon (piñón) pine nuts.

Abó appears to have first entered documented historical records in 1583, when a visit to a site believed to be Abó was recorded by the Spanish explorer Antonio de Espejo. Spanish missionary work began there in 1622, and construction of the first church began in 1629. The Pueblo was abandoned around 1672, apparently due to drought and attacks by the Apaches. The Spanish recorded that Abó residents then moved to the Rio Grande valley, where they later sided with the Spanish in the 1680 Pueblo Rebellion.

The Abó site was acquired by the state in 1938, which preserved it as a state historic site. In 1981, management of the site was taken over by the National Park Service as part of the newly enlarged and renamed Gran Quivira National Monument, now the Salinas Pueblos National Monument.

== See also ==
- National Register of Historic Places listings in Torrance County, New Mexico
- List of National Historic Landmarks in New Mexico
