= Tiwa people (Americas) =

Ethnic group of Pueblo Native Americans

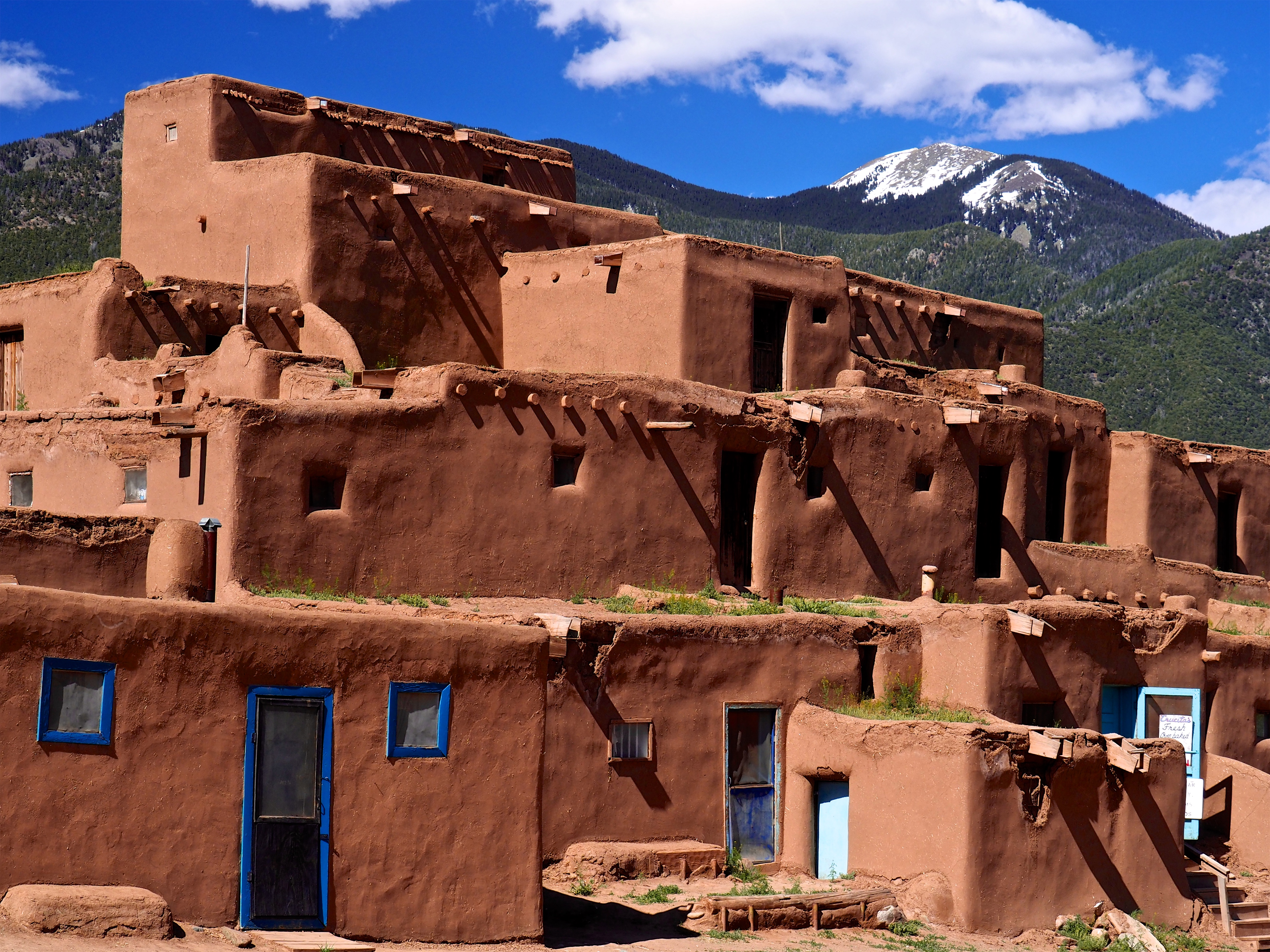
- This Tiwa apartment in Taos Pueblo is the oldest continuously-inhabited building in the United States, pictured with the snow-capped peak of Maxwaluna in the background.

Regions with significant populations
- Southwestern United States

New Mexico and Texas
- New Mexico

Languages
- Taos language, Southern Tiwa, New Mexican Spanish, English

Religion
- Pueblo religion, Roman Catholicism, minority Protestantism

The Tiwa, less commonly Tigua, are a group of related Tanoan Pueblo peoples in New Mexico that traditionally speak a Tiwa language (although some speakers have switched to Spanish and/or English), and are divided into the two Northern Tiwa groups, in Taos and Picuris, and the Southern Tiwa in Isleta and Sandia, around what is now Albuquerque, and in Ysleta del Sur near El Paso, Texas.

== Name ==
Tiwa is the English name for these peoples, which is derived from the Spanish term Tigua and put into use by Frederick Webb Hodge. The Spanish term has also been used in English writings although the term Tiwa now is dominant.

In Spanish Tigua only was applied to the Southern Tiwa groups (in Tiguex territory). Spanish variants of Tigua include Cheguas, Chiguas, Téoas, Tiguas, Tigües, Tiguesh, Tigüex, Tiguex, Tigüez, Tihuex, Tioas, Tziquis. The names Atzigues, Atziqui, Tihues, and Tziquis were originally applied to the Piro but later writers confused these terms for the Piro with the terms for the Southern Tiwa. A further confusion is with some of the terms for the Tewa (Tegua, Tehuas, Teoas) being applied to both the Tewa and (Southern) Tiwa indiscriminately. The forms Tiguesh, Tigüex, and Tiguex are meant to represent a pronunciation of [tiweʃ], which is supposedly an Isletan term meaning "Isletan" according to Adolph Francis Alphonse Bandelier. The term Tiguan is usually given instead Bandelier's Tigüex, this being a representation of the Isletan term for "Southern Tiwas" and recorded in modern times as Tíwan with the term Tiwáde for the singular "(a) Southern Tiwa" (J. P. Harrington recorded the singular as Tiwa and said that Tiwa/Tiwan could also be used to refer to Northern Tiwas).

The Spanish spelling of the name as Tihua is contemporarily accepted, though the anglicized form (Tiwa) is, perhaps, academically more prevalent.

The Governor of the New Mexico Territory, LeBaron Bradford Prince, wrote about a difference between the Tehua pueblos and the Tihua nation.

== History ==
Among extant Pueblo groups, the Tiwa are thought to be the earliest inhabitants of the upper Rio Grande Valley, with Tewa and Keres groups settling the region at later dates.

The Tiwa are first mentioned by Coronado in 1540, and a pueblo (town) referred to by him as both Coofor and Tiguex was most likely the pueblo known since a Spanish map of 1602 as Santiago Pueblo (Bandelier's Puaray). Coronado fought the Tiguex War against 12 of the southern Tiwa pueblos around what is now Albuquerque, which together with the diseases and consolidation of missions by the Catholic priests the Spanish brought, resulted in the abandonment of many of the villages.

In February 1583, the merchant Antonio de Espejo came up the Rio Grande to Tiguex (Kuaua), and Puaray (Espejo's own statement).

The everyday life of Tiwas Indians of Isleta Pueblo during the end of the 19th century is described in the book "The Padre of Isleta". A band of peaceful Tiwa, called Tigua, are massacred in Cormac McCarthy's Blood Meridian, referring to a period around 1849–50.

== See also ==
- Tiwa languages
- Piro Pueblo, a related Pueblo group
