= Sandia Mountains =

Mountain range in New Mexico, United States

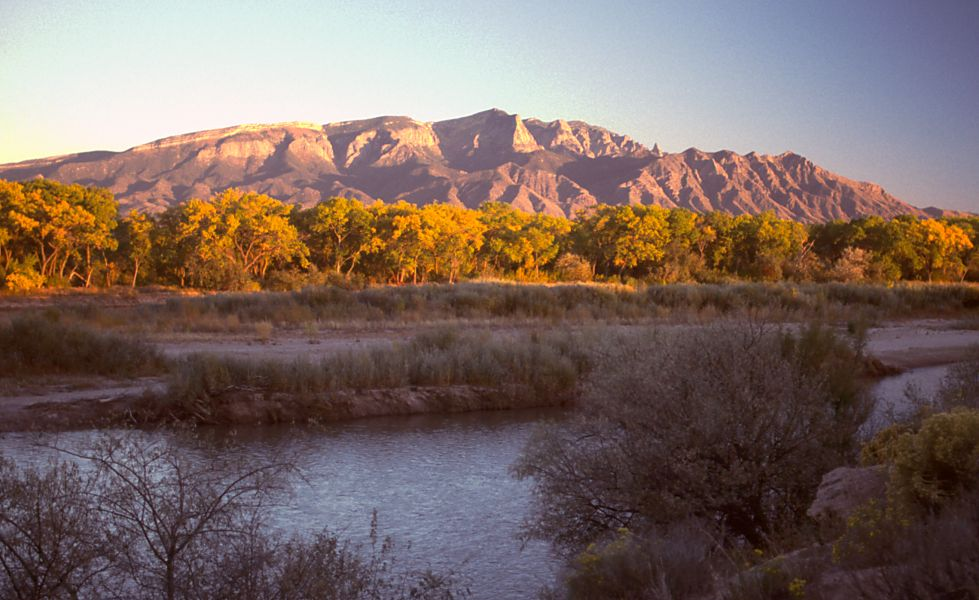
- The Sandia Mountains and Rio Grande at sunset, looking southeast from Bernalillo

Highest point
- Peak: Sandia Crest
- Elevation: 10,678 ft (3,255 m)
- Prominence: 4,201 ft (1,280 m) (crest)
- Coordinates: 35°12′32″N 106°26′49″W

Dimensions
- Length: 17 mi (27 km) N-S
- Width: 8 mi (13 km) E-W

Naming
- Native name: Posu gai hoo-oo (Southern Tiwa); Bien Mur (Southern Tiwa)

Geography
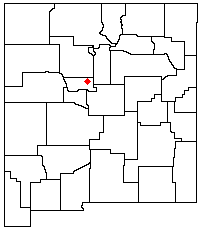
- Location of the Sandia Mountains within New Mexico
- Country: United States
- State: New Mexico
- Parent range: Sandia–Manzano Mountains
- Borders on: Albuquerque, NM

The Sandia Mountains (Southern Tiwa: Bien Mur or Posu gai hoo-oo, Tewa: Oekuu Pʼin, Eastern Keres: Tsepe) is a mountain range located in Bernalillo and Sandoval counties, immediately to the east of the city of Albuquerque in New Mexico in the southwestern United States. The mountain range is just due south of the southern terminus of the Rocky Mountains, and is part of the Sandia–Manzano Mountains. This is largely within the Cibola National Forest and protected as the Sandia Mountain Wilderness. The highest point is Sandia Crest, 10,678 feet (3,255 m) AMSL.

== Name ==
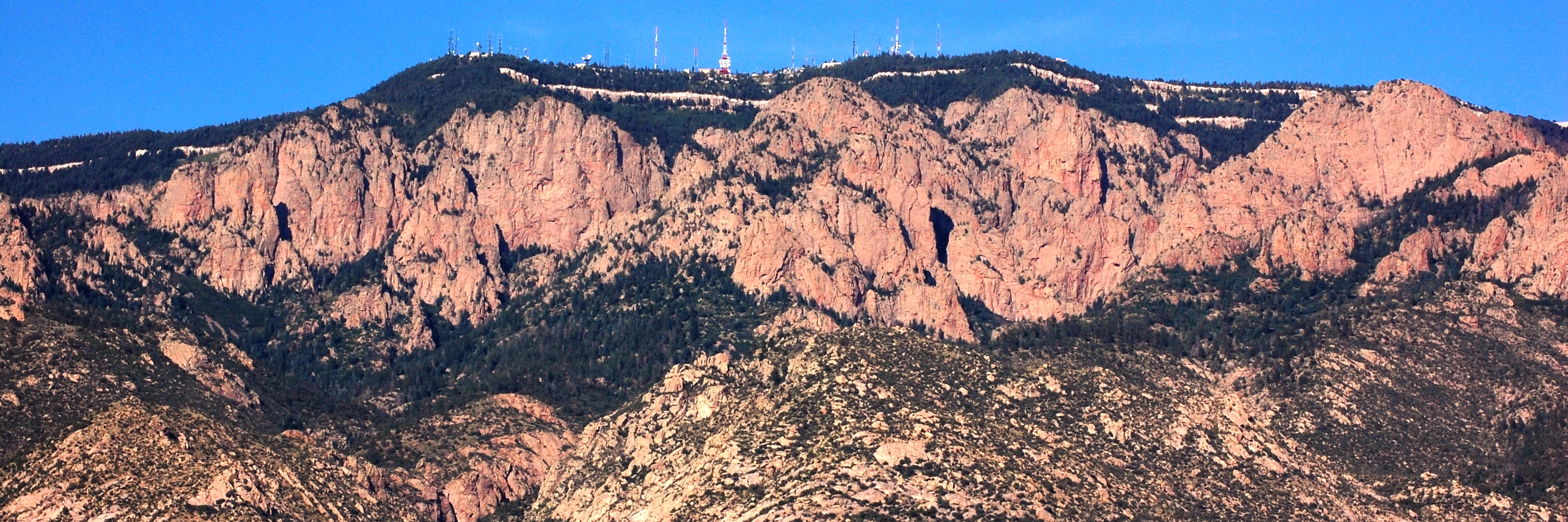
Sandia Crest from the west, with adjacent radio and TV towers

Sandía means watermelon in Spanish, and is popularly believed to be a reference to the reddish color of the mountains at sunset. Also, when viewed from the west, the profile of the mountains is a long ridge, with a thin zone of green conifers near the top, suggesting the "rind" of the watermelon. However, as Robert Julyan notes, "the most likely explanation is the one believed by the Sandia Indians: the Spaniards, when they encountered the Pueblo in 1540, called it Sandia, because they thought the squash gourds growing there were watermelons, and the name Sandia soon was transferred to the mountains east of the pueblo."

In Southern Tiwa, Posu gai hoo-oo means "where water slides down arroyo". The people of Sandia Pueblo, who are Southern Tiwa speakers, sometimes call the mountain Bien Mur, "big mountain". In Tewa, Oekuu Pʼin (pronounced [òːkùː pʼìŋ]) means "turtle mountain" (oekuu, "turtle"; pʼin, "mountain"). The Sandias are mentioned in pueblo mythology as a sacred mountain of the South of the Tewa.

The Sandia Mountains feature in the traditions of numerous Indigenous peoples. Other Indigenous names for the Sandias include:

- Eastern Keres: Tsepe
- Navajo: Dził Nááyisí
- Northern Tiwa: Kep’íanenemą
- Jemez: Kiutawe
- Zuni: Chibiya Yalanne

== Layout and neighboring ranges ==
The Sandia range is small and a part of the Basin and Range Province. It was created by a different phenomenon known as rifting and consists of a single north–south ridge, that rises to two major summits: Sandia Crest and South Sandia Peak, 9,782 ft (2,982 m). The range measures approximately 17 miles (27 km) north-south, and the width in the east–west direction varies from 4 to 8 miles (6.4 to 12.9 km). The west side of the range is steep and rugged, with a number of sheer rock walls and towers near Sandia Crest. The east side has a gentler slope.

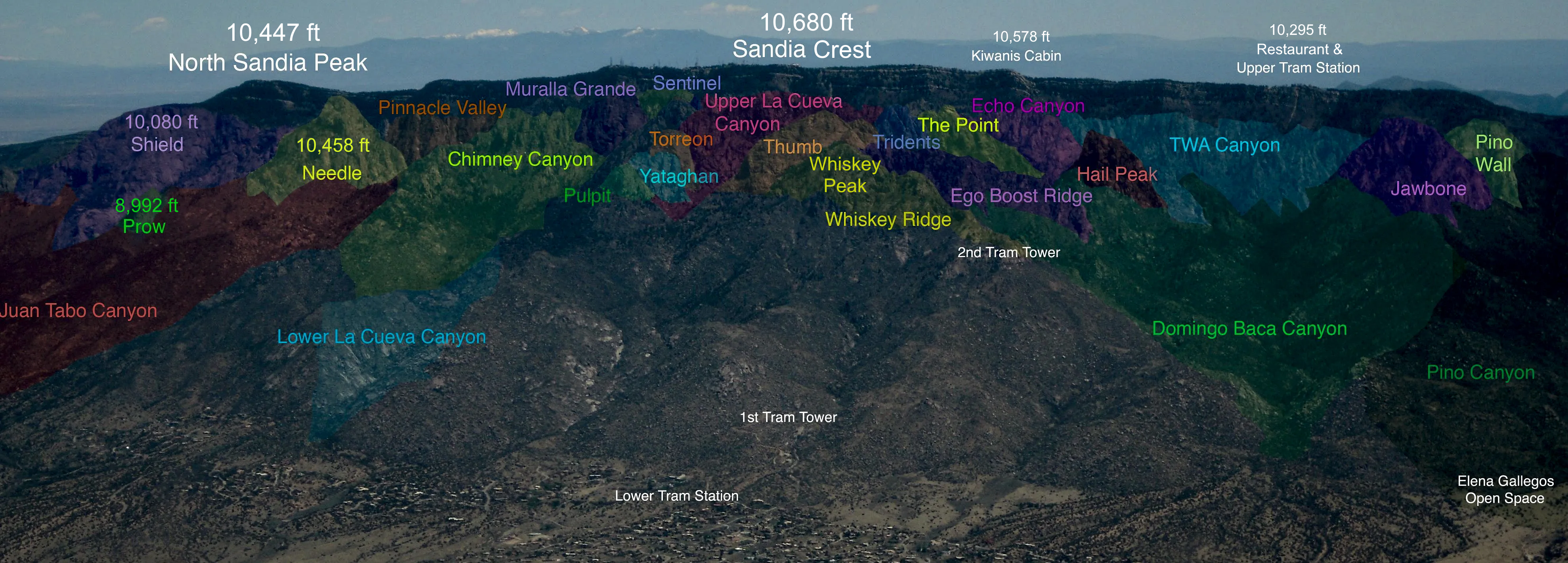
Sandias from the west, with key features labeled. Original by Garon Coriz.

The Sandias are part of a single larger geologic unit, the Sandia–Manzano Mountains, which consists of two other parts: the Manzanita Mountains and the Manzano Mountains (both of which lie to the south of the Sandias). The Sandia mountains are separated from the Manzano mountains by the Manzanitas. One of the notable features in the Sandia mountains is Tijeras Canyon which leads to a historically important pass; the canyon is traversed by Interstate 40, following the route of historic U.S. Route 66.

The Sandias are the highest range in the immediate vicinity, and are well-separated from the higher Sangre de Cristo Mountains. This gives Sandia Crest a relatively high topographic prominence of 4,098 ft (1,249 m). Lying to the east and northeast of the Sandias are two smaller ranges, the Ortiz Mountains and the San Pedro Mountains.

The Sandia Mountains are home to the world's second longest tramway, Sandia Peak Tramway, which is 2.7 miles (4.3 km) long. Over this distance the tram cars ascend over 4,000 feet (1,200 m). The average speed of the tram car is 12 mph (19 km/h), and the length of the ride is approximately 15 minutes.

== Climate ==
Climate data for Sandia Crest, New Mexico (elevation 10690 ft; 1953–1979)
Month	Jan	Feb	Mar	Apr	May	Jun	Jul	Aug	Sep	Oct	Nov	Dec	Year
Record high °F (°C)	48 (9)	49 (9)	56 (13)	60 (16)	71 (22)	82 (28)	80 (27)	79 (26)	71 (22)	62 (17)	59 (15)	50 (10)	82 (28)
Mean daily maximum °F (°C)	26.8 (−2.9)	28.3 (−2.1)	32.6 (0.3)	42.2 (5.7)	53.2 (11.8)	63.9 (17.7)	66.3 (19.1)	62.9 (17.2)	57.1 (13.9)	47.8 (8.8)	36.6 (2.6)	29.5 (−1.4)	45.6 (7.6)
Mean daily minimum °F (°C)	13.1 (−10.5)	14.1 (−9.9)	17.3 (−8.2)	24.7 (−4.1)	33.9 (1.1)	43.1 (6.2)	47.4 (8.6)	45.6 (7.6)	40.7 (4.8)	32.5 (0.3)	22.2 (−5.4)	15.5 (−9.2)	29.2 (−1.6)
Record low °F (°C)	−15 (−26)	−12 (−24)	−10 (−23)	−2 (−19)	8 (−13)	22 (−6)	29 (−2)	24 (−4)	19 (−7)	−2 (−19)	−10 (−23)	−19 (−28)	−19 (−28)
Average precipitation inches (mm)	1.96 (50)	1.91 (49)	2.34 (59)	1.26 (32)	0.91 (23)	0.95 (24)	3.19 (81)	3.38 (86)	1.82 (46)	1.83 (46)	1.39 (35)	2.01 (51)	22.94 (583)
Average snowfall inches (cm)	19.3 (49)	23 (58)	23.3 (59)	10.7 (27)	3.8 (9.7)	0.1 (0.25)	0 (0)	0 (0)	0.1 (0.25)	5.3 (13)	10 (25)	20.7 (53)	116.2 (295)
Source: Western Regional Climate Center

== Geology ==
The Sandia Mountains are a fault block range, on the eastern edge of the Rio Grande Rift Valley. The Sandias were uplifted in the last ten million years as part of the formation of the Rio Grande Rift. They form the eastern boundary of the Albuquerque Basin. The core of the range consists of Sandia granite, with a U-Pb age of 1453±12 million years. There is also some metamorphic rock of age 1.60 billion years. This is topped by a relatively thin layer (approximately 300 feet (91 meters) of sedimentary rock (mostly limestone, and some sandstone) of Pennsylvanian age (circa 300 million years ago). The limestone contains marine fossils including crinoids, brachiopods, gastropods, horn corals, and bryozoans. However, most of the fossils are too small for the human eye to detect. Potassium-feldspar (K-spar) crystals embedded within the Sandia granite give the mountains their distinct pink color.

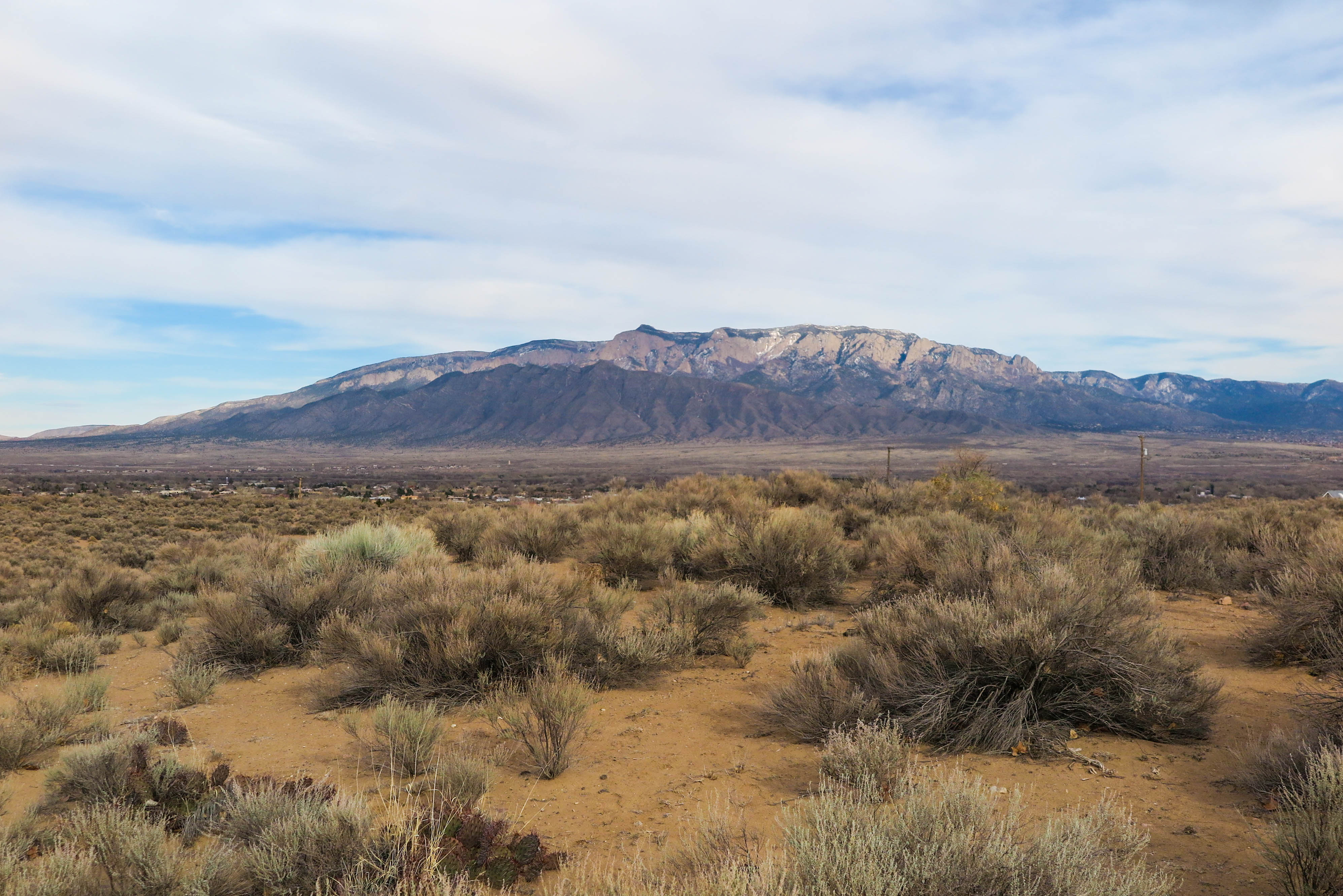
Sandia Mountains as seen from Rio Rancho, New Mexico
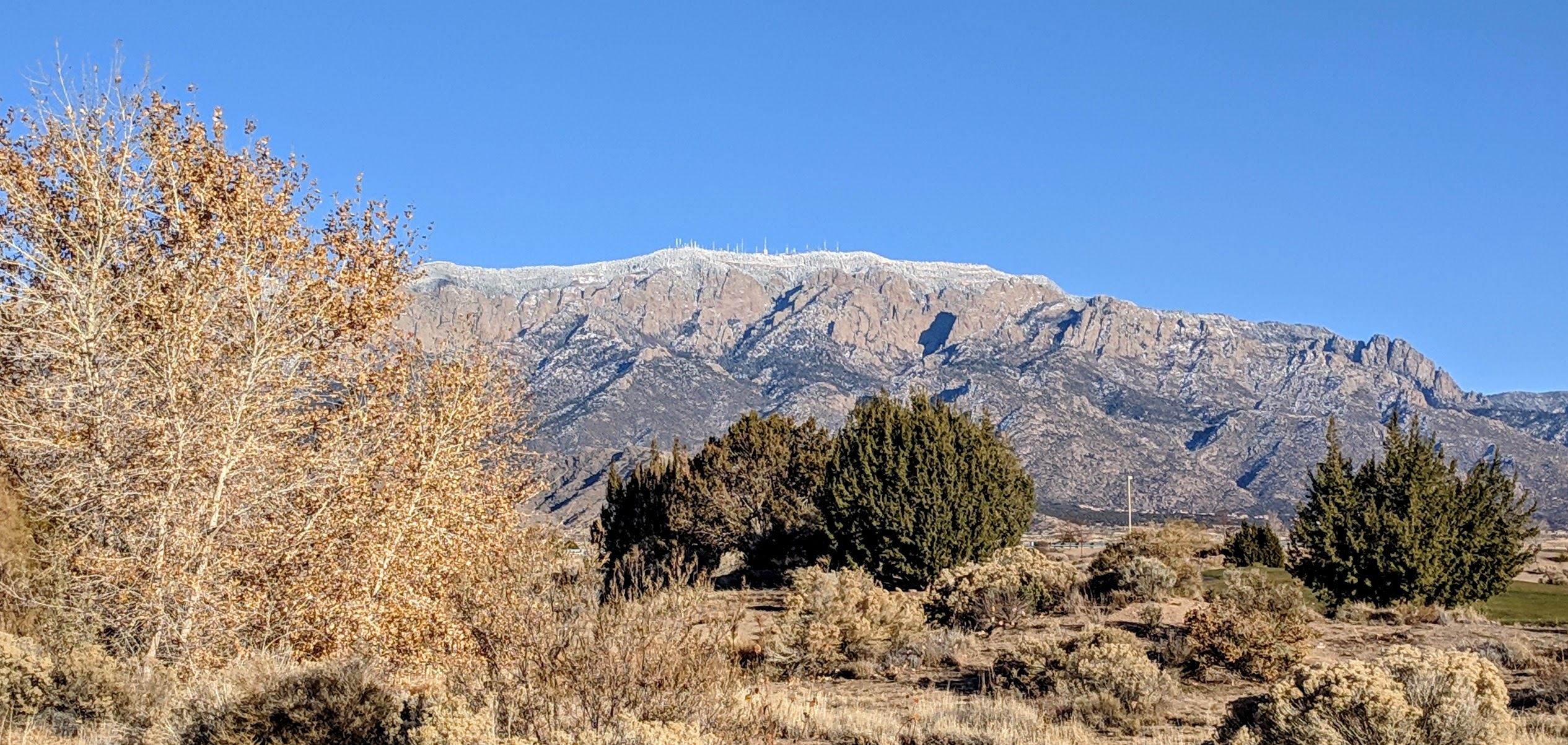
Sandia Crest with a wisp of snow, viewed from Sandia Resort & Casino, just north of Albuquerque
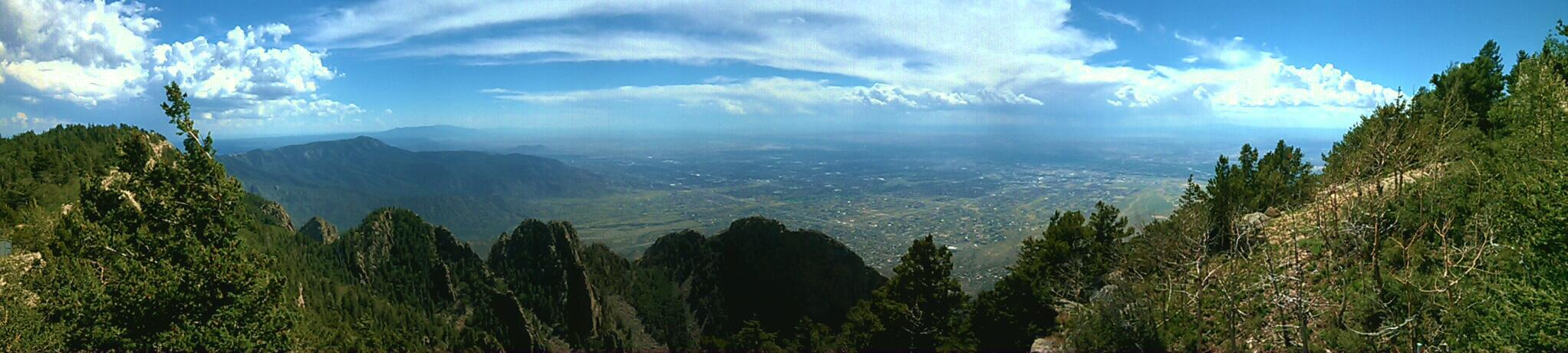
A panoramic view from Sandia Crest in August, centered to the southwest and showing Albuquerque in the distance
Sandia mountains in January 2016

== Ecology ==
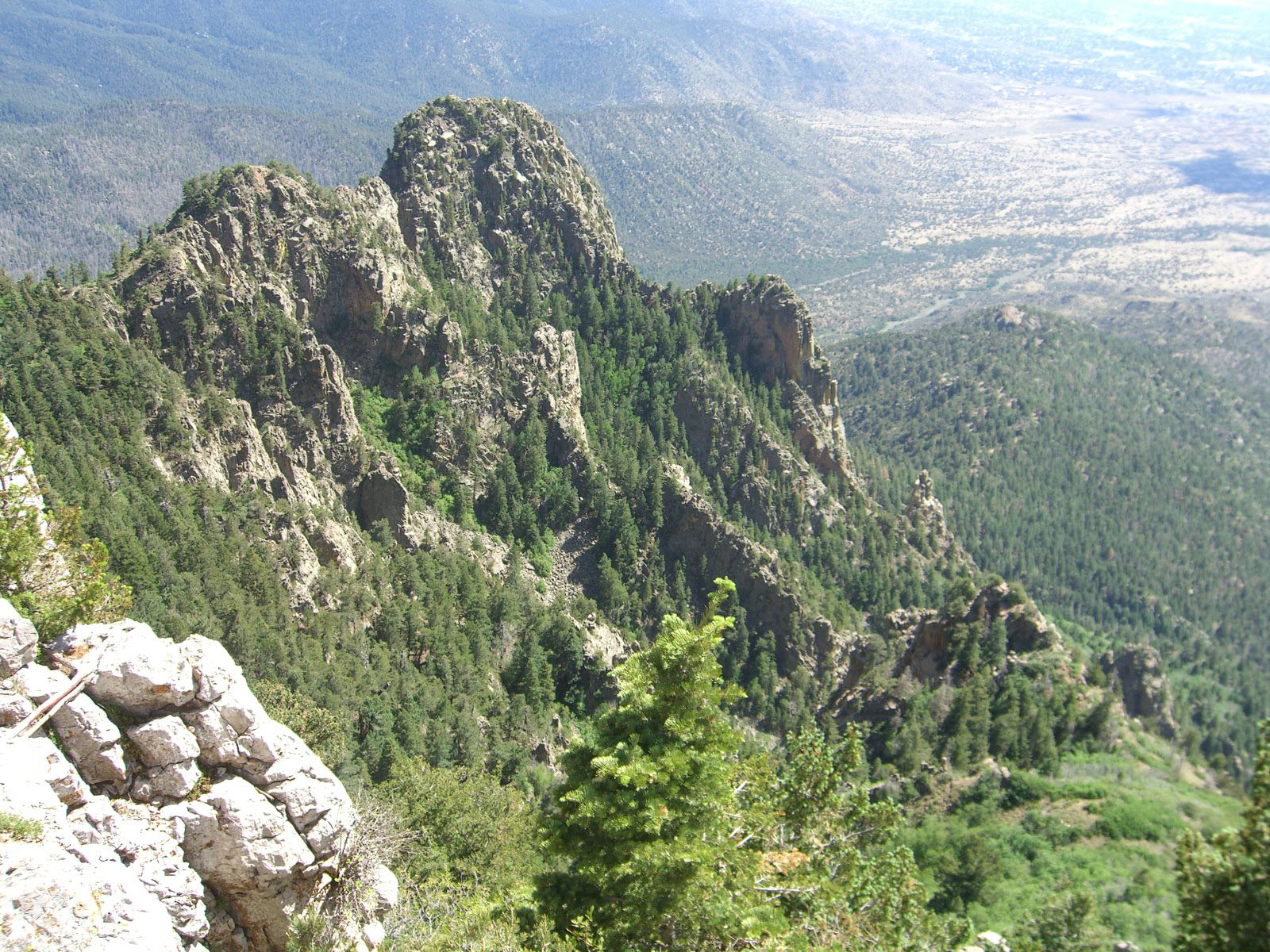
View from Sandia Peak, looking southwest

Entirely located within the Arizona/New Mexico Mountains ecoregion, per the Bailey's Ecoregions (US Forest Service) and the EPA Ecoregions systems, the Sandia Mountains vary much in land form, climate and species. Affinities with interior chaparral occur on lower elevations of the western slopes, while the crest and upper elevations of both slopes have affinities with the Rocky Mountains to the north.

The Sandia Mountains also encompass four different named life zones from the base to the top, due to the large changes in elevation, temperature, and precipitation. The desert grassland and savanna at the western base of the mountains (near the eastern edge of the City of Albuquerque, east of about Juan Tabo Boulevard) is part of the Upper Sonoran Zone. From 5,500 to 7,200 ft (1,700 to 2,200 m) on the milder climate western slopes of the Sandia Mountains on mostly granitic bedrock, the Upper Sonoran Zone is found. A juniper savanna mixes with desert grassland in lower elevations, while slightly higher a mixed Piñon-Juniper-Oak zone expands outward and upward from arroyos, including a thin cover of grasses such as black grama (Bouteloua eriopoda), sideoats grama (Bouteloua curtipendula), and blue grama (Bouteloua gracilis). Broadleaf evergreen shrubs and dwarfed trees are common including shrub live oak (Quercus turbinella), gray oak (Quercus grisea), and hairy mountain mahogany (Cercocarpus breviflorus). Rosette succulents include beargrass (Nolina greenei), banana yucca (Yucca baccata), Navajo yucca (Yucca baileyi), and various cacti. Deciduous shrubs include threeleaf sumac (Rhus trilobata) and wafer ash (Ptelea trifoliata). Some plants of Chihuahuan Desert affinities are found in this area, including oreganillo (Aloysia wrightii), mariola (Parthenium incanum), desert marigold (Baileya spp.), and a few subspecies of the often-numerous Engelmann prickly pear (Opuntia engelmannii).

From 7,200 to 7,800 ft (2,200 to 2,400 m), in the Transition Zone, Ponderosa Pine dominates, and evergreen oaks change to more cold-tolerant deciduous oaks. From 7,800 to 9,800 ft (2,400 to 3,000 m), a mixture of conifers occurs in the Canadian Zone; Gambel oak (Quercus gambelii) is at its upper natural range in this zone. Finally, from 9,800 ft (3,000 m) to the Sandia Crest at 10,678 ft (3,255 m), mostly on the eastern slopes, Engelmann spruce and white fir dominate the Hudsonian Zone.

On the eastern slopes of the Sandia Mountains, the life zones respond to a cooler climate than the western slopes, plus mostly limestone bedrock. Broadleaf evergreen plants, some succulents, and those with Chihuahuan Desert affinities are mostly absent, though other characteristics correspond to the same life zones on the western slope, except at slightly lower elevations. In the east slope's portion of the Upper Sonoran and Transition zones, alligator juniper (Juniperus deppeana) occurs, absent on the western slopes.

All zone boundary elevations are approximate, depending on microclimate or aspect of the land.

== Access and recreation ==
One can reach the top of the Sandias via two easy ways. The Sandia Peak Tramway ascends from the west side to a point on the crestline about 1.5 miles (2.4 km) south of Sandia Crest, at the top of the Sandia Peak Ski Area, which is located on the east side of the mountains. A road (NM 536) from the east provides access to the bottom of the ski area and also to the Sandia Crest itself, where there is a gift shop, restaurant, scenic overlook, and a large electronic communication site with numerous towers and antennas.

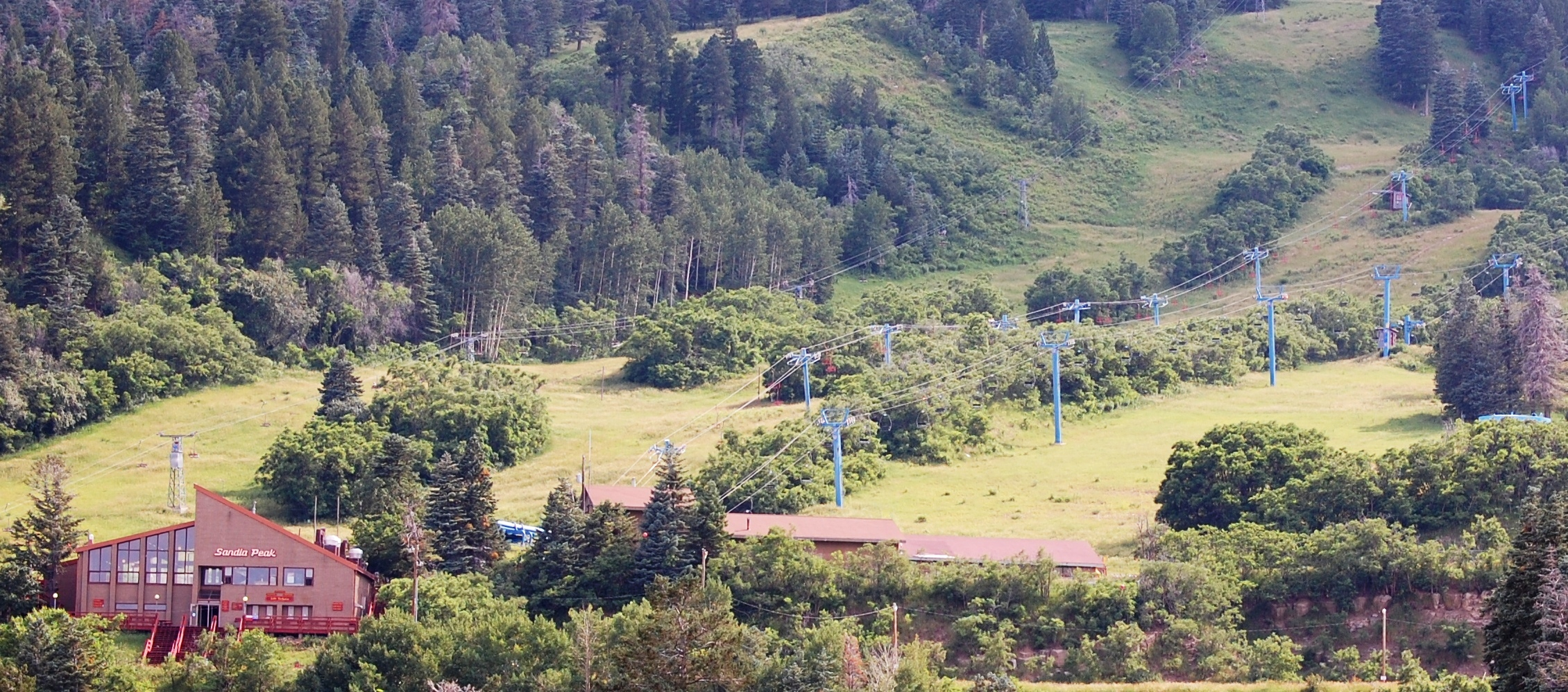
Sandia Peak Ski Area

The Sandia Crest Scenic Byway is also a popular path for motorcycle riders with its miles of winding road to the summit.

The Sandia Mountains are the most visited range in New Mexico. Numerous hiking trails exist on both sides of the range, such as the popular La Luz Trail and Crest Trail. Much of the west side of the range is included in the Sandia Mountain Wilderness; the trails on that side are steeper, and water is very scarce. Numerous picnic and recreation sites can be found on NM 536. These sites, along with some sites on the west face of the Sandias, require a $5 daily use/parking permit as part of the National Fee Program. No developed campgrounds currently exist in the Sandias.

The rock walls and pinnacles on the west side of the range provide abundant rock climbing opportunities, from bouldering and top-roping to multi-day big wall climbs on the Shield, the largest rock feature on the mountain. However, the long hikes (often off-trail) required to reach many of the climbs, and the variable quality of rock (often poor), prevent the Sandias from being a major climbing destination.

Both Sandia Peak and Sandia Crest are popular launching sites for recreational hang gliding due to the sheer drop-offs to the west. Launches at the Peak occur throughout the summer.

Walking the entire spine of the Sandia Mountains is possible, a 26-mile hike with over 4,000 feet in elevation gain.

=== Incidents ===
Hikers and climbers are urged to use caution when visiting the Sandias, where fatal accidents are not unknown and search and rescue operations are commonplace.

- In 1996, three climbers, Carlos Abad, Jane Tennessen and Glen Tietgen died after they fell 816 feet while ascending Warpy Moople, a climb up Muralla Grande in the Sandias.
- In 2015, the Sandias reported four deaths. 17 year-old Maya Spencer slipped on ice and fell to her death off a cliff in March, and 24-year old Brittany Johnson was fatally injured near the park's parking lot in May. In September, 40-year old hiker Bryan Conkling was found dead while becoming lost on La Luz trail. Later that month, a 70-year old man died when going missing while hiking.
- In 2016, 26-year old hiker Deidre Tafoya fell over 40 feet off a cliff while hiking in the Sandias with family. She was fatally injured.
- In 2019, experienced climber Garon Coriz was fatally injured when he fell over 50 meters while rappelling in the Sandia Mountains.
- In 2020, 40-year old hiker Gilbran Hernandez-Avila was found dead after failing to return while hiking in the Sandia Mountains.
- In 2021, 20-year old hiker Brandon Foster was found dead after accidentally straying from the La Luz trail.
- In 2024, three hikers were seriously injured by a falling boulder while hiking the Embudo Canyon Trailhead.

== History ==
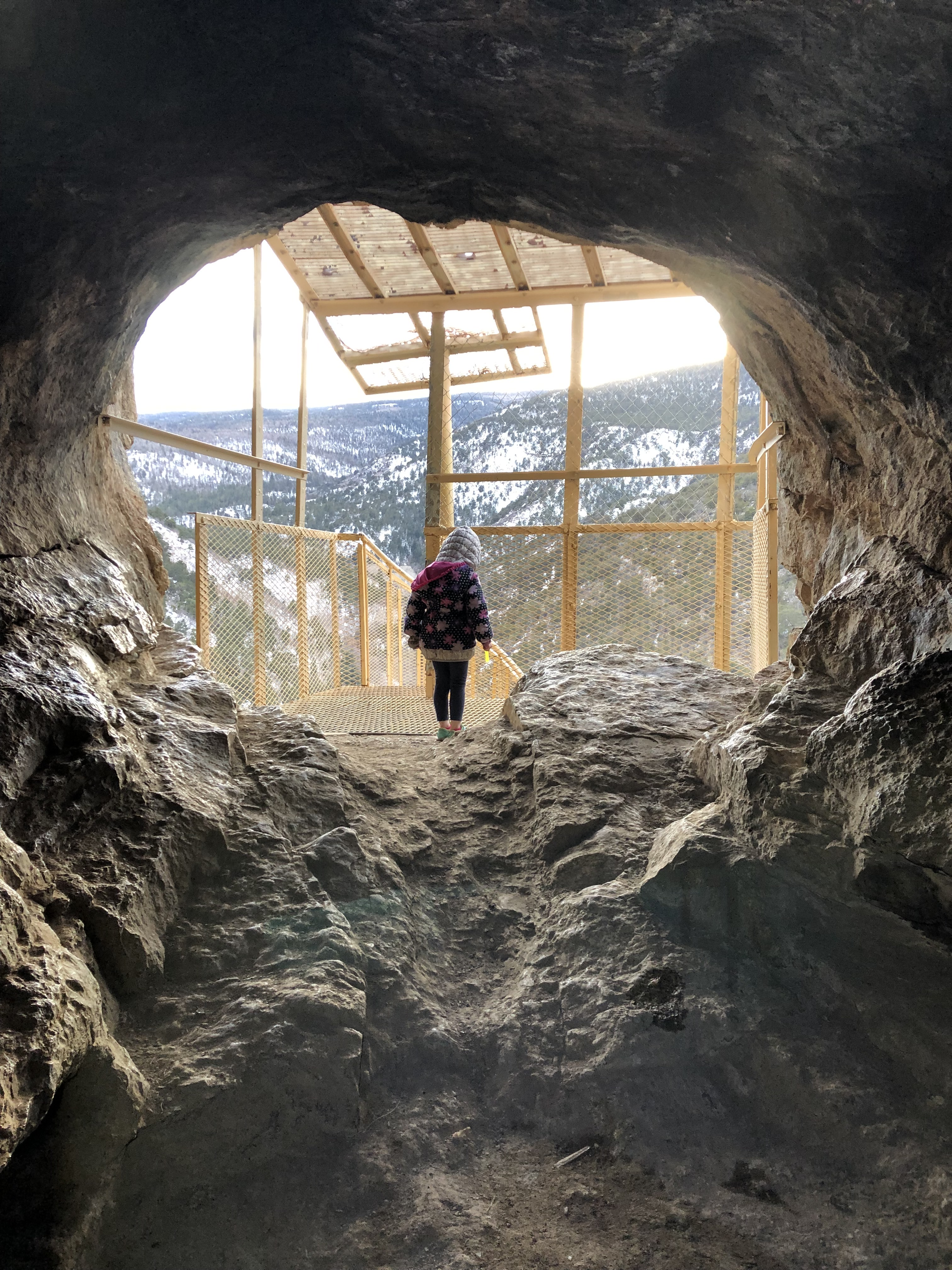
Sandia Cave

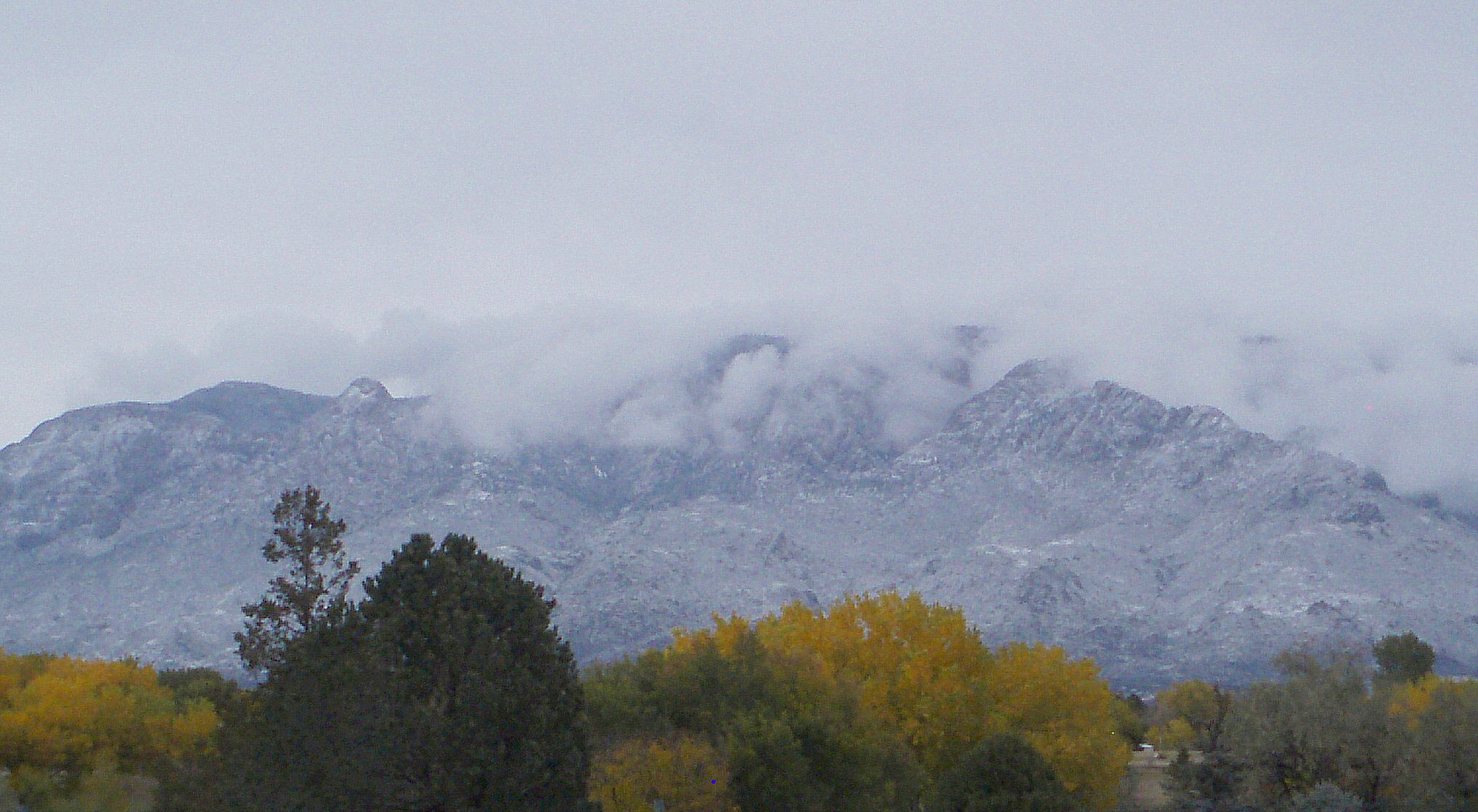
Early snow on the Sandias, October 28, 2009

The Sandias contain a location notable for prehistoric archaeology: the Sandia Cave was believed by some in the 1930s to the 1950s to have been inhabited 10000 to 12000 years ago by the "Sandia Man," a cultural classification that is no longer used. The cave can be accessed via a 1/2 mile trail in Las Huertas Canyon, on the northeast side of the range, near Placitas, New Mexico.

Ancestral and early Pueblo peoples have lived in the Sandia Mountains area for thousands of years. Examples of previous Pueblo settlements, now unoccupied, include Tijeras Pueblo and Pa'ako Pueblo, both founded around 700 years ago. Sandia Pueblo is a modern pueblo, abutting the Sandia Mountains on the northwest side of the range. Some of the foothills of the range are on Sandia Pueblo land; there have been disputes in the past between the Pueblo, the Forest Service, and private landowners over rights to various parts of the range. The people of Sandia Pueblo consider the mountains a sacred place.

In 1970, the hippie community of Tawapa was established near the Sandia Mountains. However, in the 1990s Tawapa ceased to exist.

== See also ==
- TWA Flight 260, 1955 flight that crashed into the Sandia Mountains
- Manzano Mountains
- List of mountains of the United States
