= Sandia Pueblo Settlement Technical Amendment Act =

United States federal public land legislation

- Long title: To make a technical amendment to the T’uf Shur Bien Preservation Trust Area Act, and for other purposes.
- Announced in: the 113th United States Congress
- Sponsored by: Sen. Tom Udall (D, NM)
- Number of co-sponsors: 1

Citations
- Public law: Pub. L. 113–119 (text) (PDF)

Codification
- Acts affected: T’uf Shur Bien Preservation Trust Area Act
- U.S.C. sections affected: 16 U.S.C. § 539m–11
- Agencies affected: United States Department of the Interior

Legislative history
- Introduced in the Senate as S. 611 by Sen. Tom Udall (D, NM) on March 19, 2013; Committee consideration by United States Senate Committee on Indian Affairs; Passed the Senate on March 12, 2014 (unanimous consent); Passed the House on May 28, 2014 (voice vote)

The Sandia Pueblo Settlement Technical Amendment Act (S. 611; Pub. L. 113–119 (text) (PDF)) is a bill that would transfer to the Sandia Pueblo of New Mexico some land from the United States Forest Service, provided that land remains an "open space in its natural state." The bill is a technical corrections bill and is supposed to transfer 700 acres from the federal government to the Sandia Pueblo.

The bill passed in the United States Senate during the 113th United States Congress.

== Background ==
Sandia Pueblo /sænˈdiːə/ is a federally recognized tribe of Native American Pueblo people inhabiting a 101.114-square-kilometre (39.040 mi^{2}) reservation of the same name in the eastern Rio Grande Rift of central New Mexico. It is bounded by the city of Albuquerque to the south and by the foothills of the Sandia Mountains, a landform the people hold sacred and which was central to the traditional economy and remains important in the spiritual life of the community, to the east. A forested area known as the bosque surrounds the rest of the reservation, and serves as a source of firewood and wild game. A resident population of 4,414 was reported as of the 2000 census. Two communities located on its territory are Pueblo of Sandia Village and part (population 3,235) of the town of Bernalillo. A federally recognized tribe, Sandia Pueblo is one of 19 of New Mexico's Native American pueblos. The land that would be conveyed to the Sandia Pueblo is considered to have important spiritual and cultural meaning to the tribe.

== Provisions of the bill ==
This summary is based largely on the summary provided by the Congressional Research Service, a public domain source.

The Sandia Pueblo Settlement Technical Amendment Act would amend the T'uf Shur Bien Preservation Trust Area Act to require the Secretary of Agriculture, upon the receipt of certain consideration and at the request of the Sandia Pueblo of New Mexico and the Secretary of the Interior, to transfer certain National Forest land to the Secretary of the Interior to be held in trust for the Pueblo, provided a land exchange with the Pueblo required by that Act is not completed within 90 days of this Act's enactment.

The bill would require that National Forest land to be preserved as open space in its natural state.

The bill would also require the Pueblo to transfer to the Secretary, in exchange for such land, the Pueblo's La Luz tract and an amount equal to the difference between the value of: (1) the National Forest land as open space in its natural state, and (2) the La Luz tract and the compensation owed to the Pueblo by the Secretary for the right-of-way and conservation easement on its Piedra Lisa tract.

== Congressional Budget Office report ==
This summary is based largely on the summary provided by the Congressional Budget Office, as ordered reported by the Senate Committee on Indian Affairs on October 30, 2013. This is a public domain source.

S. 611 would require the Secretary of Agriculture to transfer certain lands in the Sandia Mountain Wilderness and Cibola National Forest in New Mexico to the United States Department of the Interior to be held in trust for the Pueblo of Sandia. In exchange for the specified National Forest lands, the legislation would require the Secretary of the Interior to transfer certain lands and easements held in trust for the Pueblo of Sandia to the Forest Service.

The Congressional Budget Office (CBO) estimates that implementing S. 611 would have no significant impact on the federal budget. Based on information provided by the Forest Service, CBO estimates that the cost of administering the land transfers would be minimal. Enacting S. 611 would not affect direct spending or revenues; therefore, pay-as-you-go procedures do not apply.

S. 611 contains no intergovernmental or private-sector mandates as defined in the Unfunded Mandates Reform Act and would benefit the Pueblo of Sandia.

== Procedural history ==
The Sandia Pueblo Settlement Technical Amendment Act was introduced into the United States Senate on March 19, 2013 by Sen. Tom Udall (D, NM). It was referred to the United States Senate Committee on Indian Affairs. It was reported on January 28, 2014 alongside Senate Report 113-136. The bill passed in the Senate on March 12, 2014 by unanimous consent. On May 28, 2014, the United States House of Representatives voted to pass the bill in a voice vote. On June 9, 2014, President Barack Obama signed the bill into law, becoming Pub. L. 113–119 (text) (PDF).

== See also ==
- List of bills in the 113th United States Congress
