= Picuris language =

Tiwa language spoken in New Mexico, US

Picuris
- Picurís
- Native to: United States
- Region: Picuris Pueblo, New Mexico
- Ethnicity: 230
- Native speakers: 225 (2007)
- Language family: Tanoan: Tiwa; Northern Tiwa; Picuris

Language codes
- ISO 639-3: (covered by Northern Tiwa twf)
- Glottolog: picu1248
- ELP: Picuris
- Linguasphere: 64-CAA-ab
- Picuris is classified as Vulnerable by the UNESCO Atlas of the World's Languages in Danger.

Picuris (also Picurís) is a language of the Northern Tiwa branch of Tanoan spoken in Picuris Pueblo, New Mexico.

== Classification ==
Picuris is partially mutually intelligible with Taos dialect, spoken at Taos Pueblo. It is slightly more distantly related to Southern Tiwa (spoken at Isleta Pueblo and Sandia Pueblo).

== Phonology ==
		Bilabial	Dental		Alveolar	Palatal	Velar		Glottal
		Bilabial	median	lateral	Alveolar	Palatal	median	labial	Glottal
Stop	voiced	(b)	(d)				(ɡ)		
Stop	voiceless	p	t			tʃ	k	kʷ	ʔ
Stop	aspirated	pʰ	tʰ						
Stop	ejective	pʼ	tʼ			tʃʼ	kʼ	(kʼʷ)	
Fricative				ɬ	s		x	xʷ	h
Nasal		m	n						
Approximant		w		l		j			
Flap					(ɾ)				

- The consonants /b, d, ɡ, ɾ/ are only found in recent Spanish loanwords.
- G. Trager (1942, 1943) analyzed Picuris as also having aspirated stops /pʰ, tʰ/, ejective stops /pʼ, tʼ, tʃʼ, kʼ/, and labialized /kʷ, kʼʷ, xʷ/. These are considered by F. Trager (1971) to be sequences of /ph, th/, /pʔ, tʔ, tʃʔ, kʔ/, and /kw, kʔw, xw/.
- Velar /x/ has strong frication.
- Stops /p, t, ʔ/ are unaspirated while /k/ may be slightly aspirated.
- The affricate /tʃ/ freely varies with a more forward articulation [tʃ~ts]: for example, F. Trager recorded the word /ˈtʃāˈxʌ̀nē/ "witch" with an initial [tʃ] but the related word /ˈtʃāˈxʌ́ˈɬāwēnē/ "witch chief" with initial [tsʲ].
- The sequence /kʔw/ is only found in a single word /kʔwìatʃéne/.
- Alveolar /n/ has an assimilated velar variant [ŋ] when it precedes labio-velar /w/.
- Nasal /m/ in a low-toned syllable is partially devoiced and denasalized [mp] before a glottal stop /ʔ/, as in /ˈʔʌ̀mʔēnē/ "chokecherry" which is phonetically [ˈʌ̀mpʔɛ̄nɛ̄].
- Fricative /ɬ/ freely varies between a lateral fricative and a median–lateral fricative sequence [ɬ~sɬ]
- Lateral /l/ is palatalized [lʲ] before the high front vowel /i/.
- Only the sonorants /m, n, l, w, j/ can occur in syllable coda position.

=== Vowels ===
Picuris has 6 vowels. Picuris also has nasalized counterparts for each vowel.

Oral Vowels
	Front	Back
High	i	u
Upper Mid	e	o
Lower Mid		ʌ
Low	a	

Nasal Vowels
	Front	Back
High	ĩ	ũ
Upper Mid	ẽ	õ
Lower Mid		ʌ̃
Low	ã	

Picuris has three degrees of stress: primary, secondary, and unstressed. Stress affects the phonetic length of syllable rimes (lengthening the vowel or the syllable-final sonorant consonant).

Additionally, there are three tones: high, mid, and low — the mid tone being the most frequent.

== Text ==
Two sentences with interlinear glosses:

ˌʔìˈʔīˌnẽ́ ˌpāˈʔāˌnẽ́ ˌtāˈʔāˌnẽ́ ʔã̄nnã̄ˈpīaˌtʃí ˈmẽˌwíathā-ˌpʔīnˈwēlthā-ʔīˈkʔòˌthʌ̀
corn pumpkins beans we.two.will.make at.going.being-at.Picuris-we.good.dwell
"Corn, pumpkins, beans, we live happily at Picuris by raising an abundant crop."

ˈʔẽ́ kãˈxwẽ́ˌkì
you you.have.the.tail
"It's your turn."

== See also ==
- Picuris Pueblo
- Tiwa languages

== Bibliography ==
- Harrington, John P.; & Roberts, Helen. (1928). Picuris children's stories with texts and songs. Bureau of American Ethnology: Annual report, 43, 289-447.
- Nichols, Lynn. (1994). Vowel copy and stress in Northern Tiwa (Picurís and Taos). In S. Epstein et al. (Eds.), Harvard working papers in linguistics (Vol. 4, pp. 133–140).
- Nichols, Lynn. (1995). Referential hierarchies and C-command in Picurís. In S. Epstein et al. (Eds.), Harvard working papers in linguistics (Vol. 45, pp. 76–92).
- Trager, Felicia. (1968). Picuris Pueblo, New Mexico: An ethnolinguistic "salvage" study. (Doctoral dissertation, State University of New York, Buffalo, NY).
- Trager, Felicia. (1971). The phonology of Picuris. International Journal of American Linguistics, 37, 29-33.
- Trager, Felicia. (1975). Morphemic change in Picuris: A case of culture contact? Studies in Linguistics, 25, 89-93.
- Trager, George L. (1942). The historical phonology of the Tiwa languages. Studies in Linguistics, 1 (5), 1-10.
- Trager, George L. (1943). The kinship and status terms of the Tiwa languages. American Anthropologist, 45 (1), 557-571.
- Trager, George L. (1969). Taos and Picuris: How long separated?. International Journal of American Linguistics, 35 (2), 180-182.
- Zaharlick, Ann Marie (Amy). (1975). Pronominal reference in Picurís. Studies in Linguistics, 25, 79-88.
- Zaharlick, Ann Marie (Amy). (1977). Picurís syntax. (Doctoral dissertation, American University).
- Zaharlick, Ann Marie (Amy). (1979). Picuris and English: Similarities and differences. In R. J. Rebert (Ed.), Language descriptions from Indian New Mexico (pp. 20–51). Albuquerque: The University of New Mexico, American Indian Bilingual Education Center, pp.
- Zaharlick, Ann Marie (Amy). (1980). An outline of Picuris syntax. Annals of the New York Academy of Sciences, 345, 147-163.
- Zaharlick, Ann Marie (Amy). (1981). A preliminary examination of tone in Picuris. Special Issue: Native Languages of the Americas. Journal of the Linguistic Association of the Southwest, 4 (2), 123-129.
- Zaharlick, Ann Marie (Amy). (1982). Tanoan studies: Passive sentences in Picuris. Ohio State University Working Papers in Linguistics, 26, 34-48.
