= Piro Pueblo language =

Extinct Tanoan language of New Mexico, US

Piro
- Native to: United States
- Region: New Mexico
- Ethnicity: Piro
- Extinct: 1900s
- Language family: Tanoan: Tiwa; Piro

Language codes
- ISO 639-3: pie
- Glottolog: piro1248
- Linguasphere: 64-CAA-c

Piro is an extinct Tiwa dialect of the Tanoan languages once spoken in the more than twenty Piro Pueblos near Socorro, New Mexico.

== Classification ==
Piro has generally been classified as one of the Tiwa languages, though Leap (1971) contested whether or not Piro is truly a Tanoan language at all. The last known speaker, an elderly woman, was interviewed by Mooney in 1897, and by 1909 all Piro members had Mexican Spanish as their native language.

== Corpus ==
The corpus of Piro is limited to place names, two vocabularies and an 1860 translation of the Lord's Prayer using Spanish orthography:

Quitatác nasaul e yapolhua tol húy quiamgiana mi quiamnarinú Jaquié mu gilley nasamagui hikiey quiamsamaé, mukiataxám, hikiey, hiquiquiamo quia inaé, huskilley nafoleguey, gimoréy, y apol y ahuleý, quialiey, nasan e pomo llekeý, quiale mahimnague yo sé mahi kaná rrohoý, se teman quiennatehui mu killey, nani, emolley quinaroy zetasi, na san quianatehueý pemcihipompo y, qui solakuey quifollohipuca. Kuey maihua atellan, folliquitey. Amen.

The Piro-origin place names listed by Bandelier are Abo, Arti-puy, Genobey, Pataotry, Pil-abó, Qual-a-cú, Quelotetrey, Tabirá (Gran Quivira), Ten-abó, Tey-pam-á, Trenaquel and Zen-ecú (Senecú).

== Vocabulary ==
As Piro was morphologically agglutinative, words were built from prefixes, stems and suffixes. For example, quen-lo-a-tu-ya-é ("mosquito") is glossed as "the insect that bites".

Piro was reportedly mutually intelligible with Isleta with many shared words and case stems. Of the 180 words in Bartlett's Piro vocabulary, 87% were identical or nearly so to their corresponding stems in Southern Tiwa. The vocabulary created by Harrington also contains several loanwords from Spanish, such as pipa-hem for "pipe" (from Spanish pipa).

== External Resources ==
- 1894-7 Field Notes by James Mooney
