= Julyan =

Julyan is a surname and a given name. Notable people with the name include:

== Surname ==
- Bob Julyan, American author
- David Julyan, English musician and score composer

== Given name ==
- Julyan Cartwright, British physicist working in Spain
- Julyan Holmes, Cornish scholar and poet
- Julyan Sinclair, Orcadian television and radio presenter
- Julyan Stone, American professional basketball player

== See also ==
- Julian (given name)
- Julian (surname)
