= Bob Julyan =

American writer

- Born: Robert Hixson
- Writing career
- Genre: Non-fiction

Robert Hixson Julyan, usually referred to as Bob Julyan, is an American author of non-fiction residing in North-Central New Mexico. He changed his surname to Julyan due to not feeling a personal connection to Hixson, his stepfather's surname. He discusses the Sandia Mountain Wilderness in KNME-TV's presentation The Sandias about the eponymous mountain range.

== Books ==
Robert Hixson Julyan bibliography
- Books↙: The Place Names of New Mexico, Field Guide to the Sandia Mountains, The Mountains of New Mexico, Best Hikes with Children in New Mexico

- The Place Names of New Mexico
- Field Guide to the Sandia Mountains
- The Mountains of New Mexico
- Best Hikes with Children in New Mexico
