= Taos language =

Northern Tiwa dialect spoken in Taos Pueblo, New Mexico

Taos
- Native to: United States
- Region: Taos Pueblo, New Mexico
- Ethnicity: 1,600 (2007)
- Native speakers: 800 (2007)
- Language family: Tanoan: Tiwa; Northern Tiwa; Taos

Language codes
- ISO 639-3: twf (Northern Tiwa)
- Glottolog: nort1550 Taos Northern Tiwa
- ELP: Taos
- Linguasphere: 64-CAA-a
- Location of city of Taos ("Taos village") in Taos County New Mexico. Taos Pueblo is about two miles north of the city of Taos.

- Taos is classified as Definitely Endangered by the UNESCO Atlas of the World's Languages in Danger.

Taos is a language of the Tiwa branch of the Tanoan language family and is mainly spoken in the unincorporated community of Taos Pueblo and the city of Taos, both of them being in New Mexico.

== Sociolinguistics ==
In data collected in 1935 and 1937, George L. Trager (1946) notes that Taos was spoken by all members of the Taos Pueblo community. Additionally, most speakers were bilingual in either Spanish or English: speakers over 50 years of age were fluent in Spanish, adult speakers younger than 50 spoke Spanish and English, children around 5 years old could speak English but not Spanish—generally a decrease in age correlated with a decrease in Spanish fluency and an increase in English fluency. Pre-school children and a few very old women were monolingual Taos speakers.

A more recent report by Gomez (2003) notes that the language "until a few years ago remained viable only in age groups of thirty and older", a sign that Taos is being affected by language endangerment pressures. Nonetheless, it is one of 46 languages in North America that are being spoken by significant numbers of children as of 1995 (Goddard 1996). The most recent estimate is from 1980 with about 800 native speakers out of 1600 ethnic population (50% of the population).

Taos speakers have historically been reluctant to provide linguists with language data to work with and have preferred to keep their language secret from outsiders. G. Trager had to work with his consultants in private and keep their identities in confidence. The tendency for secrecy is a continuing general Pueblo reaction starting in the 17th century in large part due to the oppressive persecution (including public executions and torture) of Pueblo religious practices by the colonial Spanish. The Taos community has been particularly guarded about revealing their language (and culture) to outsiders when compared with other eastern pueblos in New Mexico. Due to secrecy practices, the details of language preservation are not known outside of the community.

== Language variation ==
George L. Trager found no dialectal variation in the 1930 and 1940s.

== Genealogical relations ==
Taos belongs to a northern sub-grouping on the Tiwa branch of the Tanoan language family. It is closely related to and partly mutually intelligible with Picurís (spoken at Picuris Pueblo). It is slightly more distantly related to Southern Tiwa (spoken at Isleta Pueblo and Sandia Pueblo).

== History ==
In 1994, the Taos High school stopped teaching the language after the Pueblo Council objected to the language being taught.

In July 2012, Taos Pueblo, which "does not formally encourage persons outside the tribe to learn their language", hosted a Tiwa Language Festival for tribal members to keep Tiwa from "going to sleep". The Cultural Education Committee hoped to incorporate the Tiwa language into Head Start in the fall.

In 2019, the Tiwa language of Taos Pueblo is taught at Enos Garcia Elementary.

== Phonology ==
According to one analysis, Taos has 18 consonants:

| | | Bilabial | Dental | | Alveolar | Palatal | Velar | Glottal |
| | | Bilabial | median | lateral | Alveolar | Palatal | Velar | Glottal |
|---|---|---|---|---|---|---|---|---|
| Plosive | voiced | b | d | | | | ɡ | |
| Plosive | voiceless | p | t | | | | k | ʔ |
| Affricate | | | | | | tʃ | | |
| Fricative | | | | ɬ | s | | x | h |
| Nasal | | m | n | | | | | |
| Approximant | | w | | l | | j | | |
| Flap | | | | | (ɾ) | | | |

The alveolar flap /ɾ/ is found in loanwords from New Mexican Spanish.

Taos has six vowels—five of these have an oral-nasal contrast. Taos has five (native) vowel clusters (i.e. diphthongs).

Oral Vowels
| | Front | | Back | |
| | oral | nasal | oral | nasal |
|---|---|---|---|---|
| High | i | į [ĩ] | u | ų [ũ] |
| Mid | e [ɛ] | ę [æ̃] | ə [ɤ] | |
| Low | a [æ] | ą [ã] | o [ɑ] | ǫ [ɔ̃] |

Vowel clusters
| | Final component | | | |
| Initial component | e | ę | a | o |
|---|---|---|---|---|
| i | ie [iɛ] | – | ia [iæ] | – |
| į | – | įę [ĩæ̃] | – | – |
| u | – | – | – | uo [uɒ] |
| ə | – | – | – | əo [ɤɜ] |

Taos has three degrees of stress: primary, secondary, and unstressed, as well as three tones: high, mid, and low.

=== Transcription ===
Taos has been transcribed by Trager in Americanist phonetic notation. However, his transcription differs between his earlier work exemplified by Trager (1946) and his later work following and explained in Trager (1948). The following chart lists the symbolization of Taos phonemes in Trager (1946) and Trager (1948) and also a corresponding IPA symbolization. However, the chart only lists symbols that differ between the three—if Trager (1946), Trager (1948), and the IPA all use the same symbol it is not listed in the chart below.

| Trager 1946 | Trager 1948 | IPA |
|---|---|---|
| ʔ | ’ | ʔ |
| c | c | tʃ ~ ts |
| c’ | c’ | tʃʼ ~ tsʼ (1946), tʃʔ ~ tsʔ (1948) |
| fr | phr | fɾ ~ ɸɾ |
| g | g | ɡ |
| k’ | k’ | kʼ (1946), kʔ |
| k_{w} | kw | kʷ (1946), kw (1948) |
| k_{w}’ | kw’ | kʷʼ (1946), kwʔ (1948) |
| ł | ł | ɬ |
| p’ | p’ | pʼ (1946), pʔ (1948) |
| p‛ | ph | pʰ (1946), ph (1948) |
| r | r | ɾ |
| s | s | s ~ ʃ |
| t’ | t’ | tʼ (1946), tʔ (1948) |
| t‛ | th | tʰ (1946), th (1948) |
| x_{w} | xw | xʷ (1946), xw (1948) |
| y | y | j |

Both Trager (1946) and Trager (1948) use the same vowel symbolization. This symbols have roughly approximate values of corresponding IPA symbols except that the vowel transcribed as ⟨o⟩ by Trager is phonetically IPA [ɑ] and in Trager's phonemic categorizing a low back vowel (with rounding details irrelevant to the categorization).

More different is Trager's two ways of transcribing tone and stress. The table below shows the differences on the syllable ta.

| Stress + Tone combination | Trager 1946 | Trager 1948 | IPA |
|---|---|---|---|
| primary stress + mid tone | tˈa | tá | ˈtā |
| secondary stress + mid tone | tˌa | tà | ˌtā |
| primary stress + high tone | tá | ta̋ | ˈtá |
| secondary stress + high tone | tá | tǎ | ˌtá |
| primary stress + low tone | tà | tâ | ˈtà |
| secondary stress + low tone | tà | tȁ | ˌtà |
| unstressed | ta | ta | ta |

The conflation between primary + high and secondary + high as well as primary + low and secondary + low in Trager (1946) was due to the belief that they were in complementary distribution. Trager rescinded this view in Trager (1948) and onward. In Trager's terminology, primary stress is called "loud" stress, secondary stress is "normal", and unstressed is "weak".

The orthography used in this article is essentially that of Trager (1948) with one modification: Trager (1948: 158) mentioned that the glottal stop ’ was not written when word-initial in the practical orthography he was teaching his informants—this practice is followed here.

== Grammar ==
=== Nouns ===
Taos nouns are inflected according to grammatical number with the number suffixes. Additionally, they may be inflected for possession with prefixes that indicate the number and grammatical person of the possessor as well as agreeing with the number of noun stem.

==== Number inflection ====
Nouns are generally composed of a noun stem with a following number suffix. The number suffixes distinguish between singular and plural. However, in verbs, three numbers are distinguished—singular, dual, and plural—because of this distinction in verbs the plural suffixes on nouns are more appropriately duoplural (Trager uses the term "nonsingular"). The singular suffix is ‑na and the duoplural suffix is ‑ne.

Two other number suffixes ‑ną and ‑nemą can express either singular number or duoplural depending upon the grammatical class of noun. For example, the noun stem cupa‑ "judge" is duoplural with the addition of ‑ną: cùpáną "judges". On the other hand, the noun stem t’awa‑ "wheel" is singular with the addition of ‑ną: t’áwaną "wheel". Examples with ‑nemą include ká‑nemą "mothers" (duoplural) and cí‑nemą "eye" (singular). Following the terminology used for other Tanoan languages, these will be called here "inverse" number suffixes. These inverse suffixes effectively indicate the grammatical number opposite the other suffix that appears on a given noun. Thus, since the stem p’iane‑ "mountain" requires the plural suffix ‑ne in the duoplural form (namely, p’íane‑ne "mountains"), the inverse ‑nemą marks the singular in p’íane‑nemą "mountain". And, likewise, since the stem cibiki‑ "robin" requires the singular suffix ‑na in the singular form (namely, cìbikí‑na "robin"), the inverse ‑ną marks the duoplural in cìbíki‑ną "robins".

===== Number classes =====
Taos nouns can be grouped into four grammatical classes based on which number affixes are required for the singular and duoplural inflectional forms. Trager calls these noun classes "genders". One class requires the singular suffix ‑na in the singular form and an inverse suffix in the duoplural. Another class requires an inverse suffix in the singular and the duoplural suffix ‑ne in the duoplural. A third class requires the singular and duoplural suffixes for the singular and duoplural forms, respectively. A fourth class only occurs with the duoplural suffix ‑ne. The first two classes, which use an inverse suffix, can be separated into two subclasses based on whether inverse ‑ną or ‑nemą is used. These are summarized in the following table.

| Class | Singular | Duoplural | Examples |
|---|---|---|---|
| I | ‑na | ‑ną | (cupa‑) cùpána "judge", cùpáną "judges" (kayu‑) kàyúna "maternal aunt", káyuną "maternal aunts" |
| I | ‑na | ‑nemą | (ka‑) kána "mother", kánemą "mothers" (t’oy‑) t’óyna "person", t’óynemą "persons" |
| II | ‑ną | ‑ne | (tawa‑) t’áwaną "wheel", t’áwane "wheels" (ciatu‑) cìatúną "legging", cìatúne "leggings" |
| II | ‑nemą | ‑ne | (ci‑) cínemą "eye", cíne "eyes" (xo‑) xónemą "arm", xóne "arms" |
| III | ‑na | ‑ne | (pululu‑) pùlulúna "plum", pùlulúne "plums" (kwo‑) kwóna "axe", kwóne "axes" |
| IV | ‑ne | | (c’o‑) c’óne "liver" (kopha‑) kopháne "coffee" |

Noun class I is composed of primarily animate nouns. The animate nouns include persons, animals, and kinship terms. Two non-animate nouns in the class are c’ìpána "doll" and p’ȍxwíana "egg". The class includes both native words and loanwords from Spanish (such as yàwo’óna "mare" from yegua, and prìmu’úna "cousin" from primo). Membership of this class is represented by the following list of nouns (cited in the singular form). The first list uses the ‑ną inverse suffix in the duoplural.

| àłu’úna "paternal grandmother" | c’ìpána "doll" | c’ȕnéna "coyote" |
| c’ùwala’ána "squirrel" | cìbikína "robin" | cìwyu’úna "bird" |
| cìyúna "mouse" | cùlo’óna "dog" | cùpána "judge" |
| ə̀wyu’úna "boy" | hȕolóna "quail" | gòyu’úna "rooster" (loan) |
| į̀ęmę’éna "paternal aunt" | k’òwa’ána "relative" | k’ùo’ȕ’úna "lamb" |
| kàyúna "maternal aunt" | kìłu’úna "nephew, niece" | kòlno’óna "badger" |
| kòsi’ína "cow" | kòw’ȕ’úna "colt" | kóywona "Kiowa Indian" (loan) |
| kùci’ína "pig" (loan) | kumàyli’ína "godmother" (loan) | kumpàyli’ína "godfather" (loan) |
| kùylulúna "skunk" | kw’àyána "magpie" | láyna "king" (loan) |
| lìlúna "chicken" | łìtúna "maternal grandmother" | mą́kuna "grandchild" |
| mèstu’úna "teacher" (loan) | mį̏mína "maternal uncle" | mùlo’óna "mule" (loan) |
| mùldu’úna "donkey" (loan) | mùoya’ána "ox" (loan) | mų̀si’ína "cat" |
| nábahuna "Navajo Indian" (loan) | nòdu’úna "soldier" (loan) | oxènti’ína "agent" (loan) |
| p’àyu’úna "younger sister" | p’ȍ’ǫ́yona "spider" | p’ȍwàya’ána "worm" |
| p’ȍxwíana "egg" | p’óyona "beaver" | p’ǫ́yna "younger brother" |
| pènku’úna "orphan" | pę̀cu’úna "rattlesnake" | phìayána "louse, flea" |
| phonsáyna "white man" (loan) | phų̀yu’úna "fly" | pòpóna "older brother" |
| prìmu’úna "cousin" (loan) | sayénuna "Cheyenne Indian" (loan) | sə̀oyi’ína "daughter-in-law" |
| t’òyłóna "giant" | tà’ána "son-in-law" | tàłułi’ína "grandfather" |
| tòbúna "governor of pueblo" | tràmpi’ína "tramp" (loan) | tȕculóna "hummingbird" |
| tùlu’úna "bull" (loan) | tų̀łu’úna "paternal uncle" | tùtúna "older sister" |
| tùxwána "fox" | ȕłęłę’éna "youth" | upę̀yu’úna "girl" |
yàwo’óna "mare" (loan)

The following belong to noun class I with the ‑nemą inverse suffix.

| c’ȁwéna "bluejay" | cíwena "eagle" | kána "mother" |
| kə́ona "bear" | kòléna "wolf" | kònéna "buffalo" |
| kǫ̏wéna "owl" | kwę́na "Mexican" | kwə́lena "maiden" |
| kwíanena "bitch" | łȉwéna "woman" | łùłi’ína "old man" |
| p’į́wna "sparrow" | pę́na "deer" | pə̏’ə́na "fish" |
| phȉwéna "daughter" | pȉwéna "rabbit" | pulísena "policeman" (loan) |
| púyena "friend" | sə́onena "man" | sȕléna "bluebird" |
| t’óyna "person" | tǫ̏ména "father" | ȕp’iléna "baby" |
ȕ’úna "son"

Nouns in classes II and III are opposed to class I in that they are inanimates. However, there is no apparent semantic motivation for distinguishing the types of nouns with membership in class II and class III. Both classes include body parts, plants, natural phenomena, and man-made materials. Loanwords are incorporated into both classes. Examples of nouns in class II follow. Those with the ‑ną inverse suffix are below.

| bósuną "glass tumbler" (loan) | butéyoną "bottle" (loan) | bútoną "boot" (loan) |
| cìatúną "legging" | hálgoną "rug" (loan) | hǫ́luną "lung" |
| hų́łoliną "weapon" | hų̏p’ôhaną "juniper" | íałoną "willow" |
| į̂ęthuną "ladder" | kwę́łoną "oak" | kwíltoną "quilt" (loan) |
| łòmų́ną "mouth" | łòwatúną "chief's cane" | łòxwóloną "window" |
| mą̂nmųną "glove" | mę́dianą "stocking" (loan) | mę́soną "table" (loan) |
| p’ȍk’úowoną "fir" | pisóloną "blanket" (loan) | púeloną "frying pan" (loan) |
| sédoną "silk" (loan) | t’áwaną "wheel" | túłoną "tree" |
| tų́łęną "birch" | tûoyoną "towel" (loan) | úliną "rubber (object)" (loan) |
| xų̀p’íną "knee" | yúwolaną "skirt" |

Examples of nouns in class II with the ‑nemą inverse suffix are below.

| cínemą "eye" | ę́nemą "shoulder" | hų̂nemą "cedar" |
| į̏ęnénemą "foot" | k’ə́onemą "neck" | kə̏dénemą "door" |
| kə̀nénemą "cradle" | kə̀obénemą "shoe" | kínemą "blanket" |
| mą̏nénemą "hand" | ȍdénemą "chin" | p’íanenemą "mountain" |
| p’ínemą "head" | phùolénemą "yucca" | piakə̀nénemą "chest" |
| pȍbénemą "flower" | telędúnenemą "fork" (loan) | wę̀’énemą "pine" |
| wǫ́nemą "wind" | xomúnenemą "ham" (loan) | xónemą "arm" |
| xų́nemą "leg" | yò’ónemą "song" |

Examples of noun in class III are the following:

| bòyi’ína "valley" (loan) | belísena "suitcase" (loan) | bùtúnena "button" (loan) |
| c’únena "deerhide strip" | c’òwowo’óna "ankle" | cą̀pienéna "yeast" |
| cȅdéna "anus" | cìakǫ’óna "question" | cûdena "shirt" |
| ə̂bena "cherry" | kàsu’úna "cheese" (loan) | kàyi’ína "street" (loan) |
| kayúnena "canyon" (loan) | kèke’éna "cake" (loan) | kə́na "vulva" |
| komòlto’óna "bed frame" (loan) | kòmpu’úna "camp" (loan) | kòwmą̏celéna "hoof" |
| kùli’ína "cabbage" (loan) | kùti’ína "coat" (loan) | kwę̀xòci’ína "bracelet" |
| kwìawìp’į́ęna "racetrack" | kwóna "axe" | kwę̀mų́na "carpenter's apron" |
| láyna "law" (loan) | lílena "belt" | lìmunéna "lemon" (loan) |
| łòxóyna "lip" | łúna "buckskin" | mą̏c’élena "fingernail" |
| mąkìno’óna "machine" (loan) | mę̀diaxų̀ci’ína "garter" | mę̀so’óna "(Catholic) mass" (loan) |
| mę̀sotu’úna "church" (loan) | mį̀yo’óna "mile" (loan) | moltìyu’úna "hammer" (loan) |
| monsònu’úna "appletree" (loan) | mùlso’óna "pocket" (loan) | mųstúnena "button" (loan) |
| ną̀xù’úna "adobe brick" | p’ȍkúna "bread" | p’óna "moon" |
| p’ȍpə́na "sky" | p’ȍtukw’ilóna "mint" | p’ȍxəłóna "star" |
| pànąthóna "underwear" | pèro’óna "pear" (loan) | phę́na "cloud" |
| phə́yna "nose" | phò’ína "peach" (loan) | phóna "hair" |
| píana "heart" | pį̏ę’éna "bed" | pį́ęna "road" |
| plòso’óna "city" (loan) | pòmų́na "trousers" | póna "pumpkin" |
| pǫ̏’óna "land, country" | púlulúna "plum" | pùohóna "ball" |
| pùru’úna "cigar" (loan) | ràncu’úna "ranch" (loan) | rarą̀xu’úna "orange" (loan) |
| supòno’óna "bedspring" (loan) | t’àmų́na "cheek" | t’ółəona "ear" |
| tą́na "bean" | thį̀ę’éna "stomach" | thȕléna "sun" |
| tį̀ęndo’óna "store" (loan) | tìkiti’ína "ticket" (loan) | tomòli’ína "tamale" (loan) |
| tròki’ína "truck" (loan) | tumą̀ti’ína "tomato" (loan) | ùbo’óna "grape" (loan) |
| úyna "charcoal" (loan) | úypha’ána "burning coal" | wána "penis" |
xwílena "bow"

The final class IV consists of mostly abstract and deverbal nouns. All nouns in this class only are inflected with the duoplural. They may be semantically either singular or collective. Examples follow.

| adùbi’íne "adobe" (loan) | benę̀nu’úne "poison" (loan) | biną̀gre’éne "vinegar" (loan) |
| c’óne "liver" | cì’íne "knot" | cìli’íne "chili" (loan) |
| cìliłə̀’ə́ne "chili soup" | cìlithə̀o’óne "chili powder" | gosulínene "gasoline" (loan) |
| hə́olene "sickness" | ȉa’áne "corn" | į̀ękǫ́ne "hail" |
| kopháne "coffee" (loan) | kùku’úne "cocoa" (loan) | lecùgo’óne "lettuce" (loan) |
| łáne "tobacco" | łíne "grass" | łitǫ́ne "wheat" |
| łò’óne "wood" | łùléne "rain" | mùoli’íne "return" |
| ną̀méne "soil" | obènu’úne "oats" (loan) | p’ȍcíane "ice" |
| p’ȍxúone "steam" | p’ȍ’óne "water" | páne "clothing" |
| phà’áne "fire" | pòwdo’óne "baking powder" (loan) | sùdo’óne "baking soda" (loan) |
téne "tea" (loan)

Trager treats class III and IV as sub-classes of a larger single class.

The noun class system also applies to some other word types besides nouns. Demonstratives and some numerals are also inflected for number with different suffixes that agree with the noun that they modify.

===== Connecting -e- =====
When some stems are followed by the number suffixes, they are followed by a connecting ‑e‑ vowel. For example, the word "flower" consists of a stem pob‑ and in the inflected forms the intervening vowel appears: pȍb‑é‑nemą "flower". Other examples include ȍd‑é‑nemą "chin, jaw", kwían‑e‑na "bitch", łȉw‑é‑na "woman". However, not all instances of e vowels occurring directly before number suffixes are this intervening vowel as there also some stems which end in a e vowel, such as c’ȕné‑na "coyote" which has the stem c’ùne‑.

===== Reduplication =====
Several noun stem have reduplicated stem material appearing between the stem and the number suffix. For example, kò’óne "washing" consists of the stem ko‑ and the duoplural number suffix ‑ne. Between the stem and the suffix is the duplifix ‑’o‑. This duplifix consists of the consonant ’ and a copy of the final vowel of the stem ko‑. The duplifix may be symbolized as ‑’V‑ where V represents the reduplication of any vowel that occurs at the end of the preceding noun stem. Thus "washing" is ko‑’V‑ne, which after copying is ko‑’o‑ne. Other examples include

| cì‑’í‑ne | "knot" |
| cìwyu‑’ú‑na | "bird" |
| ȉa‑’á‑ne | "corn" |

Further details about the phonology of the reduplication are found in Taos phonology: Reduplicative vowel patterning.

The reduplication occurs in all four noun classes before the all number suffixes except inverse ‑ną (in both class I duoplural and class II singular). The following examples show the patterning of reduplication and number suffixes found by Trager.

| Singular | | Duoplural | | Noun class | Gloss |
|---|---|---|---|---|---|
| c’ìliyo‑’ó‑na | reduplication | c’íliyo‑ną | no reduplication | Class I | "bat" |
| ȕ‑’ú‑na | reduplication | ȕ‑’ú‑nemą | reduplication | Class I | "son" |
| yúwola‑ną | no reduplication | yùwola‑’á‑ne | reduplication | Class II | "skirt" |
| yò‑’ó‑nemą | reduplication | yò‑’ó‑ne | reduplication | Class II | "song" |
| kwę̀xòci‑’í‑na | reduplication | kwę̀xòci‑’í‑ne | reduplication | Class III | "bracelet" |
| mę̀sotu‑’ú‑na | reduplication | mę́sotu‑ne | no reduplication | Class III | "church" |

==== Vocatives ====
Noun stems of the nouns in class I can standalone as free words when they are used to refer to persons as proper nouns.

=== Verbs ===
==== Pronominal inflection ====
| | | Objects | | | | | | | | |
| | | First | | | Second | | | Third | | |
| | | Singular | Dual | Plural | Singular | Dual | Plural | Singular | Plural | Inverse |
|---|---|---|---|---|---|---|---|---|---|---|
| First | Singular | | | | ą- | mąpę-n- | mąpi- | ti- | o- | pi- |
| First | Dual | | | | ą- | mąpę-n- | mąpi- | ą-n- | ką-n- | ąpę-n- |
| First | Plural | | | | ą- | mąpę-n- | mąpi- | i- | kiw- | ipi- |
| Second | Singular | may- | | | | | | o- | ku- | i- |
| Second | Dual | may- | | | | | | mą-n- | mą-n- | mąpę-n- |
| Second | Plural | may- | | | | | | mą- | mąw- | mąpi- |
| Third | Singular | o- | ą-n- | i- | ą- | mą-n- | mą- | – | u- | i- |
| Third | Dual | o- | ą-n- | i- | ą- | mą-n- | mą- | ą-n- | ą-n- | ąpę-n- |
| Third | Plural | o- | ą-n- | i- | ą- | mą-n- | mą- | i- | iw- | ipi- |

== See also ==
- Taos phonology
- Category:Taos language on Wiktionary
- Taos Pueblo

== Bibliography ==
- de Angulo, Jaime. (1925). Taos kinship terminology. American Anthropologist, 27 (3), 482-483.
- Bodine, John J. (1968). Taos names: A clue to linguistic acculturation. Anthropological Linguistics, 10 (5), 23-27.
- Bodine, John J. (1979). Taos Pueblo. In A. Ortiz (Ed.), Handbook of North American Indians: Southwest (Vol. 9, pp. 255–267). Washington, D.C.: Smithsonian Institution.
- Eggan, Fred. (1979). Pueblos: Introduction. In A. Ortiz (Ed.), Handbook of North American Indians: Southwest (Vol. 9, pp. 224–235). Washington, D.C.: Smithsonian Institution.
- Goddard, Ives. (1999). Introduction. In I. Goddard (Ed.), Handbook of North American Indians: Languages (Vol. 17, pp. 1–16). Washington, D.C.: Smithsonian Institution.
- Gomez, Henrietta. (2003). Written testimony of Henrietta Gomez, Taos Pueblo Head Start Program Tiwa culture specialist and language instructor before the Senate Committee on Indian Affairs on the reauthorization of the Head Start Act and on Native American Indian language and culture. Online: indian.senate.gov/2003hrgs/092503hrg/gomez.PDF.
- Hall, Robert. (1947). A note on Taos k'owena 'horse'. International Journal of American Linguistics, 13 (2), 117–118.
- Harrington, J. P. (1909). Notes on the Piro language. American Anthropologist, 11 (4), 563–594.
- Harrington, J. P. (1910). An introductory paper on the Tiwa language, dialect of Taos. American Anthropologist, 12 (1), 11–48.
- Harrington, J. P. (1916). Ambiguity in the Taos personal pronoun. In Holmes anniversary volume (pp. 142–156). Washington: J.W. Bryan.
- Jones, William. (1960). Origin of the place name Taos. Anthropological Linguistics, 2 (3), 2–4.
- Mithun, Marianne. (1999). The languages of Native North America. Cambridge: Cambridge University Press. ISBN 0-521-23228-7 (hbk); ISBN 0-521-29875-X.
- Parsons, Elsie Clews. (1940). Taos tales. Memoirs of the American Folklore Society (Vol. 34). New York.
- Trager, Felicia. (1971). The phonology of Picuris. International Journal of American Linguistics, 37, 29–33.
- Trager, George L. (1936). ðə lɛŋgwiɟ əv ðə pweblow əv Taos (*nuw meksikow). [The language of the pueblo of Taos]. Maître Phonétique, 56, 59–62. JSTOR 44704883
- Trager, George L. (1939). The days of the week in the language of Taos Pueblo, New Mexico. Language, 15, 51–55.
- Trager, George L. (1940). Appendix. In E. C. Parsons, Taos tales. New York.
- Trager, George L. (1942). The historical phonology of the Tiwa languages. Studies in Linguistics, 1 (5), 1-10.
- Trager, George L. (1943). The kinship and status terms of the Tiwa languages. American Anthropologist, 45 (1), 557–571.
- Trager, George L. (1944). Spanish and English loanwords in Taos. International Journal of American Linguistics, 10 (4), 144–158.
- Trager, George L. (1946). An outline of Taos grammar. In C. Osgood (Ed.), Linguistic structures of native America (pp. 184–221). New York: Wenner-Green Foundation for Anthropological Research.
- Trager, George L. (1948). Taos I: A language revisited. International Journal of American Linguistics, 14 (3), 155–160.
- Trager, George L. (1954). Taos II: Pronominal reference. International Journal of American Linguistics, 20 (3), 173–180.
- Trager, George L. (1960). Taos III: Paralanguage. Anthropological Linguistics, 2 (2), 24–30.
- Trager, George L. (1960). The name of Taos, New Mexico. Anthropological Linguistics, 2 (3), 5–6.
- Trager, George L. (1961). Taos IV: Morphemics, syntax, semology in nouns and in pronominal reference. International Journal of American Linguistics, 27 (3), 211–222.
- Trager, George L. (1961). The typology of paralanguage. Anthropological Linguistics, 3 (1), 17–21.
- Trager, George L. (1969). Taos and Picuris: How long separated?. International Journal of American Linguistics, 35 (2), 180–182.
- Trager, George L.; & Trager, Felicia H. (1970). The cardinal directions at Taos and Picuris. Anthropological Linguistics, 12 (2), 31–37.
