= Southern Tiwa language =

North American aboriginal language

Southern Tiwa
- Native to: United States
- Region: New Mexico
- Ethnicity: Tiwa
- Native speakers: 1,600, mostly older adults (2007)
- Language family: Kiowa-Tanoan: Tanoan; Tiwa; Southern Tiwa
- Dialects: Isleta; Sandía; Tigua

Language codes
- ISO 639-3: tix
- Glottolog: sout2961
- ELP: Southern Tiwa
- Linguasphere: 64-CAA-b
- Southern Tiwa

- Southern Tiwa is classified as Definitely Endangered by the UNESCO Atlas of the World's Languages in Danger.

The Southern Tiwa language is a Tanoan language spoken at Sandia Pueblo and Isleta Pueblo in New Mexico and Ysleta del Sur in Texas.

== Classification ==
Southern Tiwa belongs to the Tiwa sub-grouping of the Kiowa–Tanoan language family. It is closely related to the more northernly Picurís (spoken at Picuris Pueblo) and Taos (spoken at Taos Pueblo). Trager stated that Southern Tiwa speakers were able to understand Taos and Picurís, although Taos and Picurís speakers could not understand Southern Tiwa very easily. Harrington (1910) observed that an Isleta person (Southern Tiwa) communicated in "Mexican jargon" with Taos speakers as Taos and Southern Tiwa were not mutually intelligible.

== Dialects ==
Southern Tiwa had three dialectal variants

1. Sandía
2. Isleta
3. Ysleta del Sur (Tigua)

Trager reported that Sandía and Isleta were very similar and mutually intelligible.

In August 2015, it was announced that the Tiwa language would be taught to children at Isleta Elementary School in Pueblo of Isleta, as a part of the school's transfer from federal to tribal control.

== Sound system ==
=== Consonants ===
Southern Tiwa has 29 consonants:

Consonants
		Labial	Dental	Alveolar		Palatal	Velar		Glottal	
		Labial	Dental	plain	lateral	Palatal	plain	lab.	plain	lab.
Plosive/ Affricate	voiced	b	d				ɡ			
Plosive/ Affricate	voiceless	p	t			tʃ	k	kʷ	ʔ	
Plosive/ Affricate	aspirated	pʰ	tʰ				kʰ			
Plosive/ Affricate	glottalized	pʼ	tʼ			tʃʼ	kʼ	kʼʷ		
Fricative		f		s	ɬ	ʃ			h	hʷ
Rhotic				ɾ						
Nasal		m	n							
Approximant					l	j		w		

Stops /pʰ, tʰ, kʰ/ and /b, d/ may be fricated in different positions as [f, θ, x] and [β, ð] respectively.
/ɾ/ can also be heard as a trill [r] and a retroflex [ɽ].

=== Vowels ===
Southern Tiwa has five vowels that have both an oral and nasal contrast.

Vowels
	Front		Central		Back	
	oral	nasal	oral	nasal	oral	nasal
High	i	ĩ	ɨ	ɨ̃	u	ũ
Mid	ɛ	ɛ̃				
Low					ɑ	ɑ̃

Sounds /i, ɨ, u, ɑ/ may also be heard as [ɪ, ɯ, ʊ, a].

Southern Tiwa has three tones: high, mid, and low.

=== Syllable structure ===
Southern Tiwa syllable structure is CV, where C is a consonant and V can be either a single oral or nasal vowel or diphthong. Diphthongs can be composed of any vowel quality and they have the same duration of a single vowel.

== Bibliography ==
- Allen, Barbara J. (1978). Goal advancement in Southern Tiwa. SIL working papers (No. 22). Summer Institute of Linguistics and University of North Dakota.
- Allen, Barbara J.; & Frantz, Donald G. (1978). Verb agreement in Southern Tiwa. In Proceedings of the fourth annual meeting of the Berkeley Linguistics Society (pp. 11–17).
- Allen, Barbara J.; & Frantz, Donald G. (1983). An impersonal passive in Southern Tiwa. SIL working papers (No. 25). Summer Institute of Linguistics and University of North Dakota.
- Allen, Barbara J.; Frantz, Donald G.; & Gardiner, Donna B. (1981). Phantom arcs in Southern Tiwa. SIL working papers (No. 27). Summer Institute of Linguistics and University of North Dakota.
- Allen, Barbara J.; & Gardiner, Donna B. (1981). Passive in Southern Tiwa. In Proceedings of the ninth annual Southwestern Areal Language and Linguistic Workshop.
- Allen, Barbara J.; Gardiner, Donna B.; & Frantz, Donald G. (1984). Noun incorporation in Southern Tiwa. International Journal of American Linguistics, 50 (3), 292-311.
- Brandt, Elizabeth. (1970). Sandia Pueblo, New Mexico: A linguistics and ethnolinguistic investigation. (Doctoral dissertation, Southern Methodist University).
- Brandt, Elizabeth. (1970). On the origins of linguistic stratification: The Sandia case. Anthropological Linguistics, 12 (2), 46-50.
- Gardiner, Donna. (1977). Embedded questions in Southern Tiwa. (Master's thesis, University of North Dakota).
- Gatschet, Albert. (1891). A mythic tale of the Isleta Indians, New Mexico. Proceedings of the American Philosophical Society, 29, 208-218.
- Harrington, J. P. (1909). Notes on the Piro language. American Anthropologist, 11 (4), 563-594.
- Leap, William L. (1970). The language of Isleta, New Mexico. (Doctoral dissertation, Southern Methodist University).
- Leap, William L. (1970). Tiwa noun class semology: A historical view. Anthropological Linguistics, 12 (2), 38-45.
- Lummis, C. (1910). Pueblo Indian folk stories. New York: The Century Co.
- Sutton, Logan D. (2014). Kiowa-Tanoan: A Synchronic and Diachronic Study. The University of New Mexico, Albuquerque.
- Trager, George L. (1942). The historical phonology of the Tiwa languages. Studies in Linguistics, 1 (5), 1-10.
- Trager, George L. (1943). The kinship and status terms of the Tiwa languages. American Anthropologist, 45 (1), 557-571.
- Trager, George L. (1946). An outline of Taos grammar. In C. Osgood (Ed.), Linguistic structures in North America (pp. 184–221). New York: Wenner-Green Foundation for Anthropological Research.
- Yumitani, Yukihiro. (1987). A Comparative Sketch of Pueblo Languages: Phonology, Kansas Working Papers in Linguistics, Vol. 12, 135-139.
