= Tiwa language (Americas) =

Language family in New Mexico, US

Tiwa
- Tigua
- Geographic distribution: 4 Pueblos throughout New Mexico, Arizona, Ysleta del Sur Pueblo in El Paso, Texas
- Ethnicity: Tiwa
- Linguistic classification: Tanoan: Tiwa
- Subdivisions: Southern; Northern (Taos–Picuris); Piro? †; Jumano? †

Language codes
- Glottolog: tiwa1255

Tiwa (/ˈtiːwə/ TEE-wə) (also E-nagh-magh, Spanish: Tigua) is the Tanoan language of the Tiwa people. There are two main dialects, a Northern dialect spoken at Taos Pueblo and Picuris Pueblo, and Southern dialect is spoken at Sandia Pueblo, Isleta Pueblo, and Ysleta del Sur Pueblo. Some scholars consider Picuris to have its own dialect, though it is largely mutually intelligible with the Taos dialect. Northern and Southern Tiwa are no longer mutually intelligible, but the Tiwa people still consider their language to be one unified language. The extinct dialect of Piro Pueblo was a southern Tiwan dialect, similar to the dialect of Isleta.

== Subfamily members and relations ==
Southern Tiwa is spoken in by around 1,600 people in Isleta Pueblo, Sandia Pueblo, and Ysleta del Sur Pueblo (Tigua Pueblo).

The remaining two languages form a subgrouping known as Northern Tiwa. Northern Tiwa consists of Taos spoken by 800 people in Taos Pueblo and Picuris spoken by around 220 people in Picuris Pueblo. It is not known whether the Piro Pueblo language was Tiwa as well.

== History ==
Both dialects of the Tiwa language originate from Taos Pueblo. After the Pueblo Revolt against the Spanish conquistadors in 1680, some of the Tigua and Piro peoples fled south with the Spanish to El Paso del Norte (present-day Ciudad Juárez, Mexico). There they founded Ysleta del Sur, Texas; Socorro, Texas; and Senecú del Sur, Mexico. Their descendants continued to live in these communities as late as 1996. Over time, Northern and Southern Tiwa became separate languages and Spanish or Comanche was used as a lingua franca when northern and southern Tiwa people interacted with one another. Today the Tiwa-speaking Pueblos still regard Tiwa as one unified language. The majority of Indigenous Taos continue to practice their ancient religion.

== See also ==
- Isleta Pueblo
- Picuris Pueblo
- Sandia Pueblo
- Taos Pueblo
- Ysleta del Sur Pueblo
- Jornada del Muerto
