= Tanoan languages =

Indigenous North American language family

Tanoan
- Kiowa–Tanoan
- Geographic distribution: central North America
- Native speakers: ~5,625
- Linguistic classification: One of the world's primary language families
- Subdivisions: Tiwa; Tewa; Towa; Kiowa

Language codes
- Glottolog: kiow1265
- Linguasphere: 64-C
- Distribution of Tanoan languages before European contact. The Pueblo languages are at the left; the nomadic Kiowa at right.

Tanoan (/təˈnoʊ.ən/ tə-NOH-ən), also Kiowa–Tanoan or Tanoan–Kiowa, is a family of languages spoken by indigenous peoples in present-day New Mexico, Kansas, Oklahoma, and Texas.

Historical distribution of Pueblo Tanoan languages

Current distribution of Pueblo Tanoan languages

Most of the languages – Tiwa (Taos, Picuris, Southern Tiwa), Tewa, and Towa – are spoken in the Native American Pueblos of New Mexico (with one outlier in Arizona). These were the first languages collectively given the name of Tanoan. Kiowa, which is a related language, is now spoken mostly in southwestern Oklahoma. The Kiowa historically inhabited areas of modern-day Texas and Oklahoma but originally inhabited western Montana before European contact.

== Name ==
In older texts, Tanoan and Kiowa–Tanoan were used interchangeably. Because of the cultural use of the name Tanoan as signifying several peoples who share a culture, the more explicit term Kiowa–Tanoan is now commonly used for the language family as a whole, with Tanoan being the branch that contains the languages now spoken in New Mexico and Arizona (i.e. Arizona Tewa).

== Development of the hypothesis ==
Tanoan has been recognized as a family of Pueblo languages since 1891, with the division of the family into Tiwa, Tewa, and Towa languages proposed by John Peabody Harrington in 1910. The traditionally nomadic Kiowa people of the Plains are culturally quite distinct from the agricultural Tiwa, Tewa, and Towa pueblos, which obscured somewhat the linguistic connection between Tanoans and the Kiowa. Harrington was the first to propose a Kiowa-Tanoan relationship in 1910, but it was not proven until 1967 when Kenneth L. Hale constructed a phonology of Proto-Kiowa-Tanoan. Linguists now accept that a Tanoan family without Kiowa would be paraphyletic.

A relationship between Tanoan and Uto-Aztecan, the Aztec–Tanoan languages, was first proposed by Edward Sapir in 1921 and enjoyed broad support for decades, but is now generally considered to be weakly supported and ascribed to language contact.

== Internal classification ==
The Tanoan language family has seven languages in four branches:

- Tanoan
  - Kiowa (Ǥáuiđòᵰ꞉gyà): 20 speakers
  - Jemez (or Towa): 1,800 speakers
  - Tiwa
    - Northern
      - Taos: 800 speakers
      - Picuris: 225 speakers
    - Southern Tiwa: 1,600 speakers
    - ? Piro †
  - Tewa: 1,600 speakers

Clades within the family are unsettled. Kiowa has often been taken as sister to the remaining "Tanoan" languages, within which Towa is sister to Tiwa-Tewa, but a variety of contending systems have been suggested. Rather than an early division into Kiowa and Tanoan George L. Trager proposed that Kiowa–Towa might form a clade. Tiwa and Tewa are often theorized to form a clade. Still other authors have concluded that the family consists of four coordinate branches without internal structure.

To explain the existence of phonological innovations across otherwise separate clades, Ortman proposes that the languages diverged following the traditional sequence of Kiowa first, followed by Towa and then Tewa, but that this process was gradual, with Kiowa only reaching isolation after the development of proto-Towa and Towa reaching isolation after the development of proto-Tewa. He suggests that the ancestral dialects were once arranged sequentially on the landscape, during which time innovations diffused between neighboring dialects without reaching fixation across the family. However, the absence of shared innovations between Tiwa and Tewa suggest a much more clean separation of the two following their isolation from Towa and Kiowa, perhaps due to migration.

Pecos, spoken at Pecos Pueblo, is an extinct Tanoan language traditionally assumed to be a dialect of Towa, but the surviving material is insufficient to demonstrate its identity, with some non-linguistic evidence instead suggesting a relationship with the southern Tewa.

== History ==
An analysis of reconstructed Kiowa-Tanoan cognates indicates that the language family's linguistic homeland was in an upland environment, most likely near the Rocky Mountains, and that the speakers were hunter-gatherers. Glottochronological analyses suggest Kiowa and Tanoan diverged between 4000+ and 3000 years ago, prior to the advent of agriculture in the Southwest, but this is contradicted by the presence of cognate agricultural terms in the descendant branches. Based on shared innovations, Ortman suggests a Late Archaic origin on the Colorado Plateau for proto-Kiowa-Tanoan which diversified as its speakers gradually adopted agriculture, singling out the Eastern Basketmaker II Culture of 50-450 CE as possible Kiowa-Tanoan ancestors. The same methods suggest that proto-Tanoan was spoken during the Basketmaker III period, with proto-Tiwa-Tewa separating during the Pueblo I period between 725 and 920 CE. Lastly, the consolidation of proto-Tiwa is identified with the Pueblo II period, in part due to the presence of cognates linked to the Chaco Canyon trade system.

Ortman proposes a gradual southeastern migration of Tanoan speakers from the San Juan River basin to the Rio Grande, beginning with the Tiwa between 920 and 980 CE. Under this model, the Towa had entered the Rio Puerco valley from southwest Utah by around 1200 CE, while the Tewa arrived to the Tewa Basin from Mesa Verde during the Pueblo III period around 1275 CE.

== Phonology ==
The chart below contains the consonants of the Tanoan proto-language as reconstructed by Hale (1967) based on consonant correspondences in stem-initial position.

		Labial	Apical	Apical Fricated	Velar	Velar Labial	Glottal
Plosive	voiced	*b	*d	*dz	(*ɡ)	*ɡʷ	
Plosive	plain	*p	*t	*ts	*k	*kʷ	
Plosive	glottalized	*pʼ	*tʼ	*tsʼ	*kʼ	*kʷʼ	*ʔ
Plosive	aspirated	*pʰ	*tʰ	*tsʰ	*kʰ	*kʷʰ	
Nasal		*m	*n				
Fricative				*s			*h
Glide						*w	

The evidence for *ɡ comes from prefixes; *ɡ has not been found in stem-initial position and thus is in parentheses above. Hale reconstructs the nasalization feature for nasal vowels. Vowel quality and prosodic features like vowel length, tone, and stress have not yet been reconstructed for the Tanoan family. Hale (1967) gives certain sets of vowel quality correspondences.

The following table illustrates the reconstructed initial consonants in Proto-Tanoan and its reflexes in the daughter languages.

Initial consonants in proto-language and daughter languages
Proto-Tanoan	Tiwa	Tewa	Towa	Kiowa	Proto-Tanoan		Tiwa	Tewa	Towa	Kiowa
Proto-Tanoan	Tiwa	Tewa	Towa	Kiowa	consonant	environment	Tiwa	Tewa	Towa	Kiowa
*h	h	h	∅	h	*dz		j	j, dʒ	z	d
*ʔ	ʔ	ʔ	ʔ	∅	*d	before oral vowel	l	d	d	d
*p	p	p	p	p	*d	before nasal vowel	n	n	n	d
*pʼ	pʼ	pʼ	pʼ	pʼ	*n		n	n	n	n
*pʰ	pʰ	f	ɸ	pʰ	*w		w	w	w	j
*b	m	m	m	b	*ɡʷ		w	w	kʷ	ɡ
*m	m	m	m	m	(*ɡ)		k	ɡ	k	ɡ
*t	t	t	t	t	*k		k	k	k	k
*ts	tʃ	ts	s	t	*kʷ		kʷ	kʷ	ɡ	k
*tʰ	tʰ	θ	ʃ	tʰ	*kʷʼ		kʷʼ	kʷʼ	ɡ	kʼ
*tsʰ	s	s	ʃ	tʰ	*kʼ		kʼ	kʼ	kʼ	kʼ
*s	ɬ	s	c	s	*kʰ		x	x	h	kʰ
*tʼ	tʼ	tʼ	tʼ	tʼ	*kʷʰ		xʷ	xʷ	h	kʰ
*tsʼ	tʃʼ	tsʼ	tʼ	tʼ						

As can be seen in the above table, a number of phonological mergers have occurred in the different languages. Cognate sets supporting the above are listed below:

Cognate sets demonstrating initial consonant correspondences
	Tiwa	Tewa	Towa	Kiowa	meaning(s)
*b	mɑ̃	mãʔ	mĩ́ː	bɔ	"to bring"
*m	mæ̃̀n-	mãn	mãté	mɔ̃ː-dɔ	"hand"
*d (+ V)	līlū-	diː	délʔɨː	–	"fowl"
*d (+ Ṽ)	ˈnæ̃̄m-	nãn	nṍː	dɔ̃-m	"sand" (in Taos), "ground" (in Tewa, Kiowa), "space" (in Jemez)
*n	næ̃̄	nãː	nĩ́ː	nɔ̃ː	first person singular
*ts	ˈtʃī	tsíː	sé	ta	"eye"
*t	tũ̀	tṹ	tɨ̃́	tõ-	"to say"
*tsʰ	sũ̀	sũwẽ	sɨ̃́	tʰõ-m	"to drink"
*tʰ	ˈtʰɤ̄	θáː	ʃó	tʰa-	"to break" (in Taos, Tewa, Jemez), "to sever several" (in Kiowa)
*ts’	ˈtʃʼɑ̄-	–	–	tʼɔ-l	"liver"
*t’	tʼɑ́-	tʼon	tʼaː	tʼɔː	"antelope"
*dz	jɑ̄-	–	zǽː	dɔ	"song" (in Taos, Jemez), "to sing" (in Kiowa)

== Bibliography ==
- Campbell, Lyle. (1997). American Indian languages: The historical linguistics of Native America. New York: Oxford University Press. ISBN 0-19-509427-1.
- Cordell, Linda A. (1979). Prehistory: Eastern Anasazi. In A. Ortiz (Ed.), Handbook of North American Indians: Southwest (Vol. 9, pp. 131–151). Washington, D.C.: Smithsonian Institution.
- Davis, Irvine. (1959). Linguistic cues to northern Rio Grande prehistory. El Palacio, 66 (3), 73–84.
- Davis, Irvine. (1979). The Kiowa–Tanoan, Keresan, and Zuni languages. In L. Campbell & M. Mithun (Eds.), The languages of native America: Historical and comparative assessment (pp. 390–443). Austin: University of North Texas.
- Dozier, Edward P. (1954). The Hopi-Tewa of Arizona. University of California Publications in American Archaeology and Ethnology, 44 (3), 259–376.
- Eggan, Fred. (1979). Pueblos: Introduction. In A. Ortiz (Ed.), Handbook of North American Indians: Southwest (Vol. 9, pp. 224–235). Washington, D.C.: Smithsonian Institution.
- Ellis, Florence Hawley. (1967). Where did the Pueblo people come from? El Palacio, 74 (3), 35–43.
- Ford, Richard I.; Schroeder, Albert H.; & Peckham, Stewart L. (1972). Three perspectives on Puebloan prehistory. In A. Ortiz (Ed.), New perspectives on the Pueblos (pp. 19–39). Albuquerque: University of New Mexico Press.
- Foster, Michael K. (1999). Language and the culture history of North America. In I. Goddard (Ed.), Handbook of North American Indians: Languages (Vol. 17, pp. 64–110). Washington, D.C.: Smithsonian Institution.
- Hale, Kenneth L. (1962). Jemez and Kiowa correspondences in reference to Kiowa–Tanoan. International Journal of American Linguistics, 28 (1), 1–5.
- Hale, Kenneth L. (1967). Toward a reconstruction of Kiowa–Tanoan phonology. International Journal of American Linguistics, 33 (2), 112–120.
- Hale, Kenneth L. (1979). Historical linguistics and archeology. In A. Ortiz (Ed.), Handbook of North American Indians: Southwest (Vol. 9, pp. 170–177). Washington, D.C.: Smithsonian Institution.
- Harrington, J. P. (1910). On phonetic and lexic resemblances in Kiowan and Tanoan. American Anthropologist, 12 (1), 119–123.
- Harrington, J. P. (1928). Vocabulary of the Kiowa language. Bureau of American Ethnology bulletin (No. 84). Washington, D.C.: U.S. Govt. Print. Off.
- Hill, Jane H. (2002). Toward a linguistic prehistory of the Southwest: "Azteco-Tanoan" and the arrival of maize cultivation. Journal of Anthropological Research, 58 (4), 457–476.
- Hill, Jane H. (2008). Northern Uto-Aztecan and Kiowa–Tanoan: Evidence of contact between the proto-Languages? International Journal of American Linguistics, 74 (2), 155–188.
- Kinkade, M. Dale; & Powell, J. V. (1976). Language and prehistory of North America. World Archaeology, 8 (1), 83-100.
- Leap, William L. (1971). Who were the Piro? Anthropological Linguistics, 13 (7), 321–330.
- Miller, Wick R. (1959). A note on Kiowa linguistic affiliations. American Anthropologist, 61 (1), 102–105.
- Mithun, Marianne. (1999). The languages of Native North America. Cambridge: Cambridge University Press. ISBN 0-521-23228-7 (hbk); ISBN 0-521-29875-X.
- Mooney, James. (1898). Calendar history of the Kiowa Indians. In 17th annual report of the Bureau of American Ethnology for 1895-1896 (Part 1, pp. 129–445). Washington, D.C.
- Mooney, James. (1907). Kiowa. In F. W. Hodge (Ed.), Handbook of American Indians (Part 1, pp. 669–701). Bureau of American Ethnology bulletin (No. 30). Washington, D.C.
- Newman, Stanley S. (1954). American Indian linguistics in the Southwest. American Anthropologist, 56 (4), 626–634.
- Nichols, Lynn. (1994). Subordination and ablaut in Kiowa–Tanoan. Southwest Journal of Linguistics, 13, 85–99.
- Nichols, Lynn. (1996). Toward a reconstruction of Kiowa–Tanoan ablaut. In Proceedings of the 22nd annual meeting of the Berkeley Linguistics Society.
- Plog, Fred. (1979). Prehistory: Western Anasazi. In A. Ortiz (Ed.), Handbook of North American Indians: Southwest (Vol. 9, pp. 108–130). Washington, D.C.: Smithsonian Institution.
- Reed, Erik K. (1949). Sources of upper Rio Grande Pueblo culture and population. El Palacio, 56 (6), 163–184.
- Snow, Dean R. (1976). The archaeology of North America. New York: The Viking Press.
- Trager, George L. (1942). The historical phonology of the Tiwa languages. Studies in Linguistics, 1 (5), 1-10.
- Trager, George L. (1951). Linguistic history and ethnologic history in the Southwest. Journal of the Washington Academy of Sciences, 41, 341–343.
- Trager, George L. (1967). The Tanoan settlement of the Rio Grande area: A possible chronology. In D. H. Hymes & W. E. Bittle (Eds.), Studies in southwestern ethnolinguistics: Meaning and history in the languages of the American Southwest (pp. 335–350). The Hague: Mouton.
- Trager, George L. (1969). Taos and Picuris: How long separated. International Journal of American Linguistics, 35 (2), 180–182.
- Trager, George L.; & Trager, Edith Crowell. (1959). Kiowa and Tanoan. American Anthropologist, 61 (6), 1078–1083.
- Wendorf, Fred. (1954). A reconstruction of northern Rio Grande prehistory. American Anthropologist, 56 (2), 200–227.
- Wendorf, Fred; & Reed, Erik K. (1955). An alternative reconstruction of northern Rio Grande prehistory. El Palacio, 62 (5/6), 131–173.
