= Sandia Pueblo =

Federally recognized Indian tribe of the United States

Tuf Shur Tia
- Location of Sandia Pueblo

Total population
- 500–600

Regions with significant populations
- USA (New Mexico)

Languages
- Tiwa, English, Spanish

Religion
- Roman Catholicism, traditional Pueblo religion

Related ethnic groups
- Tiwa people, other Pueblo peoples, Kiowa people

Sandia Pueblo (/sænˈdiːə/; Tiwa: Tuf Shur Tia) is a federally recognized tribe of Native American Tiwa Pueblo people inhabiting a 101-square-kilometre (40 mi^{2}) reservation of the same name in the eastern Rio Grande Rift of central New Mexico. It is one of 19 of New Mexico's Native American pueblos, considered one of the state's Eastern Pueblos. The population was 427 as of the 2010 census. The people are traditionally Tiwa speakers, a language of the Tanoan group, although retention of the traditional language has waned with later generations. They have a tribal government that operates Sandia Casino, Bien Mur Indian Market Center, and Sandia Lakes Recreation Area, as well as representing the will of the Pueblo in business and political matters.

== Name ==
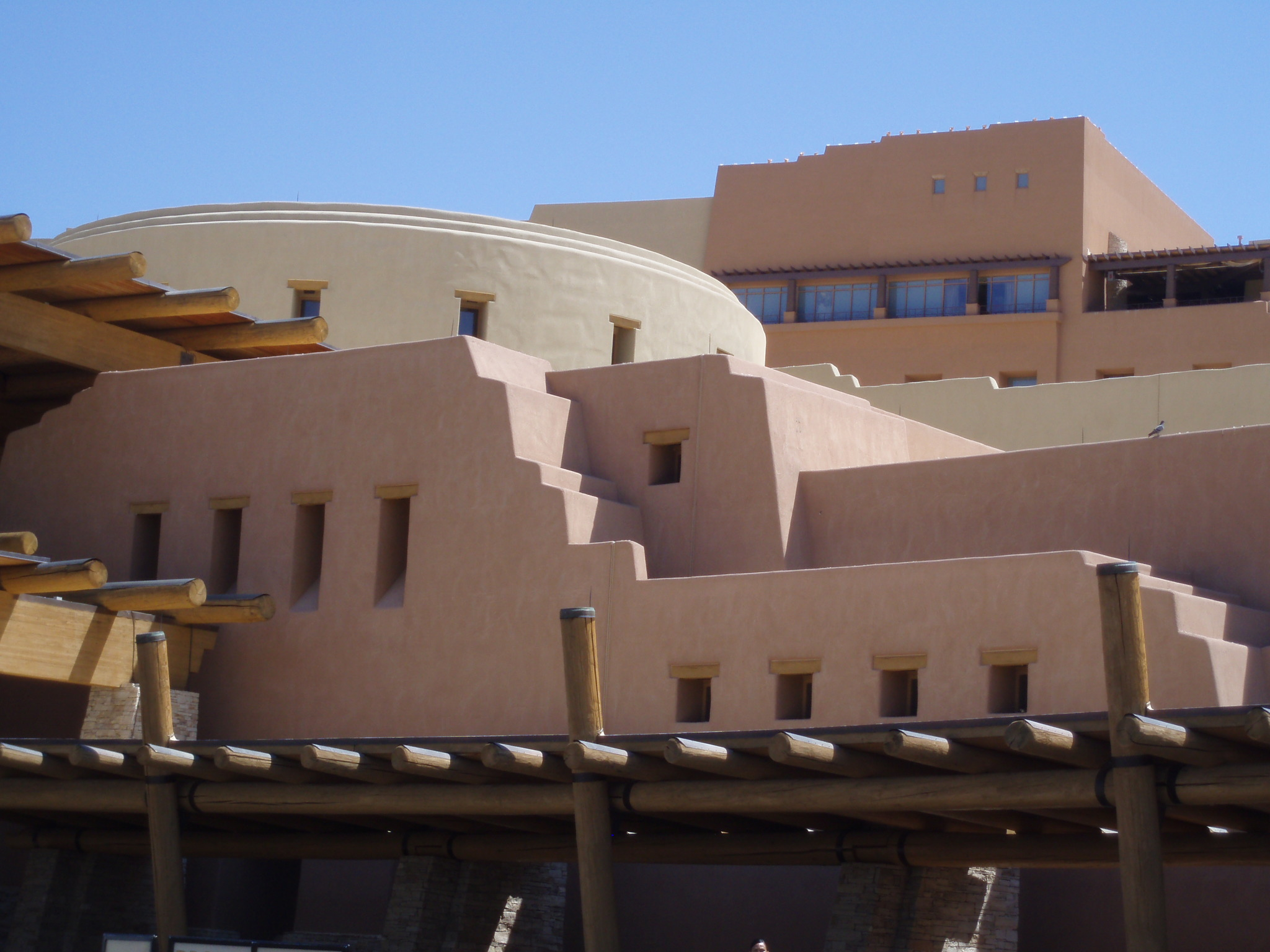
The Sandia Resort and Casino, July 2008

The Tiwa name for the pueblo is Tuf Shur Tia, or "Green Reed Place", in reference to the green bosque (Spanish: forest). However, older documents claim that the original name of the pueblo was Nafiat, (Tiwa: "Place Where the Wind Blows Dust").

It became known as Sandía (Spanish: "watermelon") in the early 17th century, and possibilities abound as to why. Some claim that a type of squash cultivated there reminded the Spaniards of the melons they knew from the Eastern Hemisphere. Others suggest that explorers found an herb called sandía de culebra, or possibly another called sandía de la pasión there.

But the most convincing and most-cited explanation is that the Spanish called the mountain Sandía after viewing it illuminated by the setting sun. The Sandia Mountains have a red appearance to them, and the layer of vegetation gives it a luminous "rind" of green when backlit, giving it the appearance of a sliced watermelon. The village closest to the range took on the name of the mountain, changing from throughout the years from San Francisco de Sandía to Nuestra Señora de los Dolores de Sandía to Nuestra Señora de los Dolores y San Antonio de Sandía before ending up as simply Sandia Pueblo or Pueblo of Sandia.

== Geography ==
The pueblo is located three miles south of Bernalillo off Highway 85 in southern Sandoval County and northern Bernalillo County, at 35.254731°N 106.573146°W. It is bounded by the city of Albuquerque to the south and by the foothills of the Sandia Mountains, a landform the people hold sacred and which was central to the traditional economy and remains important in the spiritual life of the community, to the east. A forested area known as the bosque surrounds the rest of the reservation, and serves as a source of firewood and wild game. A resident population of 4,414 was reported as of the 2000 census. Two communities located on its territory are Pueblo of Sandia Village and part (population 3,235) of the town of Bernalillo.

In 2014, the United States Congress passed the Sandia Pueblo Settlement Technical Amendment Act (S. 611; 113th Congress), by which the federal government would transfer 700 acres (280 ha) of land to the Sandia Pueblo.

== Administration ==
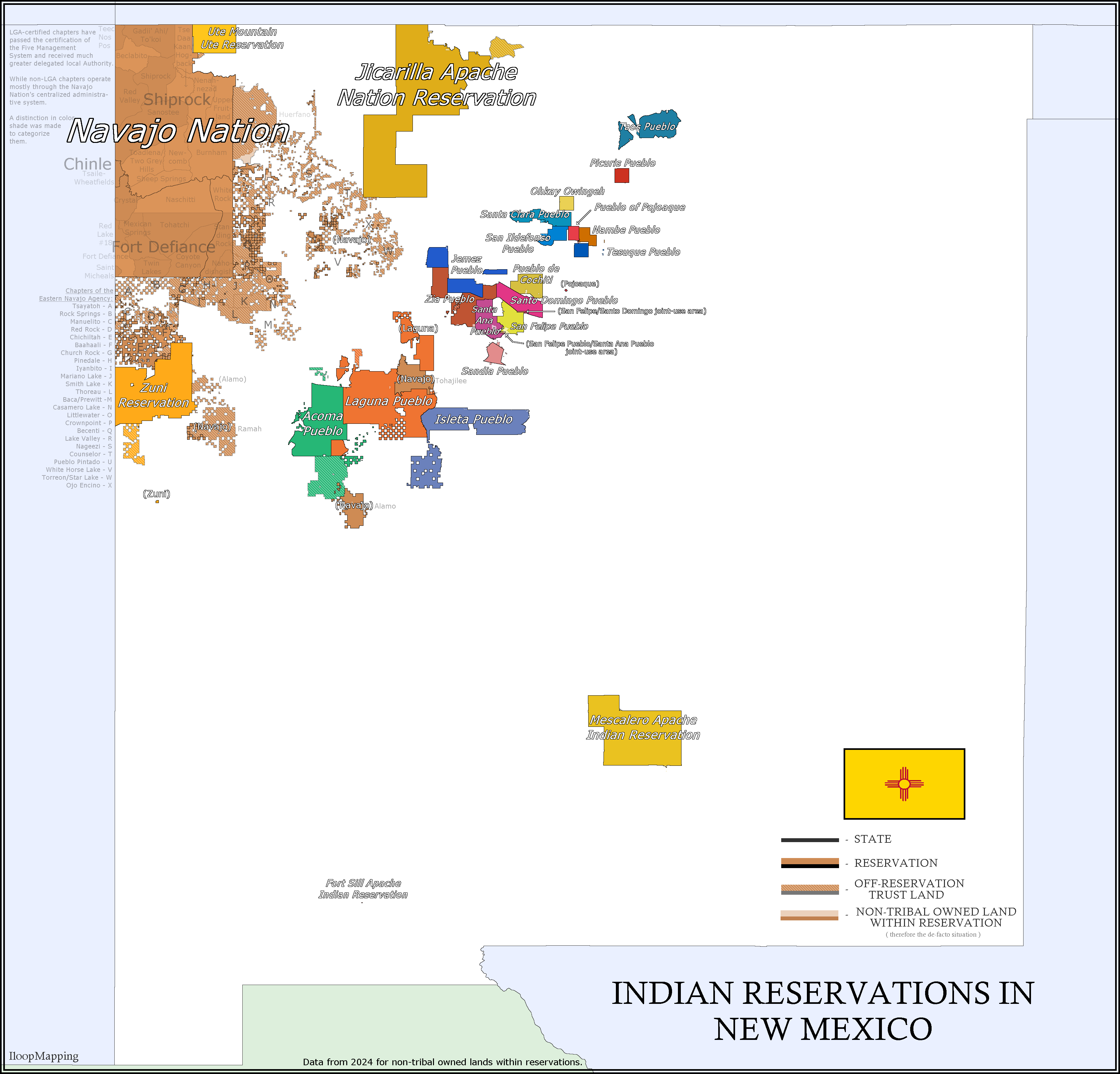
Map of the Sandia and neighboring tribes (In reddish-pink).

The administration of the Pueblo of Sandia in 2026 is:

- Governor: Stuart Paisano
- Lieutenant Governor: Alex Lujan

== History ==
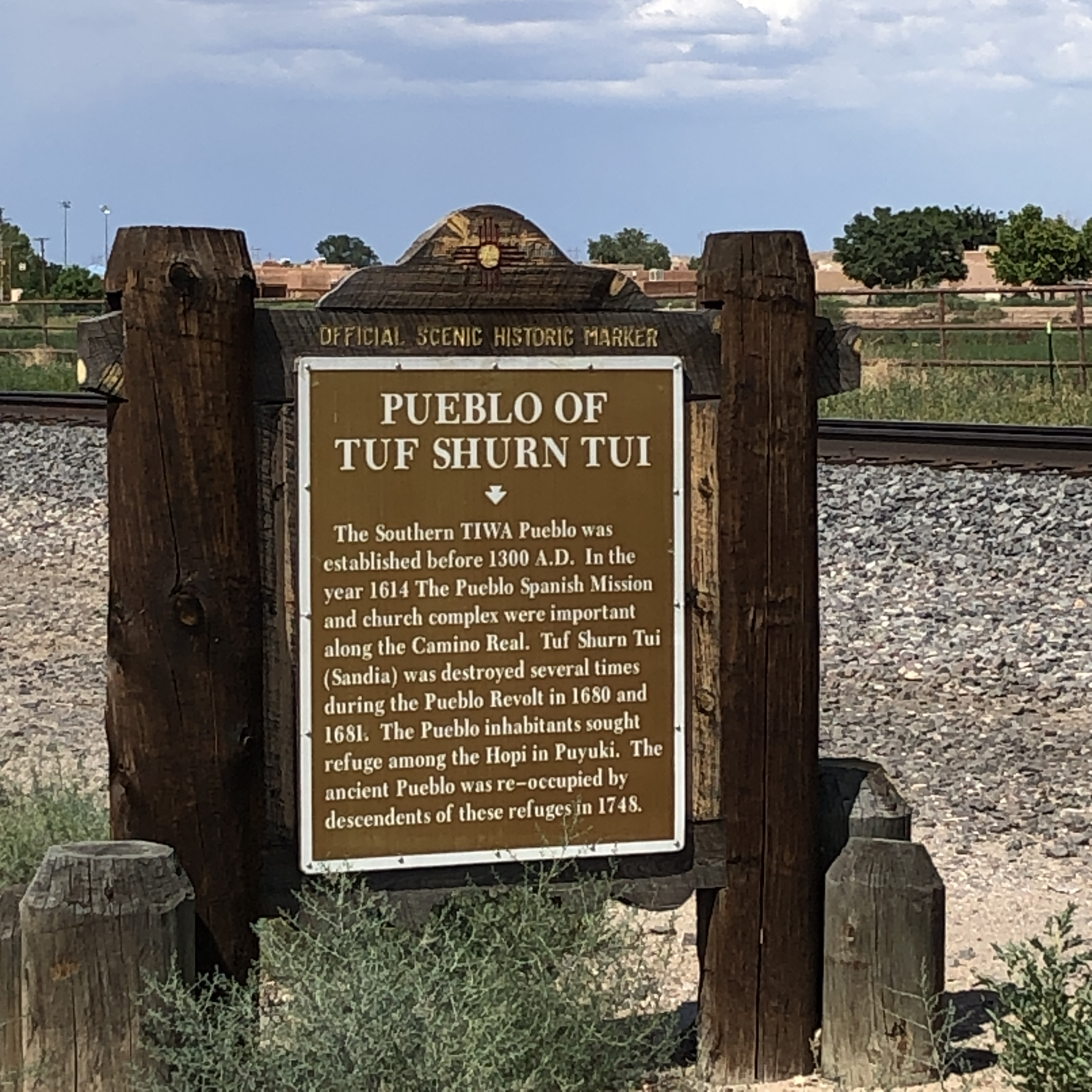
Historical Marker - Pueblo of Tuf Shurn Tui (Sandia Pueblo)

=== Antiquity ===
The Pueblo culture developed from 700 to 1100, characterized by its distinctive religious beliefs and practices and a large growth in population. The period from 1100 to 1300 CE is known as the Great Pueblo Period, and is marked by cooperation between the Pueblo peoples and the communal Great Kiva ritual. The Sandia Pueblo has resided in its current location since the 14th century, when they comprised over 20 pueblos. They were a thriving community, numbering 3,000 at the time of the arrival of Coronado in 1539 (in the Pueblo IV Era).

=== Encounter with Westerners and life under New Spain ===
Spanish conquistador Francisco Vásquez de Coronado "discovered" the Pueblo of Sandía in 1539 while on an expedition to discover the Seven Cities of Cíbola.

In 1610, Fray Esteban de Perea arrived. A descendant of a distinguished Spanish family, he was Guardian, Commissary, and Custodian of the friars in New Mexico, and was responsible for the implementation of the Inquisition in the territories under his authority.

In 1617 the area became home to the seat of the Mission of San Francisco. The Spanish exacted tribute and enslaved members of the Sandía Pueblo people for labor in the building of churches and in Mexican mines. As a result of the resentment against this abuse, the Sandía, who had already offered sanctuary for Zía and Jémez rebels, were one of the pueblos involved in the August 10, 1680 Po'pay-led Pueblo Revolt against Spanish rule that drove the Spanish from the region until its reconquest by Diego de Vargas in 1692. They did not find freedom, however, as Po'pay and his successor Luis Tupatú exacted as heavy a tribute as the Spanish and the raiding tribes had. By way of punishment for their insurrection, then governor of the territory, Antonio de Otermín, ordered the village, which by that time had been abandoned, burned on August 26. Having fled to neighboring Hopi lands, the rectory at Sandía was left unprotected and was looted.

The Sandía returned after each Spanish attack, with the 441 surviving Sandía resettling permanently in November 1742. In 1762, Governor Tomás Cachupín ordered the rebuilding of Sandía Pueblo (although his concern was primarily the housing of the Hopi who had found refuge there) as a buffer between the settlement at Albuquerque and the raids of the semi-nomadic Navajo and Apache. As a result, Sandía was raided continuously, the most deadly of such events occurring in 1775 when a Comanche raid killed thirty. The Hopi suffered the brunt of the attack as a result of their segregation from the Sandía, which has minimized their influence in the Pueblo. As a result of wars with Spanish conquistadors and raids from neighboring indigenous nations, the Sandía Pueblo diminished, numbering 350 by 1748, and dwindling to 74 by 1900.

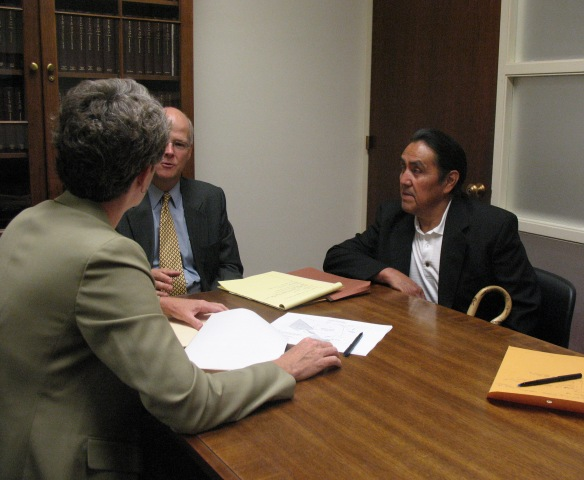
Sandia Pueblo Governor Victor Montoya (right) meeting with Congresswoman Heather Wilson, July 2007

=== Life in Mexico and the United States ===
Rule of the territory passed to Mexican hands at the end of the Mexican War of Independence in 1820. It proved difficult to establish a new republic and govern outlying territories with a history of insubordination at the same time, and New Mexico enjoyed a brief semi-autonomous period resembling the salutary neglect of the American colonies. In American history, this period is often referred to as the "Wild West", in reference to relative absence of Mexican authority, which left the region open to incursion from and settlement by American pioneers.

With the end of the Mexican–American War in 1848, the territory of New Mexico was ceded to the United States. Zebulon Pike made note of the Sandia Mountains during his 19th century expedition, calling them the "San Dies".

When Indian schools were built in Albuquerque and Santa Fe, Sandía pupils were in attendance. Nonetheless, American culture did not have a strong effect on the tribe until World War II, when the tribe sacrificed eight of their young men to the national defense.

Tribal authorities have sometimes had conflicts with state and federal authorities. They have sought to assert their longstanding claim to the Sandia Mountains east of the ridge, and they strongly opposed the construction of the Sandia Peak Tramway in 1966.

The tribe opened a casino as Bingo Hall (in a semi- permanent tent) on Bingo Loop, in 1984, but that has been replaced, as in 1994 their purpose built casino nearby opened, and it has since expanded and added a hotel to the facility. The casino's amphitheater hosts many acts passing through Albuquerque, and its proximity to the state's main urban center has made it a popular attraction among gamblers.

== Government ==
The tribal government has educational, police, maintenance, health and human services, environmental, and economic development departments. "A Governor, Lt. Governor, Warchief, and Lt. Warchief are appointed for annual terms according to Sandía's cultural tradition. Each man can be appointed to consecutive terms. The Governor and Warchief will become Tribal Council members for life. The Warchief and Lt. Warchief are responsible for all religious activities held in the Pueblo. The Governor oversees day to day government operations, while the Lt. Governor is the Tribal Court Judge."

== Culture ==
=== Religion ===
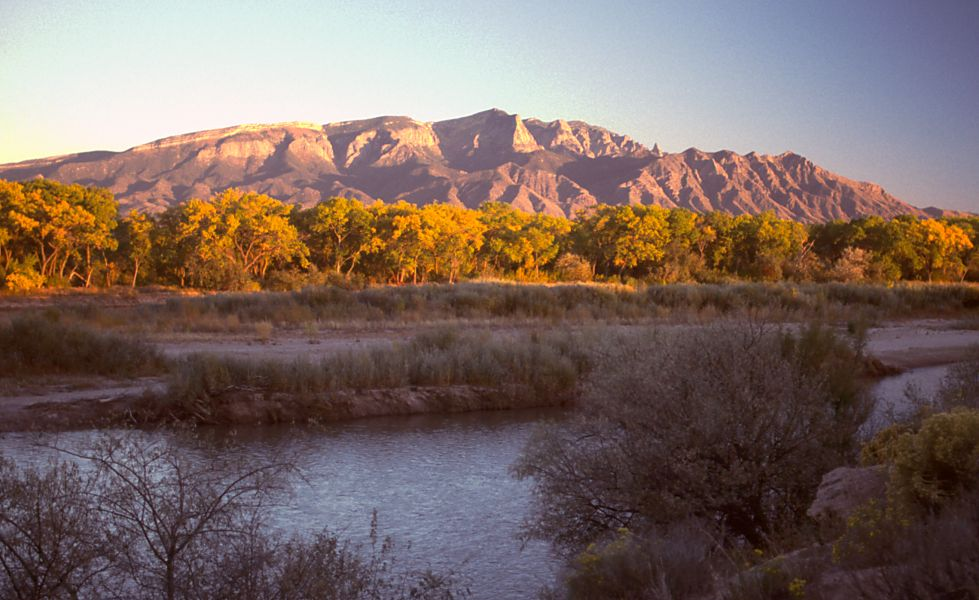
The Sandia Mountains, the sacred land of the Sandía people

The Sandía are a deeply religious people. Early reports discuss devotion to santos, or effigies of saints, a syncretic phenomenon common throughout the Southwest.

Though nominally Catholic, they preserve many of their pre-Catholic traditions. Their feast day, a tradition common to most Pueblo people, is celebrated yearly on June 13, the feast day of St. Anthony. This feast, or fiesta, as it is called, is open to the public. Music and dance are big parts of the ceremony, and it is considered an honor to participate.

They use the mountain as their official symbol.

=== Language ===
Today, English is the common language of the Pueblo, although it is sprinkled with Southern Tiwa and Spanish words and expressions. Older generations speak Southern Tiwa, Spanish, and English, but younger generations have reportedly not preserved linguistic traditions as well as their elders.

Many Spanish words incorporated into common usage, such as horno (Spanish for "oven") and bosque (Spanish for "woods"), are now pronounced with an "American" accent. (Horno, referring to the ceramic outdoor oven still in common use, is pronounced ['hor no] (cf. Spanish ['or no]), and bosque is pronounced ['bas ki] (cf. Spanish ['bos ke]).

At Sandía, Southern Tiwa is still used in music, ceremony, and daily life.

== See also ==
- List of Indian reservations in New Mexico
- List of federally recognized tribes in the United States
