= Sandia Peak (disambiguation) =

Sandia Peak may refer to:

- Sandia Crest, the high point of the Sandia-Manzano Mountains
- Sandia Peak Ski Area, the first ski resort in New Mexico
  - Sandia Peak Ski Co.
  - Sandia Peak Tramway, the world's second longest continuous-cable aerial tramway, located at the ski resort
