= La Luz Trail =

Popular hiking trail in New Mexico, United States

Coordinates: 35°12′40″N 106°27′56″W

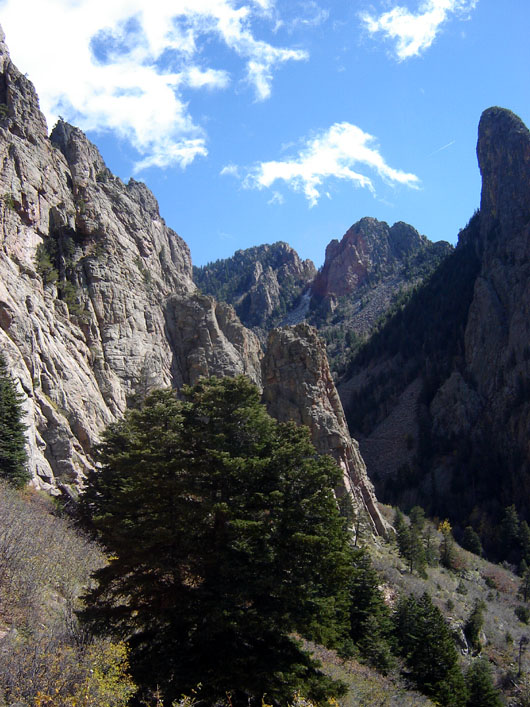
View looking into the Sandia Mountains from the La Luz Trail

The La Luz Trail (Trail 137) is a popular hiking trail located on the west face of the Sandia Mountains near Albuquerque, New Mexico. The trail begins at the La Luz Trailhead and proceeds approximately eight miles to either Sandia Crest or the Sandia Peak Tramway. The hike is strenuous, with 3,775 ft (1,151 m) of elevation gain and a grade of 12%. The trail allows hikers to view the flora and fauna of four climatic "life zones" and the granite cliffs and spires native to the west face of the Sandia Mountains. It also offers excellent views of Albuquerque, the cinder cones of the Albuquerque Volcanoes, and Mount Taylor. The La Luz Trail is also home to the La Luz Trail Run.

== Location ==
The La Luz Trail is located in the northwestern part of the Sandia Mountains subrange of the Sandia-Manzano Mountains. It can be accessed from Sandia Crest, the Sandia Peak Tramway, or the La Luz Trailhead. The La Luz Trailhead is accessed by taking the Forest Road 333 turnoff from Tramway Road (NM 556). Parking is open to the public.

== Trail information ==
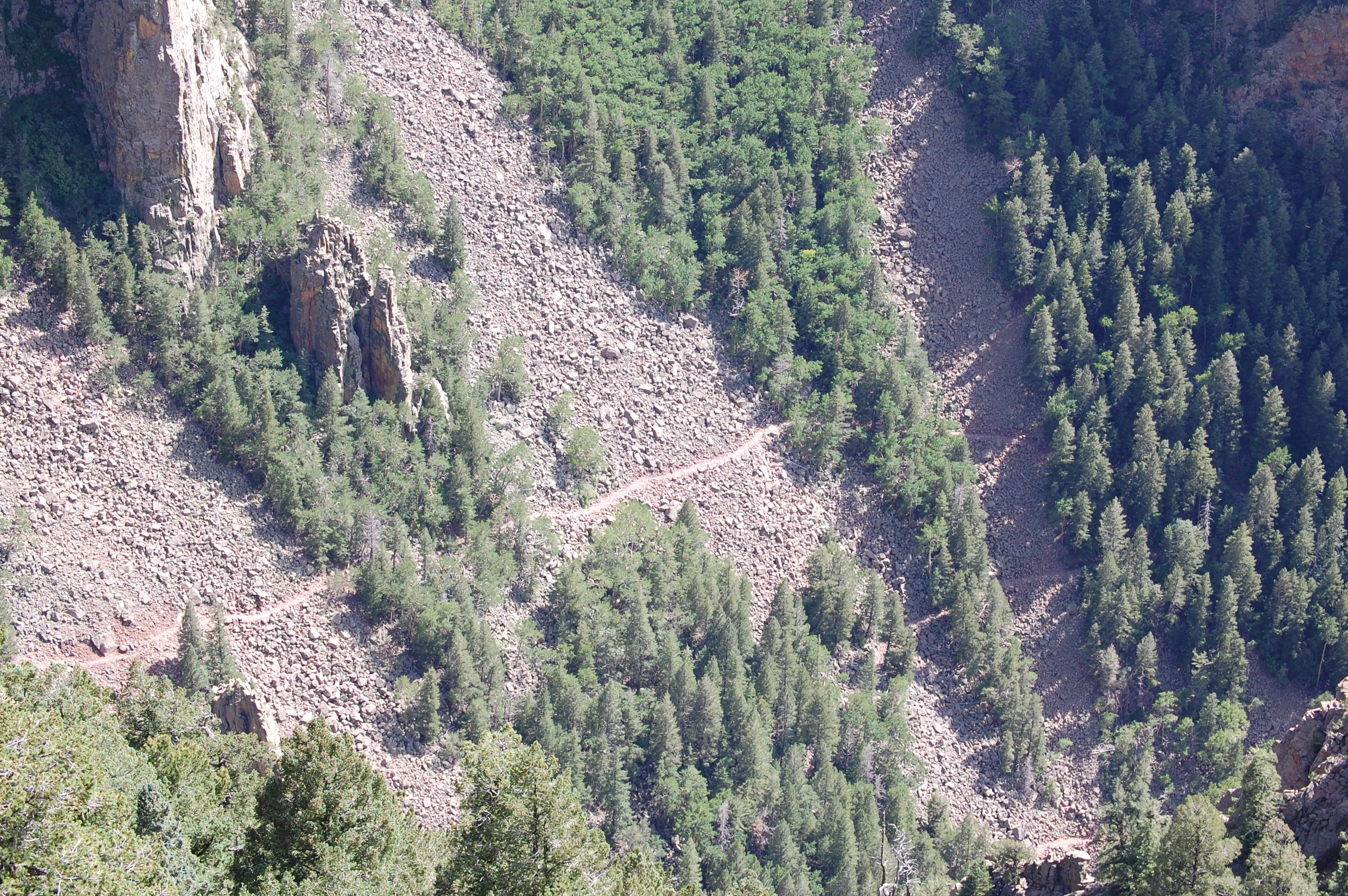
View from Sandia Crest of the La Luz Trail, in the rockslide switchbacks

The trail originates at the La Luz Trailhead, which has an elevation of 7,050 ft (2,150 m). The lower reaches of the trail are a wide dirt path that climbs at a moderate slope. This part of the trail passes through the Upper Sonoran Zone life zone, where juniper and piñon trees, prickly pear cactus, and cholla cactus are found. About a mile from the trailhead is the junction of La Luz Trail and the Tramway trail. The Tramway trail connects to the lower tram terminal and allows hikers to use the tram to return to their vehicles instead of hiking the 15-mile (24 km) round trip. As the trail climbs the mountain, the scrub forest is replaced by the alpine forest of the Transition Zone, with ponderosa pines, blue spruce trees, and assorted wildflowers in the summer months. A scenic overlook is found at around 8,900 ft (2,700 m) and a distance of about 4.35 miles (7.00 km). Just past this overlook is a sign that warns hikers that the trail beyond is snowy and impassable in the winter months. The trail becomes narrower and more rocky after the overlook. The trail travels through a steep, rocky draw with the many quaking aspen and pines of the Canadian Zone. Hikers traverse 19 switchbacks in this area as they near the top of the trail. Approximately 6.7 miles (10.8 km) from the trailhead in the Hudsonian Zone, the La Luz trail forks. The right (south) fork leads to the upper terminal of the Sandia Peak Tramway at Sandia Peak Ski Area, and a final elevation of 10,378 ft (3,163 m). The left (north) fork is the Crest Spur Trail (Trail 84) and travels approximately 0.6 miles (0.97 km) up a very steep slope to Sandia Crest and has a final elevation of 10,678 ft (3,255 m).

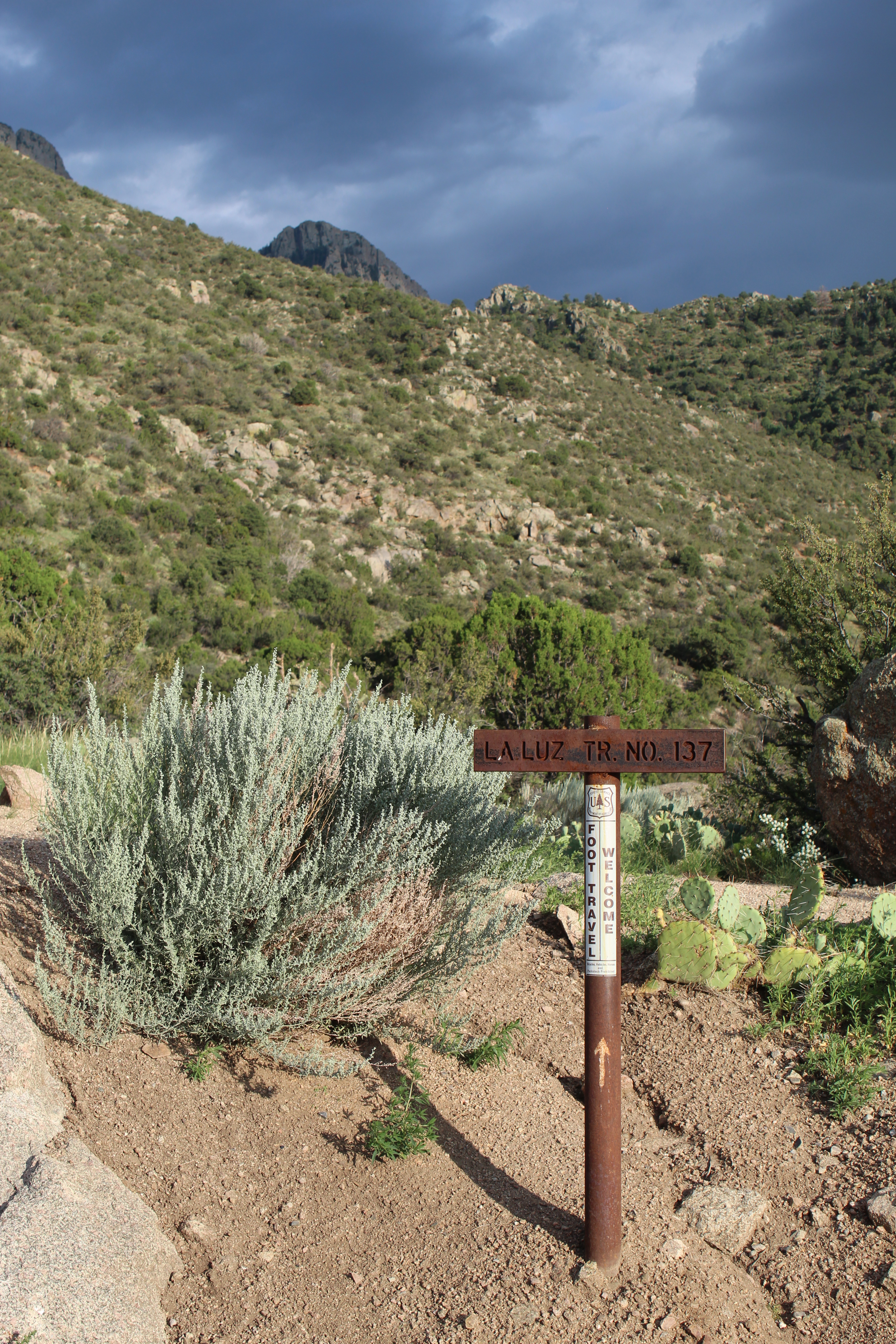
La Luz Trail Head

== Trail conditions and precautions ==
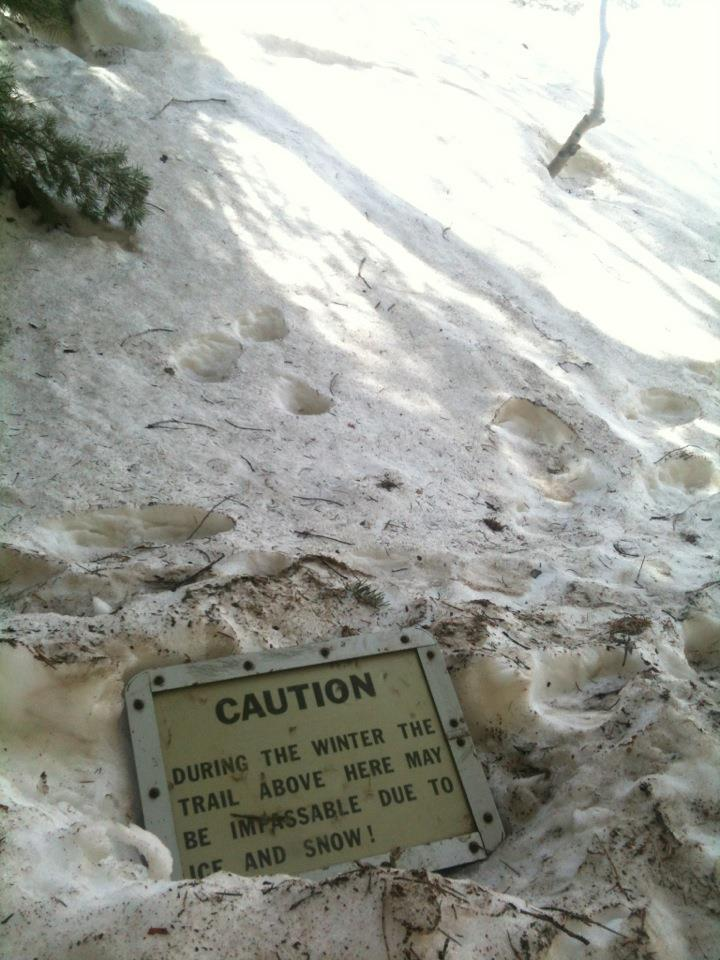
Winter warning sign

The La Luz trail is a strenuous day hike, especially if hikers are attempting to hike up and down the trail. Often, hikers will turn around at a set point on the trail or use the tram to only hike one way on the trail. It is recommended that all hikers be in the appropriate physical condition for their desired trip length, and to take the necessary equipment including severe weather clothing.

The La Luz trail is well-worn due to the large number of hikers it receives. However, it is possible to lose the trail, as there have been some relocations of switchbacks. In the winter months, the area above the 5-mile (8.0 km) sign is very snowy, and requires snowshoes and trekking poles for passage. Upper La Luz Trail is snow-covered and impassable from November to April. The trail is subject to closure due to extreme fire danger in the hot summer months. The Sandia Ranger District provides a website that has a page of current trail conditions such as ice and snow.

Wildlife biologists situated at Cibola National Forest and National Grasslands have been presented with numerous accounts about the presence of a mountain lion along the La Luz trail, which is situated in the Sandia Ranger District. The mountainous terrain serves as optimal habitat for mountain lions and it is not uncommon to sporadically encounter them; however, in recent months, there has been a noticeable increase in sightings, particularly during the periods of dawn and dusk.

== La Luz Trail run ==
The La Luz Trail has been the site of a trail race up its slopes since the first run that began in 1965. After the designation of the Sandia Mountain Wilderness area in the 1970s, the race was limited to 400 participants by the Forest Service. These slots are filled by lottery. The run is nine miles (14 km) in length, beginning with 1.8 miles (2.9 km) on Forest Road 333 and finishing at Sandia Crest after running 7.2 miles (11.6 km) of the trail. This run was honored as one of the "12 Most Grueling Trail Races in North America" by the fall 2001 issue of Trail Runner Magazine.
