= TWA Flight 260 =

1955 aviation accident

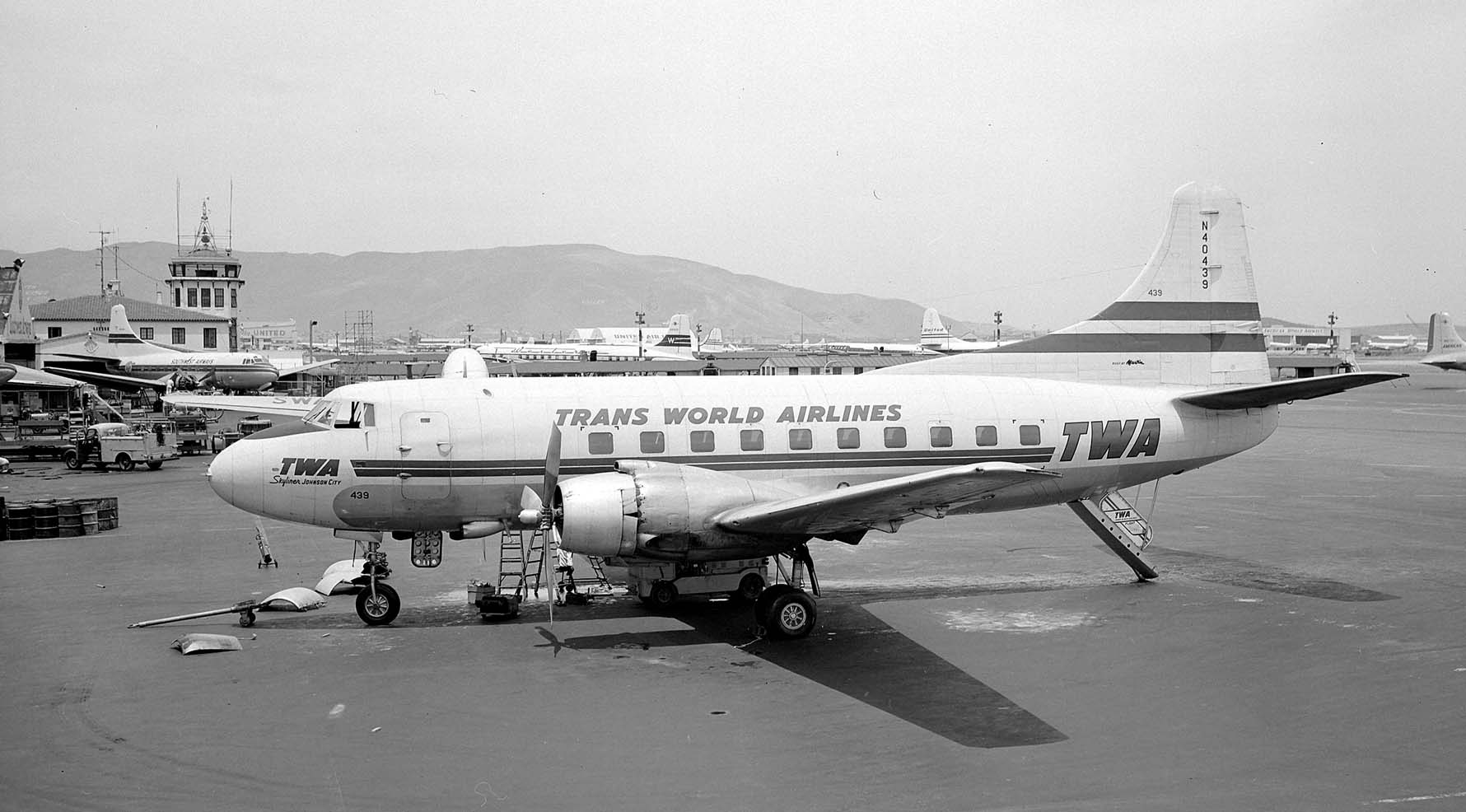
- A Martin 4-0-4 of Trans World Airlines, similar to the aircraft involved.

Accident
- Date: February 19, 1955
- Summary: Controlled flight into terrain
- Site: Sandia Mountains, Bernalillo County, New Mexico, United States; 35.194°N 106.442°W

Aircraft
- Aircraft type: Martin 4-0-4
- Operator: Trans World Airlines
- IATA flight No.: TW260
- ICAO flight No.: TWA260
- Call sign: TWA 260
- Registration: N40416
- Flight origin: Albuquerque International Airport, New Mexico, United States
- Destination: Santa Fe Municipal Airport, New Mexico, United States
- Occupants: 16
- Passengers: 13
- Crew: 3
- Fatalities: 16
- Survivors: 0

TWA Flight 260 was a scheduled passenger flight by Trans World Airlines (TWA) from Albuquerque, New Mexico, to Santa Fe, New Mexico, in the United States. On February 19, 1955, the 40-passenger Martin 4-0-4 prop plane servicing the route crashed into the Sandia Mountains, killing all 16 passengers and crew members. Its deviation from the normal flight path, initially believed to be the result of pilot error, was revised to "unknown" given that the contribution of other factors could not be definitively ruled out. The crash remains the deadliest aviation incident in New Mexico history.

== Aircraft ==
The aircraft for Flight 260 was a Martin 4-0-4 with the tail number N40416. It was seventy-four feet and seven inches long and twenty-eight feet and five inches tall. This accommodated the maximum of forty passengers. Its wings spanned ninety-three feet and three inches and its maximum speed was 271 knots (312 mph).

== Passengers and crew ==
Captain Ivan Spong, the pilot of Flight 260, knew the Albuquerque-Santa Fe route well and had flown it a dozen times that month. According to a family member quoted by Charles Williams, the pilot expressed uneasiness when he had to make the trip to Santa Fe in bad weather. Captain Ivan Spong started his career as a test pilot for Cessna Aircraft and also served as a flight instructor. During World War II, Captain Spong undertook flights to transport supplies, payroll, and injured U.S. soldiers and German war prisoners. After the war, he began his training with TWA in 1942 and eventually became a captain.

First Officer Jesse James Creason Jr., formally known as J.J., acquired his aircraft experience by operating crop dusters, receiving flight training, and serving in the U.S. Army Air Corps. He began flying for TWA in 1952 and learned the Albuquerque route, completing it 32 times.

== Accident ==
On February 19, 1955 at 7:03 am, TWA flight 260 en route from Albuquerque, New Mexico to Santa Fe, New Mexico received an IFR clearance from the Albuquerque tower ("ATC clears TWA 260 for approach at the Santa Fe Airport via Victor 19 climb northbound on the back course of the ILS localizer"). There were no further communications after the aircraft took off at 7:05. It was last seen in a high-speed shallow climb toward the cloud-shrouded Sandia Crest at an estimated altitude of 3,000 feet (910 m) above ground level.

At 7:13 the flight crashed into the Sandia Mountains killing all 13 passengers and three crew members on board. Authorities were not aware of the crash location until the next morning when a cargo pilot spotted the wreckage. Due to the complex mountainous terrain, several members of the New Mexico Mountain Club, along with Explorer Scouts and Boy Scouts, assisted Airmen and New Mexico State Police in the recovery efforts. This later led to the formation of the Albuquerque Mountain Rescue Council, a volunteer organization still active today. Mountaineers George Boatman and Frank Powers were the first people to reach the crash site.

== Investigation ==
The initial Civil Aeronautics Board (CAB) Accident Investigation Report was released on October 12, 1955. Originally the cause was believed to be that the pilots were "intentionally flying the plane into the mountain". This initial CAB "probable cause" adopted a widespread rumor: it implied a "suicide pact" between the two airline pilots. An amended accident report was released by CAB on August 26, 1957, which deleted the word "intentional".

Captain Larry DeCelles worked cooperatively with the CAB's investigators to understand pilot reports of latent faults in a fluxgate compass that appeared only after extended intervals with turn bank-angle. After these investigations, the CAB issued a third version of the report on June 15, 1960 naming the probable cause as "deviation from the prescribed flight path for reasons unknown" given that malfunction of the fluxgate compass as a contributing factor could not be entirely ruled out.

On May 14 members of the New Mexico Mountain Club who had participated in the initial recovery effort returned to the site to recover and bury any human remains left at the site before the summer climbing season. They collected over 150 pounds of remains and also recovered a Fluxgate compass from the remains of the left wing tip where it had been left by the impact. Because of a design wiring defect both the pilot's and copilot's RMI gauges were driven by the same Fluxgate compass which was the one recovered. For this reason, neither pilot could have known of the erroneous data displayed on his RMI. Although "in order to accept the theory offered, the Board must conclude that both crew members were completely oblivious to all these [countervailing] indications, that their attention was focused entirely on the RMI, and that they did not cross-check any other flight instruments", this evidence convinced the CAB to amend the accident report to include instrument error as a possible contributing factor. The CAB's third version of their Accident Report discussed their willingness to work cooperatively with experts from the airline and the pilots' association toward revising its previous report.

The Board recognizes that the theory of the fluxgate compass error advanced by the Air Line Pilots Association can not be disproven. Such error may account for the initial directional error of the flight heading the aircraft toward the Sandia Mountains. However, it can not account for the continued flight long past time the crew should have noticed the error.

== Wreckage and recovery ==
According to the National Historic Preservation Act of 1966, any historic site that is 50 years or older is protected. The TWA wreckage met the 50-year mark in 2005, making removing any plane wreckage illegal. Therefore, the TWA wreckage is considered a historic site. Wreckage from the craft can still be seen by people riding the Sandia Peak Tramway, a popular tourist attraction, on brightly lit days as the wreckage sits just underneath the tram. Fifty years after the crash, Hugh Prather, a man who grew up in the shadows of the Sandia Mountains, fixed a simple memorial to the largest piece of remaining wreckage. The memorial states the names of the sixteen victims and a brief description of the crash. The location of the crash is locally referred to as "TWA Canyon", and the ridge that Flight 260 struck is known locally as "Dragons Tooth".

The bodies of the victims were recovered over the span of four days. On the early morning of February 20, approximately 400 Explorer Scouts and Boy Scout leaders joined the group search alongside Airmen and State Police officers already involved.

== Aftermath ==
Captain Spong's wife, Jean Spong, began receiving harassing phone calls and mail after the crash, especially once the initial CAB report was released. Her son was bullied at school by other kids. Eventually, she and her son moved from Kansas City to Phoenix to live with her husband's sister and cousin in order to get away from the harassment. As per New Mexico law at the time, the insurance claims for the passengers was limited to $10,000 per victim. These payments were to be paid by the airline.
