= Cibola gneiss =

Body of rock in New Mexico, U.S.

- Stratigraphic range: Statherian
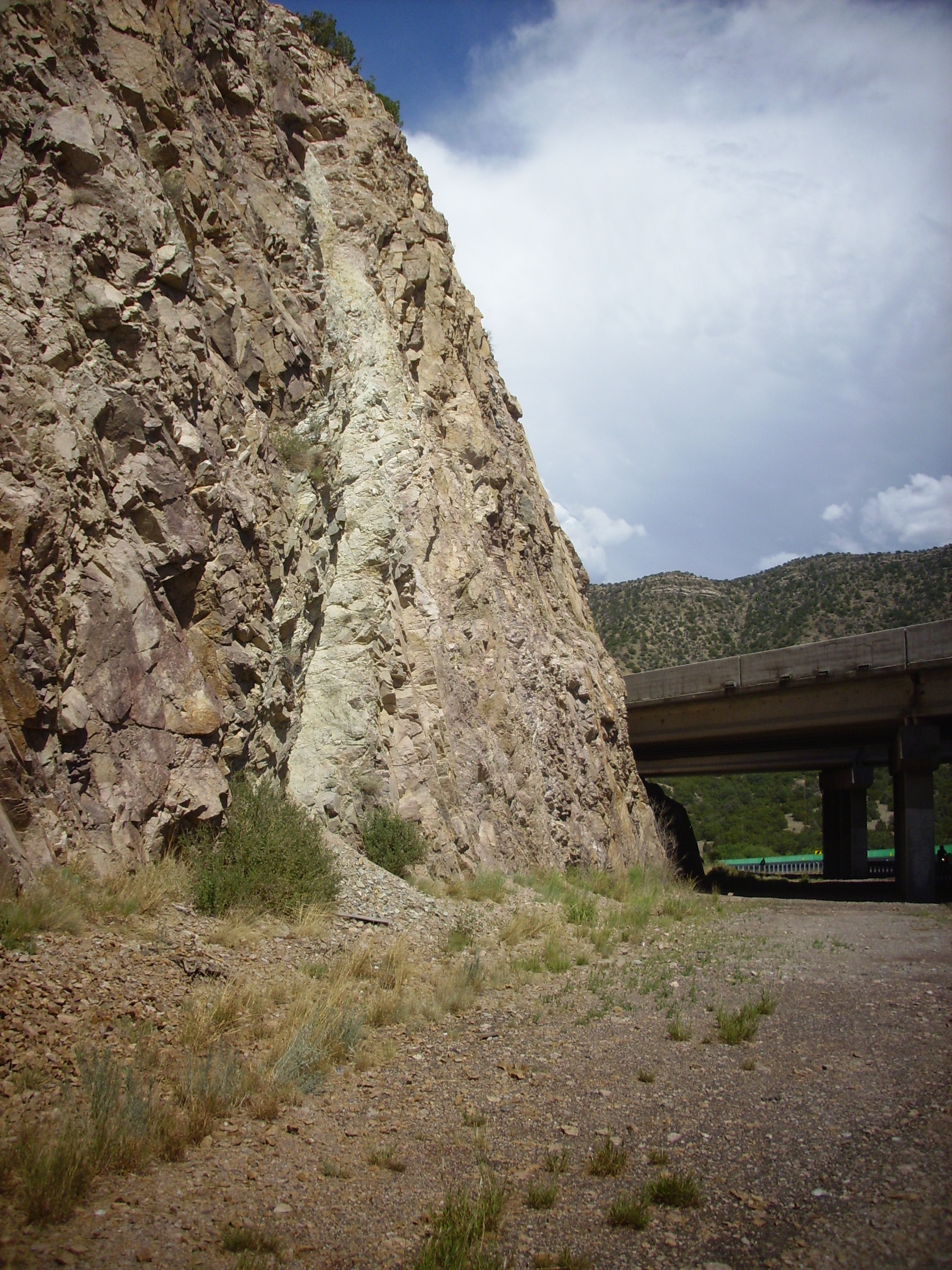
- Road cut in the Cebola Gneiss, Tijeras Canyon, New Mexico, USA
- Type: Pluton

Lithology
- Primary: Orthogneiss

Location
- Coordinates: 35.066°N 106.425°W
- Region: Tijeras Canyon
- Country: United States

Type section
- Named for: Cibola National Forest
- Named by: Kelley and Northrop
- Year defined: 1975
- Cibola gneiss (the United States) Cibola gneiss (New Mexico)

The Cibola gneiss is a pluton in central New Mexico, United States. It has a radiometric age of 1653±16 Ma, corresponding to the Statherian period.

== History of investigation ==
The unit was first defined by Kelley and Northrop in 1975. It has also been referred to as the Cibola granite.

== Geology ==
The pluton lies in the southern Sandia Mountains, with Sandia granite to the northwest and Seven Springs shear zone to the south. The pluton may include three compositionally distinct phases: a fine-grained, peraluminous, two-mica leucogranite with a radiometric age of 1632±45 Ma, a medium-grained equigranular monzogranite with a radiometric age of 1659±13 Ma, and a generally coarse-grained monzogranite with no reported age. The gneiss is locally mylonitic with a strong gneissic metamorphic fabric defined by alignment of micas. A typical modal composition is 35% quartz, 30% plagioclase, and 20% potassium feldspar, 7% muscovite, 6% biotite, 1% opaques, and 1% trace minerals. The trace minerals are actinolite, chlorite, epidote, andalusite, sphene, zircon, rutile, apatite, tourmaline, and limonite. The feldspar component becomes more alkalic close to the Sandia granite, with potassium feldspar and sillimanite coexisting only close to the contact. This may indicate metasomatism from the Sandia Granite.

The pluton contains xenoliths of quartzite, lithic arenite, amphibolite, and phyllitic schist that contain andalusite, kyanite, sillimanite, fibrolite, and retrograde chlorite. This suggests a metamorphic grade similar to the aureole of the nearby Manzanita pluton.

The pluton is interpreted as having been emplaced during caldera volcanism associated with the Mazatzal orogeny.
