= Sandia Peak Ski Area =

Ski resort in New Mexico, United States

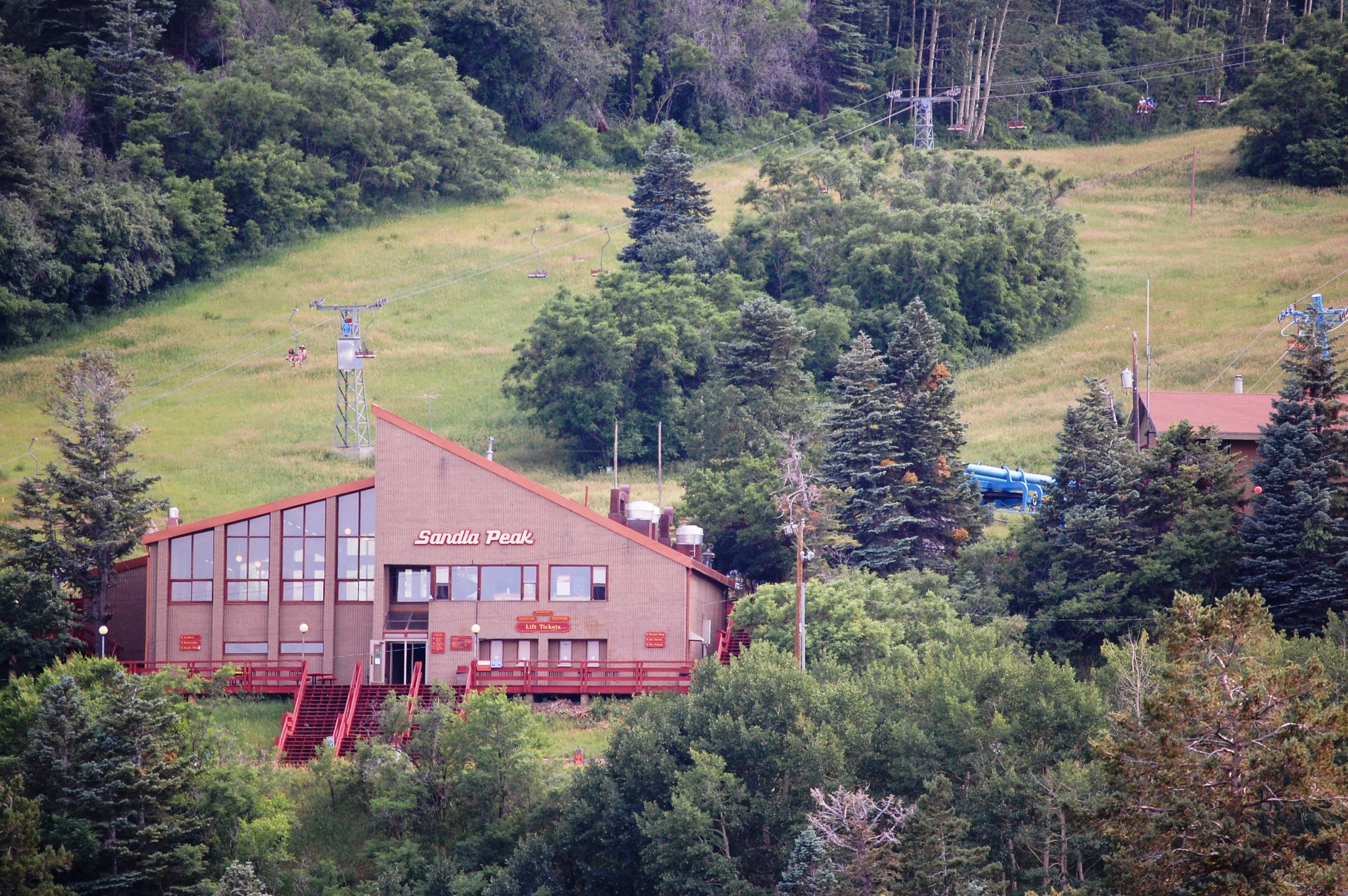
- Base and ski lodge in July, 2009

- Location in the United States Location in New Mexico
- Location: Bernalillo County, New Mexico, U.S.
- Nearest city: Albuquerque
- Coordinates: 35°12′25.22″N 106°24′48.41″W
- Vertical: 1,700 feet (520 m)
- Top elevation: 10,378 feet (3,163 m)
- Base elevation: 8,678 feet (2,645 m)
- Skiable area: 200 acres (0.81 km^{2})
- Trails: 35 total: 23% beginner; 49% intermediate; 29% advanced
- Longest run: "Double Eagle II" ~ 2 miles (3 km)
- Lift system: 6 lifts: 4 double lifts, 1 aerial tramway, 1 surface lift
- Lift capacity: 3,105 guests/hour (adjusted)
- Terrain parks: 1 (Scrapyard)
- Snowfall: 125 inches (10.4 ft; 3.2 m)
- Snowmaking: 22 acres (8.9 ha)
- Website: sandiapeak.com

Sandia Peak Ski Area, originally La Madera Ski Area, is a ski resort located in the Sandia Mountains in northeast Bernalillo County, New Mexico, United States, immediately northeast of the city of Albuquerque. It is part of a Special Use Permit Zone in the Sandia Ranger District of the Cibola National Forest. It is New Mexico's first ski area, opening to skiers in 1936. It features Sandia Peak Tramway, which was until 2010 the longest tramway in the world, and remains the longest in the Americas. The resort includes 35 ski runs and a terrain park, and also serves as a site for summer recreation. It is one of the few ski resorts in the US that can be directly accessed from a major city.

== Etymology ==
Sandia Peak was originally known as La Madera Ski Area, named after the nearby La Madera canyon. "La madera" is Spanish for "the wood", referring to the timber resources in the area.

"Sandia Peak" is not an actual topographical peak, but rather a spur of the highpoint of the Sandia Mountains, Sandia Crest. The name "Sandia" comes from the Spanish word for watermelon: "sandía". One theory suggests that this name came from the appearance of the mountains from the Rio Grande Valley below: an inverted watermelon slice-shaped range with a ridge of green forest at the top (the "rind"). The exposed granite of the range, the Sandia granite, appears pink with the setting sun.

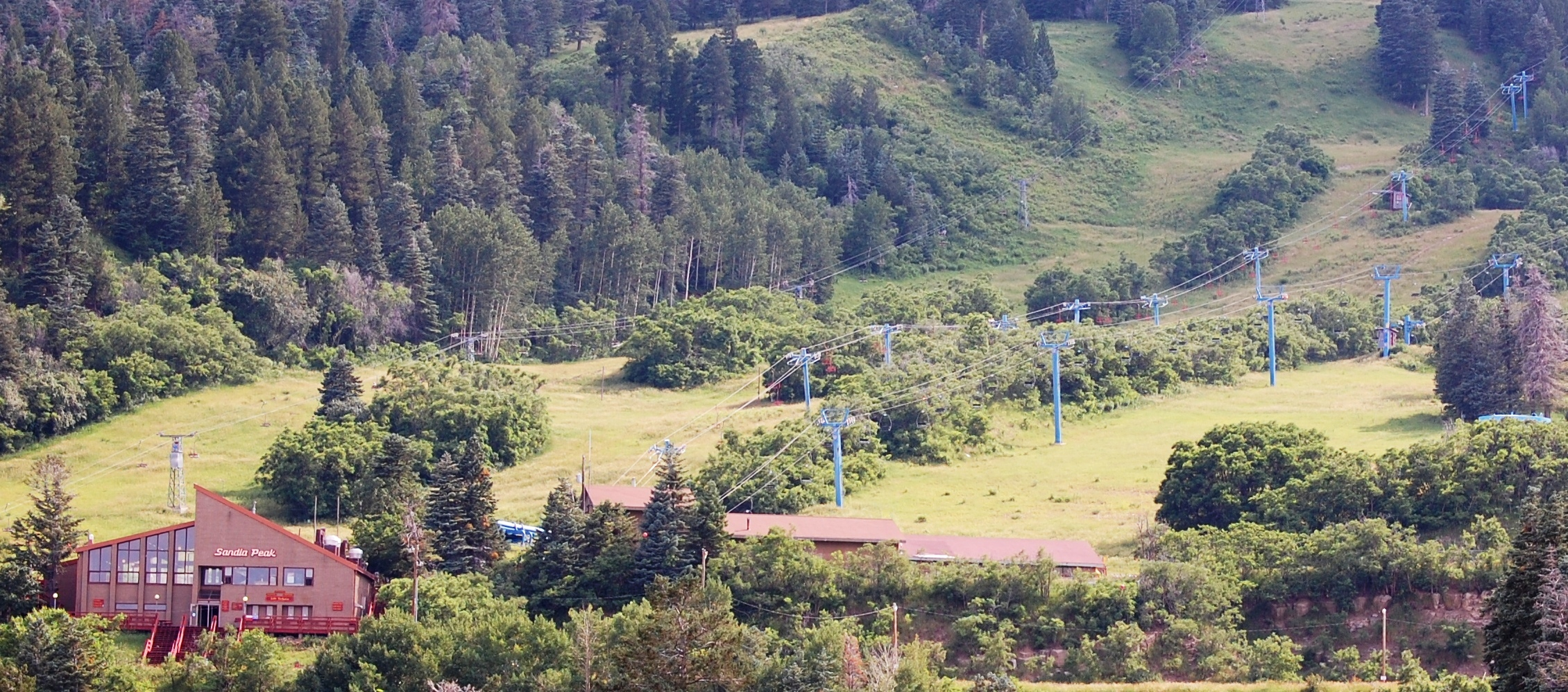
A wider view of the base

== History ==
=== La Madera ===
The Albuquerque Ski Club, founded by Robert Nordhaus, a lawyer and father of Nobel Prize-winning economist William Nordhaus, cleared ski runs in the Sandia Mountains at Tree Springs in 1935. The club then opened La Madera Ski Area in 1936 with a 1,500 foot (460 m) rope tow. Two trips on the rope tow cost 50 cents. The following year, a second rope tow was installed to Panoramic Point, and a ski lodge, built with the help of members of the CCC, was constructed. In 1939, La Madera hosted New Mexico's first downhill ski race.

The resort closed to the public at the outbreak of World War II and remained so until the war concluded.

After the war, the upper rope tow was removed and a state-of-the-art T-bar lift, Constam Lift, was installed in 1946. With a rise of 1,000 feet (300 m) and length of 4,200 feet (1,300 m), it was the longest T-bar lift in the US. The ice skating rink was installed in 1947, and a bunkhouse built in 1948. During this time, a lift ticket on Constam was $3.50, and ski lessons were $3.

In 1951, ownership of La Madera was transferred to the City of Albuquerque for the 1951-52 ski season, and subsequently lost money during the operation. The following season, ownership was transferred back to the Albuquerque Ski Club, which then turned a profit of $2,500. In 1958, Nordhaus and his business partner, balloonist Ben Abruzzo, who had helped turn Albuquerque into an international ballooning destination, purchased La Madera from the club. During this time, lift tickets were $3.50 per day and $25 for a season pass. A six-day lesson cost $12.

Sandia Crest Rd, which replaced the old dirt road between Sandia Park and La Madera, was constructed in 1960. It improved access to the resort dramatically, helping turn a trip of "several hours of potholes and mud to an easy 45 minute drive". Sections of the old dirt road are still visible to the south of the new road.

=== Sandia Peak ===
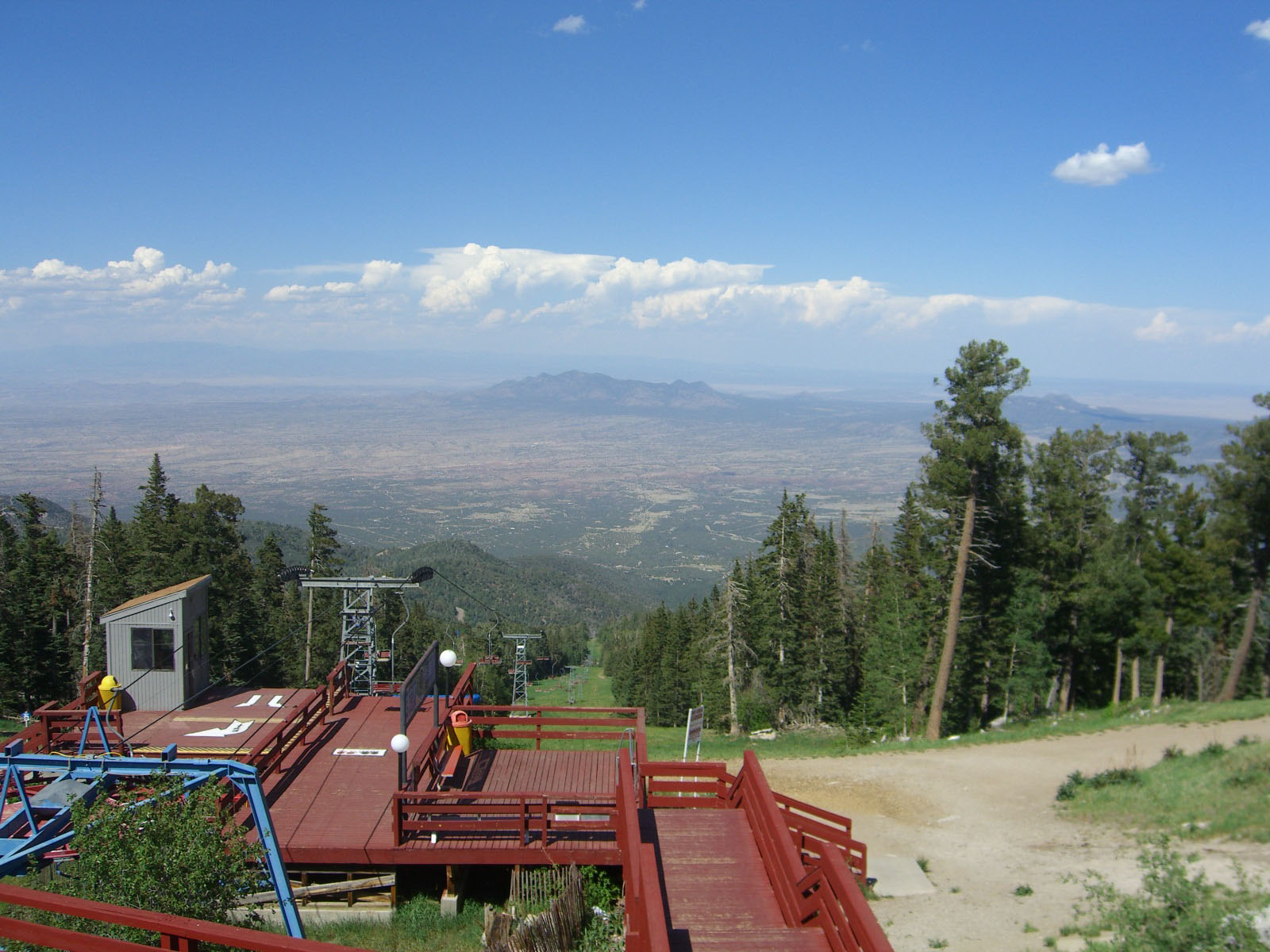
View from the summit looking east with Chairlift #1 in the foreground

In 1962 and 63, the first chairlift, aptly named Chairlift #1, was installed, and the name of the resort was changed to Sandia Peak Ski Area. Nordhaus was inspired to build an aerial tramway from Albuquerque to the ski slope after seeing other trams during a trip to Europe. Bell Engineering of Lucerne, Switzerland, was contracted to design and construct the tramway. Construction lasted two years, and was aided by over 5,000 helicopter trips. Testing took an additional 60 days. Sandia Peak Tramway entered service on May 7, 1966. It is, as of 2022, the longest aerial tramway in the Americas, and remained the longest in the world until being surpassed in 2010.

=== Future ===
In 2017, the US Forest Service adopted plans outlined in the resort's 2016 master plan for a "Four Seasons Activity Area", including a food service yurt, and two ziplines. When finished, it will provide additional year-around recreation at the resort.

Also included in the plan is a new mountain bike path, climbing wall, ropes course, disc golf course, tubing park, additional terrain park, and upgrades to parking, snowmaking infrastructure, and base facilities, including a concert and lecture area.

Chairlift #1, one of the oldest operating chairlifts in New Mexico, will be replaced with a detachable quad chairlift to increase capacity. Chairlift #1 is a fixed-length double lift and has the lowest capacity of the resort's three summit-serving chairlifts, but is used as the primary lift due to its length and ability to operate in high winds. Chairlift #2 will be converted to foot traffic only to serve the Four Seaseons Activity Area. Chairlift #3, which provides redundant base-to-summit service, will be retained for redundancy, or eventually decommissioned. Beginner Chairlift #4 will also be retained. The Mitey Mite handle tow (#5) will be replaced with a conveyor. A new chair or surface lift, Chairlift #6, will be built to serve the beginner area and tubing park. Sandia Peak Ski Area was sold to Mountain Capital Partners (MCP) in early 2024 and opened for about a month with Chair #3 operating. Repairs to Chair #3 and Chair #4 were made during the summer of 2024.

== Description ==
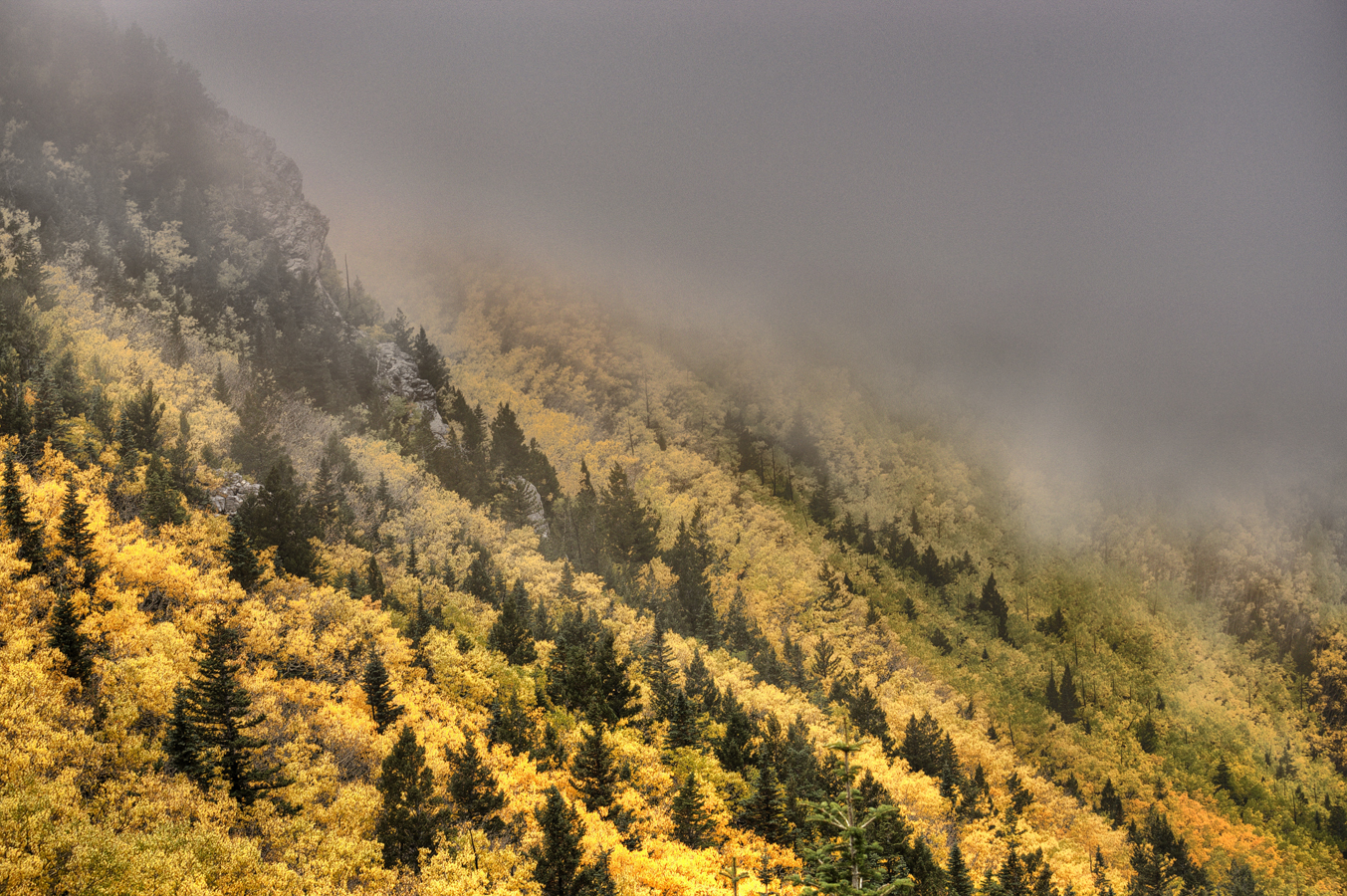
Forest in the Sandia Mountains

Sandia Peak is located in the main unit of the Cibola National Forest, and is surrounded by Hudsonian Zone heavy forest of Engelmann spruce, white oak, quaking aspen, white fir, juniper, and ponderosa pine. The resort is accessed from the east side of the mountains via Sandia Crest Rd (NM 536), which provides access to the base of the ski area, and from the west side via the tramway, which takes riders on a 15-minute trip from the eastern edge of Albuquerque to the summit. Sandia Crest Rd is subject to closures during difficult driving condition events.

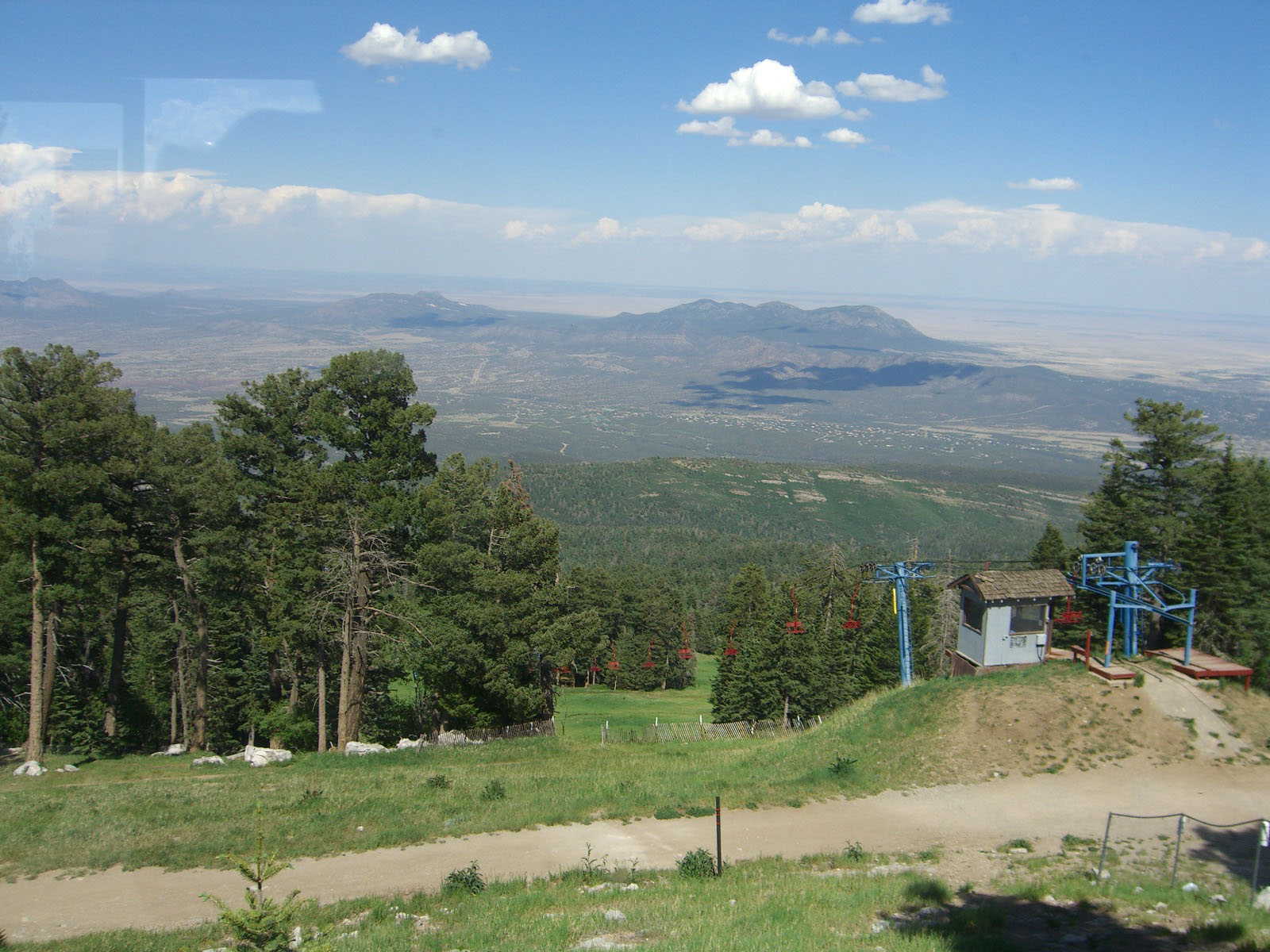
Upper terminus of Charlift #3

The base lodge, Double Eagle II Day Lodge, contains a restaurant, gift shop, day rentals, a ski patrol station, and two ski instruction schools: Cubby corner, for children under 11; and the Snow Sports School, for students 10 and older. Cubby Corner has an eponymous private ski run with a handle tow named "Mitey Mite".

Scrapyard Terrain Park, located near the lodge, offers ramps, rails, and other obstacles for skiers and snowboarders.

The resort includes 4 fixed-distance chairlifts, a handle tow for Cubby Corner, and an aerial tramway. There are 35 runs, the longest of which, Double Eagle II, is about 2 miles (3.2 km) long.

Located at the summit is the upper terminal building of the tramway, as well as the upper termini of Chairlifts #1, #2, and #3. The visitor center of the Cibola National Forest is also located in the terminal, as well as a ski patrol station. Adjacent to the terminal, at an elevation of over 10,300 feet (3,100 m), or "ten-three", is a fine-dining restaurant, TEN 3 (stylized as 10|3), formally known as High Finance Restaurant, tagged as the "highest fine-dining experience in the nation".

The resort is patroled by the Sandia Peak Ski Patrol (SPSP), a unit of the National Ski Patrol. Lodging for the resort is provided at Sandia Park to the east and in Albuquerque to the west. No camping is allowed in the forest.

== Activities ==
=== Winter ===
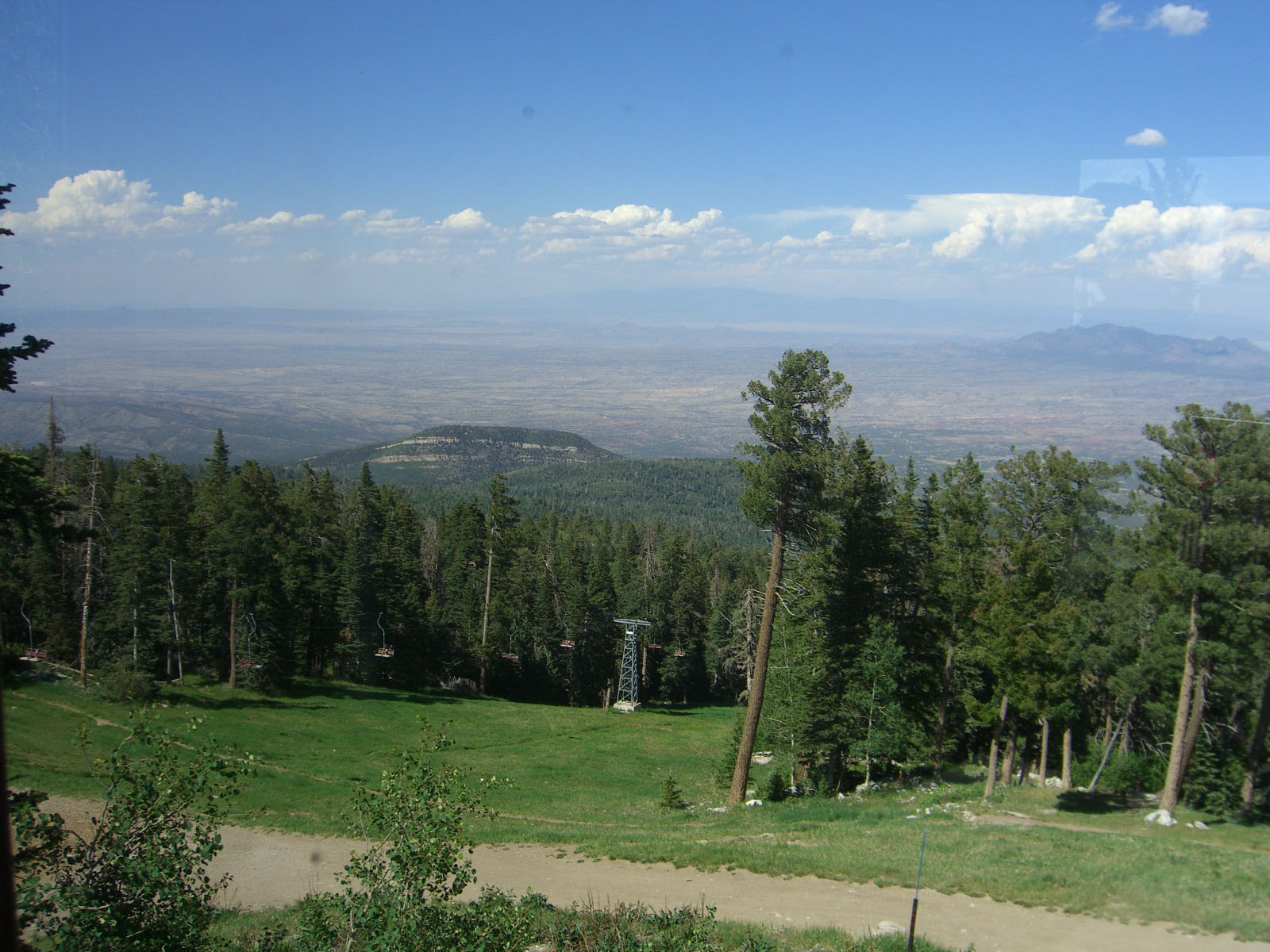
View to the northeast from the summit showing the Sangre de Cristo Mountains in the distance (center, just below the clouds)

Sandia Peak hosts skiers of all skills and ages. Ice skating, cross country, endurance skiing, and uphill and downhill skiing and snowboarding is accommodated at the resort. No tubes or sleds are allowed at the resort; a tubing and sledding "snow play area" is provided by the Forest Service across the highway from the resort at Capulin Spring. The Snow Sports School provides ski and snowboard lessons and the Cubby Corner school provides lessons to young children on a private slope. There is a shop for renting winter sports equipment at the ski lodge; those arriving via the tramway to the summit necessarily must bring their own equipment to ski. The resort routinely hosts races and competitions.

The resort grooms and maintains the snow surface, and can provide for manufacturing new snow if necessary.

=== Summer ===
There are numerous notable trails at the resort including the Grand Enchantment Trail, 10k Trail, Golden Eagle Trail, King of the Mountain, and the upper end of the popular La Luz Trail. The area hosts hiking, mountain biking, horseback riding, bird-watching, fine-dining, and scenic viewing in the summer months.

Chairlift #1 provides scenic rides throughout the off season, and lunches are hosted at both the base and top-of-tram restaurant. Tram rides are offered Thursday through Sunday year-around, including holidays, weather permitting. The summit serves as a jump point for hang gliding.

Additional planned summer activities include a climbing wall, ropes course, mountain bike trail, and the Four Seasons Activity Area.

==== Four Seasons Activity Area ====
An all seasons recreation area, dubbed the "Four Seasons Activity Area", will provide additional recreation at the resort year-around. The area will be located at the southwest part of the property, near the summit. Included will be two ziplines, one of which will closely follow Chairlift #2. The lift itself will be converted to foot traffic only, exclusively serving the activity area. A service yurt will provide additional food service.

A 4,200 foot (1,300 m) mountain coaster was also proposed for the activity area. The plans were drafted by the resort and approved by the Forest Service in 2017, and public input on the project was accepted until March 31, 2021. As proposed, riders would have descended a 2,825 foot (861 m) track at speeds of up to 25–30 miles per hour (40–48 km/h), limited by an eddy current brake. The project was paused in 2022 and was not pursued after the ski area came under new management.

== Sandia Peak Ski Area statistics ==
=== Elevation ===
- Base: 8,678 feet (2,650 m)
- Summit: 10,378 feet (3,160 m)
- Vertical Rise: 1,700 feet (520 m)

=== Developed Terrain ===
- Mountains: 1 (Sandia Peak)
- Skiable Area: 200 acres (0.81 km^{2})
- Trails: 53 total (23% beginner, 49% intermediate, 29% advanced)
- Terrain Parks: 1 (Scrapyard Park)
- Average Snowfall: 125 inches (320 cm) annually

=== Lifts ===
As of 2021, Sandia Peak has a total of 6 lifts.

1 aerial tramway

- Sandia Peak Tramway

4 double chairlifts

- Chairlift #1
- Chairlift #2
- Chairlift #3
- Beginner Chairlift #4

1 surface lifts

- "Mitey Mite" handle tow (Cubby Corner students only)

=== List of ski runs ===
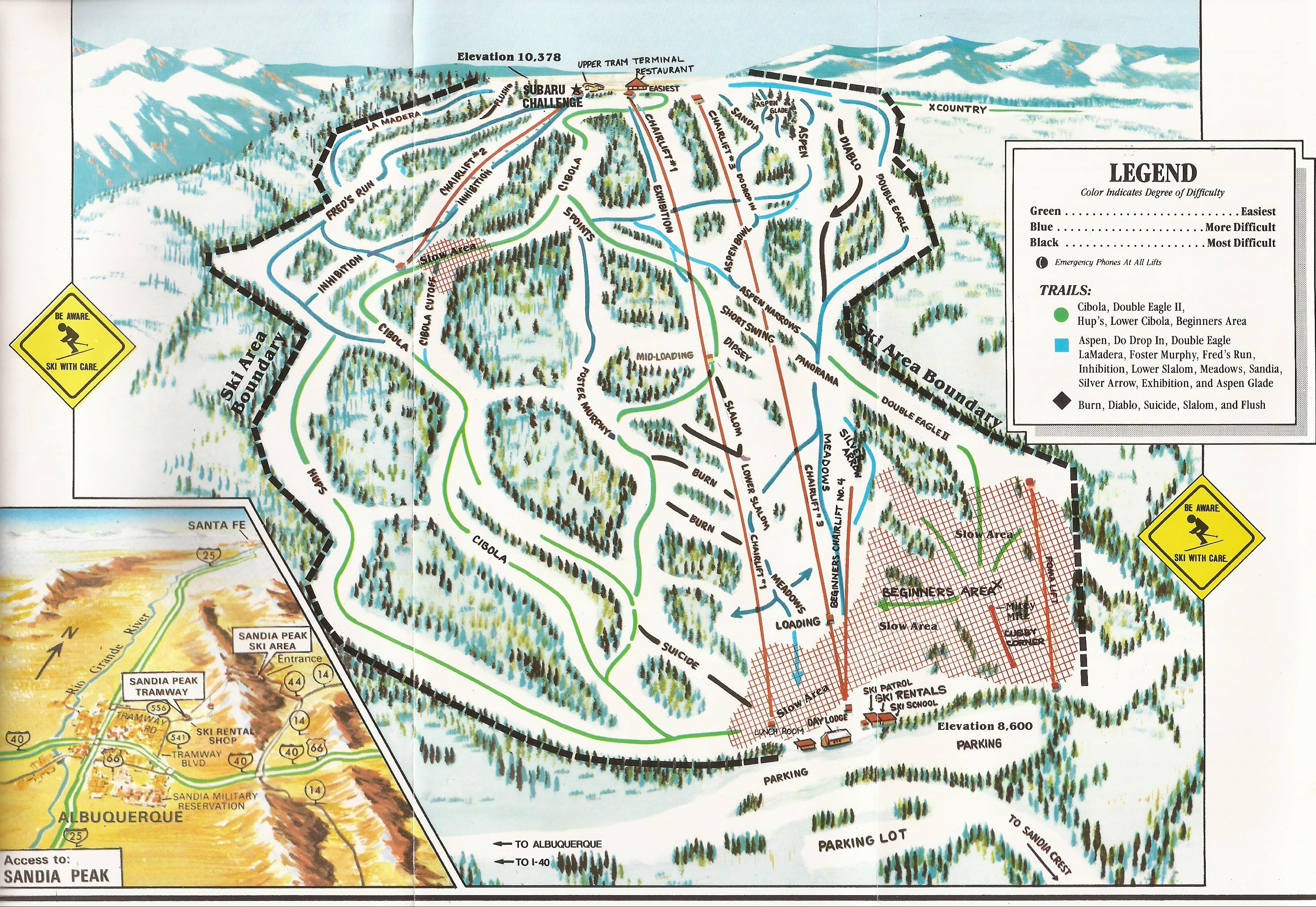
1988 resort map

The named ski runs at the resort include:

- Aspen
- Aspen Bowl
- Aspen Narrows
- Burn
- Cibola
- Cibola Cutt-Off
- Cibola Ridge
- Cubby Corner (Cubby Corner students only)
- Diablo
- Dipsey
- Do Drop In
- Double Eagle II
- Exhibition
- Foster Murphy
- Fred's Run
- Greg's Run
- Hups
- Inhibition
- La Madera
- Little Suicide
- Lower Slalom
- Prohibition
- Race Arena
- Rob's Run
- Sandia
- Short Swing
- Silver Arrow
- Slalom
- Suicide
- To Chair 2

== See also ==
- List of New Mexico ski resorts
- Ski Santa Fe
- Ski Apache
