= Mogollon Baldy Lookout Cabin =

- U.S. National Register of Historic Places
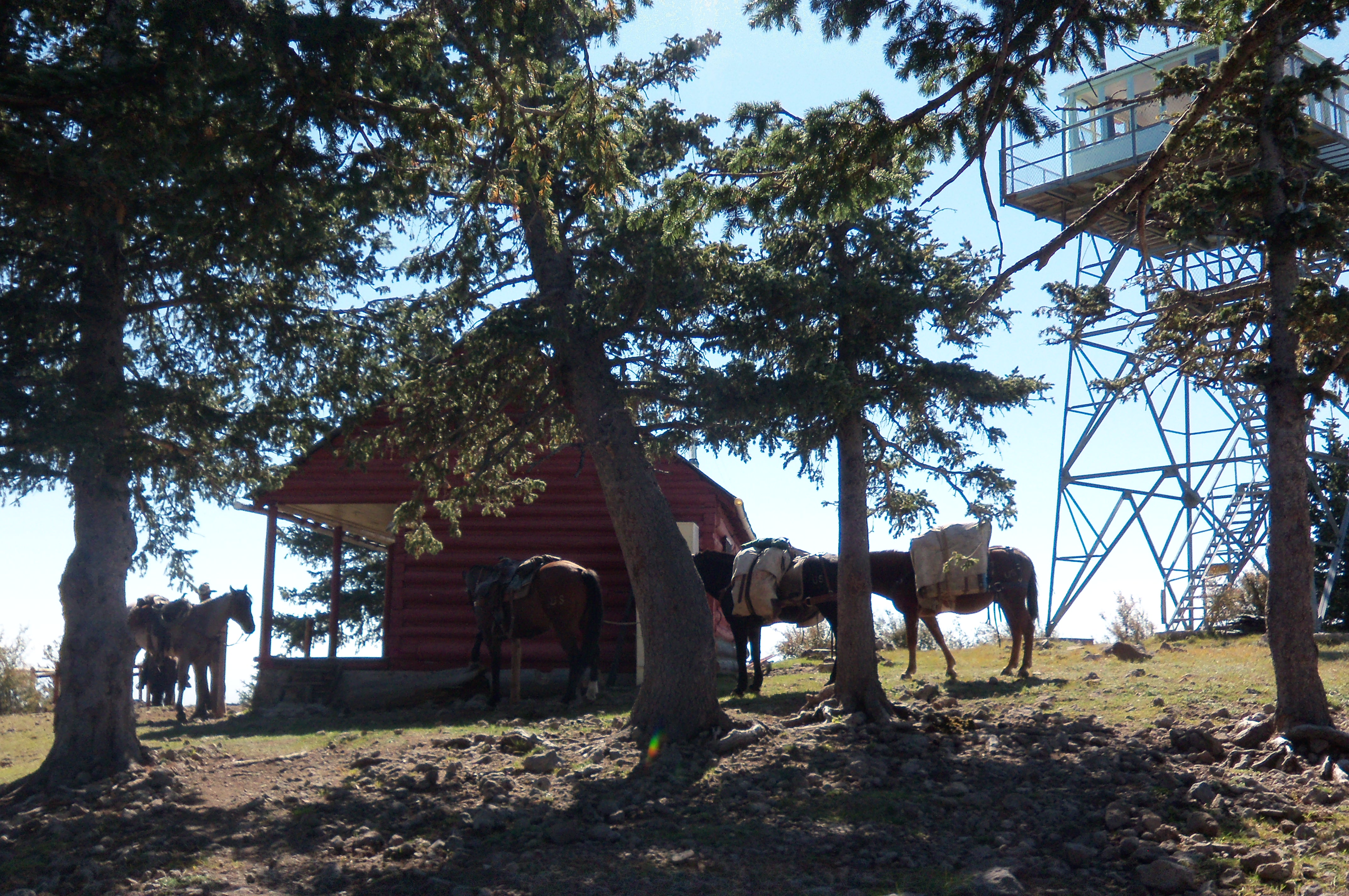

- Location within New Mexico
- Location: Gila National Forest, Mogollon Baldy Peak, New Mexico
- Coordinates: 33.271660°N 108.594354°W
- Area: less than one acre
- Built: 1923
- MPS: National Forest Fire Lookouts in the Southwestern Region TR
- NRHP reference No.: 87002470
- Added to NRHP: January 28, 1988

The Mogollon Baldy Lookout Cabin, in Gila National Forest on Mogollon Baldy peak, in New Mexico, was built in 1923. It was listed on the National Register of Historic Places in 1988.

It is a log cabin close to the lookout tower near the peak. The listing does not include the lookout tower itself.

NRHP photos but not NRHP nomination doc:

It is located on Mogollon Baldy, a peak in the Mogollons. The highest peak in the Mogollons, Whitewater Baldy, is 4.6 miles (7.4 km) to the northwest.
