= Sandia Crest =

Highpoint of the Sandia-Manzano Mountains in New Mexico, United States

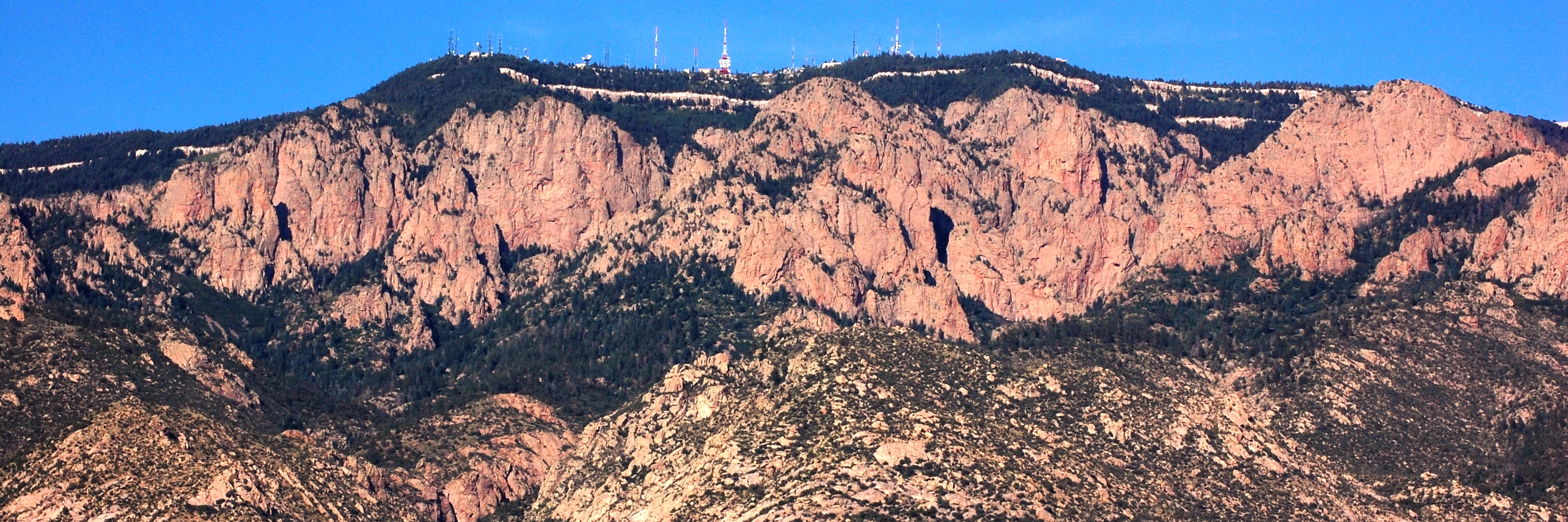
- Closeup of Sandia Crest from the west, July 2007

Highest point
- Elevation: 10,679 ft (3,255 m)
- Prominence: 4,098 ft (1,249 m)
- Coordinates: 35°12′36.41″N 106°26′55.14″W

Dimensions
- Length: 5 mi (8 km) N-S

Naming
- Etymology: Watermelon (Spanish)
- Nickname(s): Sandia Peak, the Crest
- Native name: Posu gai hoo-oo (Southern Tiwa)
- English translation: "Where water slides down arroyo"
- Defining authority: United States Forest Service

Geography
- Country: United States
- State: New Mexico
- County: Bernalillo
- Nearest city: Albuquerque
- Parent range: Sandia–Manzano Mountains
- Biome: Hudsonian Zone

Geology
- Formed by: Rio Grande rift
- Orogeny: Laramidian
- Rock age: 300 Ma
- Mountain type: Tilted fault-block
- Rock type: Sedimentary

Climbing
- Easiest route: Grand Enchantment Trail
- Normal route: La Luz Trail
- Access: Albuquerque, Sandia Pueblo

Sandia Crest, also known locally as Sandia Peak or simply as the Crest, is a mountain ridge that, at 10,679 feet (3,255 m), is the highpoint of the Sandia–Manzano Mountains, and is located in the Sandia Mountains of Bernalillo County, New Mexico, United States. Instead of a true summit or topographic peak, this range climbs to a long ridge line. To the east, the range slopes down from the Crest and merges into the plains below. On the west side of the Crest is a cliff; the range dramatically drops over 4,000 feet (1,000 metres) in elevation over 2 miles (3 kilometres) of horizontal distance to the Rio Grande Valley and city of Albuquerque below. It is within the Sandia Ranger District of the Cibola National Forest. The Crest features a viewing area with a shop and visitor center, telecommunications transmitters, the popular La Luz Trail, the Sandia Mountain Wilderness, and the summit of Sandia Peak Ski Area and the Sandia Peak Tramway, which is the longest aerial tramway in the Americas.

== Etymology ==
Sandia Crest is named for its host range, the Sandia Mountains. Sandía means "watermelon" in Spanish, and is popularly believed to be a reference to the reddish color of the mountains at sunset. Also, when viewed from the west, the profile of the mountains is a long ridge, with a thin zone of green conifers near the top, suggesting the "rind" of the watermelon. However, as Robert Julyan notes: "the most likely explanation is the one believed by the Sandia Puebloans: the Spaniards, when they encountered the Pueblo in 1540, called it Sandia, because they thought the squash gourds growing there were watermelons, and the name Sandia soon was transferred to the mountains east of the pueblo.",

The earliest recorded use of "Sandia Peak" seems to have been from local retired lawyer and skier Robert Nordhaus, who founded La Madera Ski Area in the mountains in 1936. Nordhaus installed the first chairlift to the Crest in 1962, and for the '62–63 ski season, he opened the resort as Sandia Peak Ski Area and applied the name to the summit, a southern spur of the Crest. When Nordhaus opened the tram in 1966, the tram also took the name of "Sandia Peak".

== Description ==
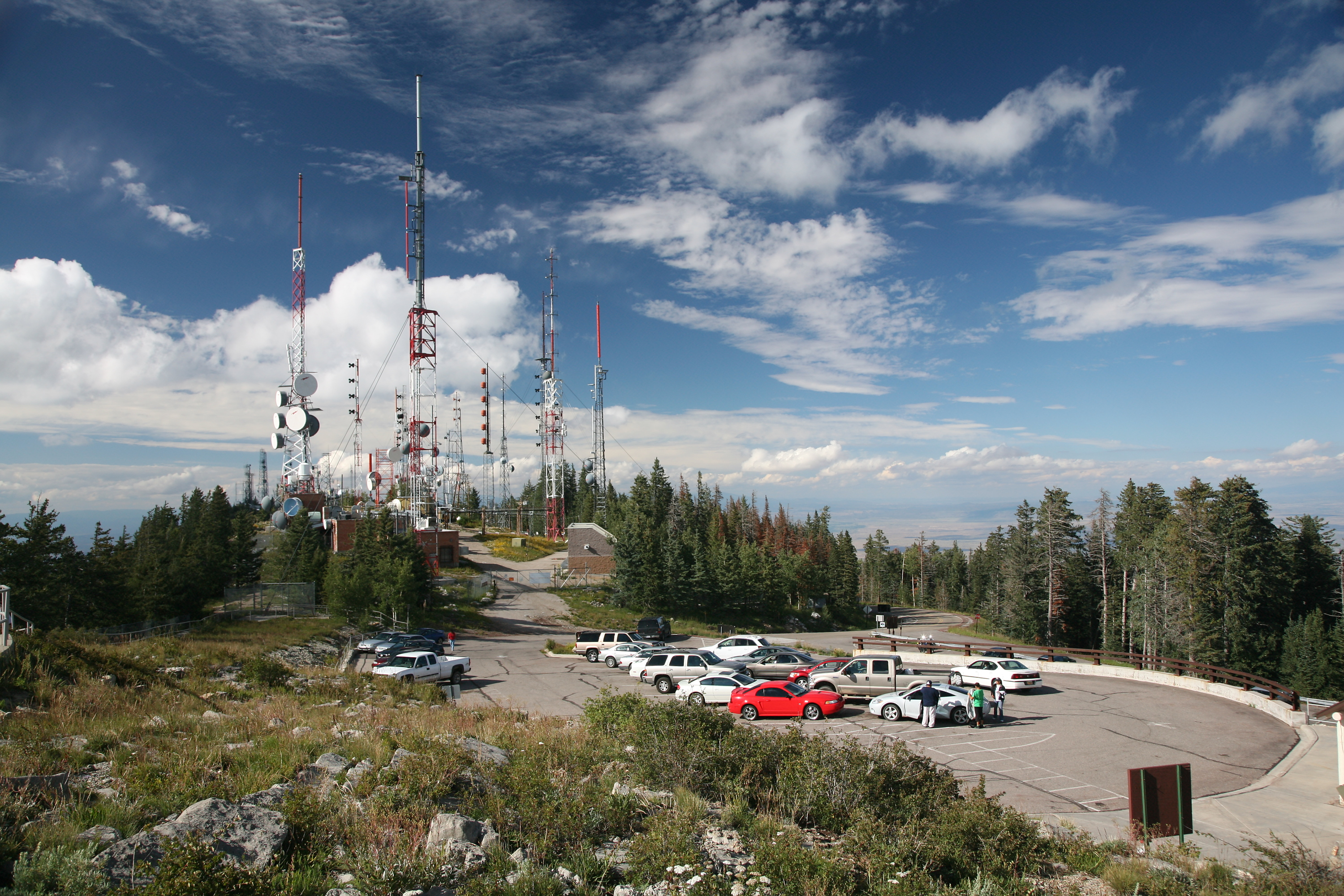
Part of the parking lot to the viewing area and radio transmitters on Sandia Crest, September 2008

Sandia Crest is a long ridgeline at the highpoint of the Sandia Mountains. The Crest is heavily forested, mostly with spruce and fir. There are communication radio antennae of various radio and television stations situated at the top.

Located on the Crest at the western terminus of Sandia Crest Rd (NM 536) is a scenic viewing area, the Sandia Crest House, which includes a gift shop, café, visitor center, plaza, parking lot, restrooms, and informational plaques.

Located at the southern spur of the Crest is the summit of Sandia Peak Ski Area. The ski summit is dubbed "Sandia Peak", and features a fine-dining restaurant, TEN 3 (stylized as 10|3), named for the elevation it is situated at, "ten-three" (10,300 feet (3,140 m)). Chairlifts #1-3 service the Crest.

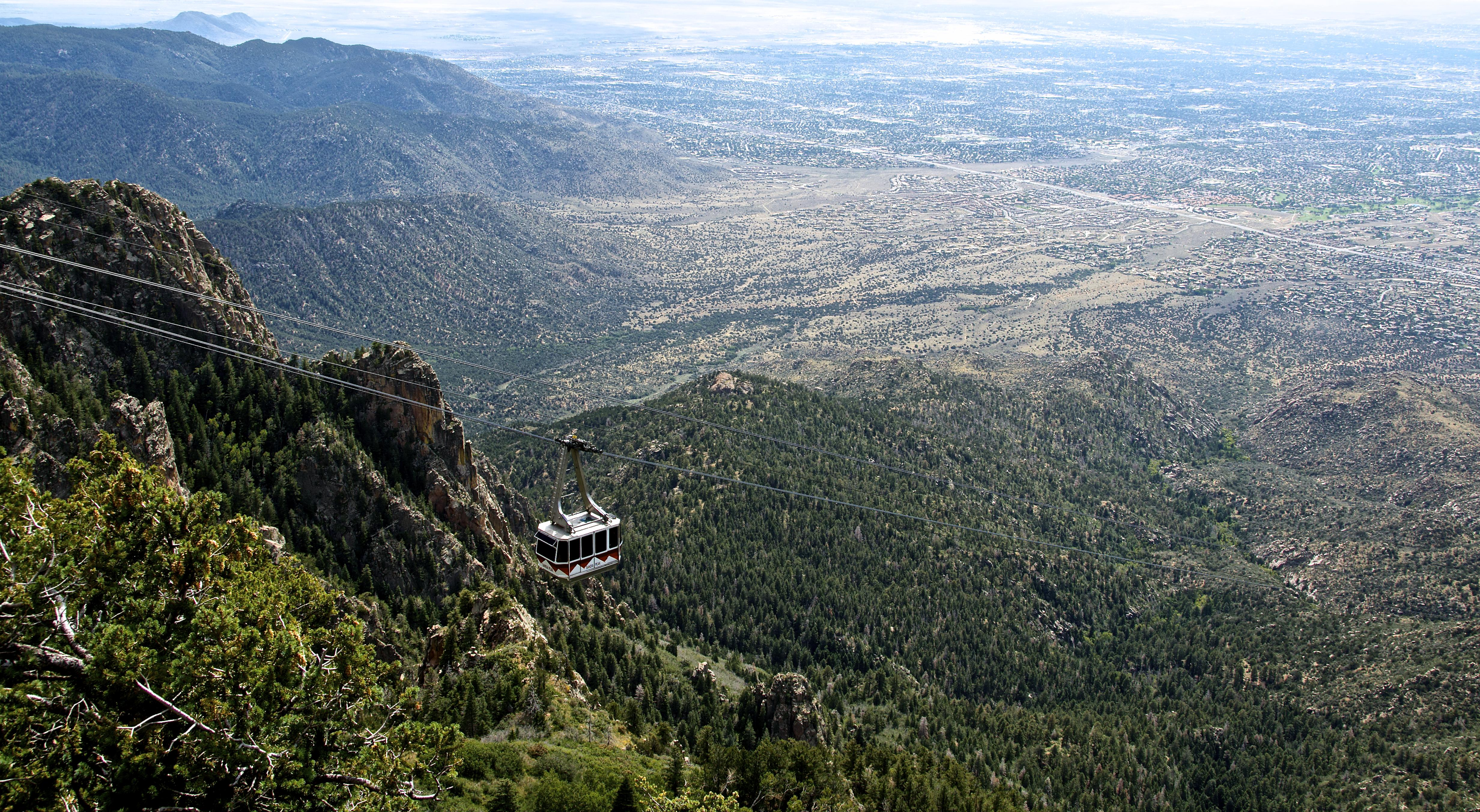
View from Sandia Crest on the city of Albuquerque and Sandia Peak Tramway

The ski resort also features the Sandia Peak Tramway which takes riders on a 15 minute "flight" from the eastern edge of Albuquerque to Sandia Peak. It is the longest aerial tramway in the Americas, and was the longest in the world from 1966 to 2010. It features the worlds third-longest single span.

The Kiwanis Cabin, the ruins of the cabin of the Kiwanis Group of the Civilian Conservation Corps, is located on the Crest between the Sandia Crest House and the ski resort, and is a popular site with hikers. The La Luz Trail connects the Crest to the city, and the Grand Enchantment Trail traverses the crest from north to south.

== History ==
In 1819, then Governor of Santa Fe de Nuevo México Facundo Melgares established a land grant in the mountains, including the town of San Miguel de Carnuel and the San Antonio Pueblo. The land grant used Sandia Crest as its western boundary.

In 1927, the US Forest Service completed a dirt road to Sandia Crest. The roadway was paved in 1960 to improve access to La Madera Ski Area, built in 1936 by Robert Nordhaus (a retired lawyer and father of Nobel Prize-winning economist William Nordhaus) and famous balloonist Ben Abruzzo. The new road turned "several hours of potholes and mud to an easy 45 minute drive" to the resort. In 1962 Nordhaus changed the name of the resort to Sandia Peak Ski Area, the first recorded use of "Sandia Peak".

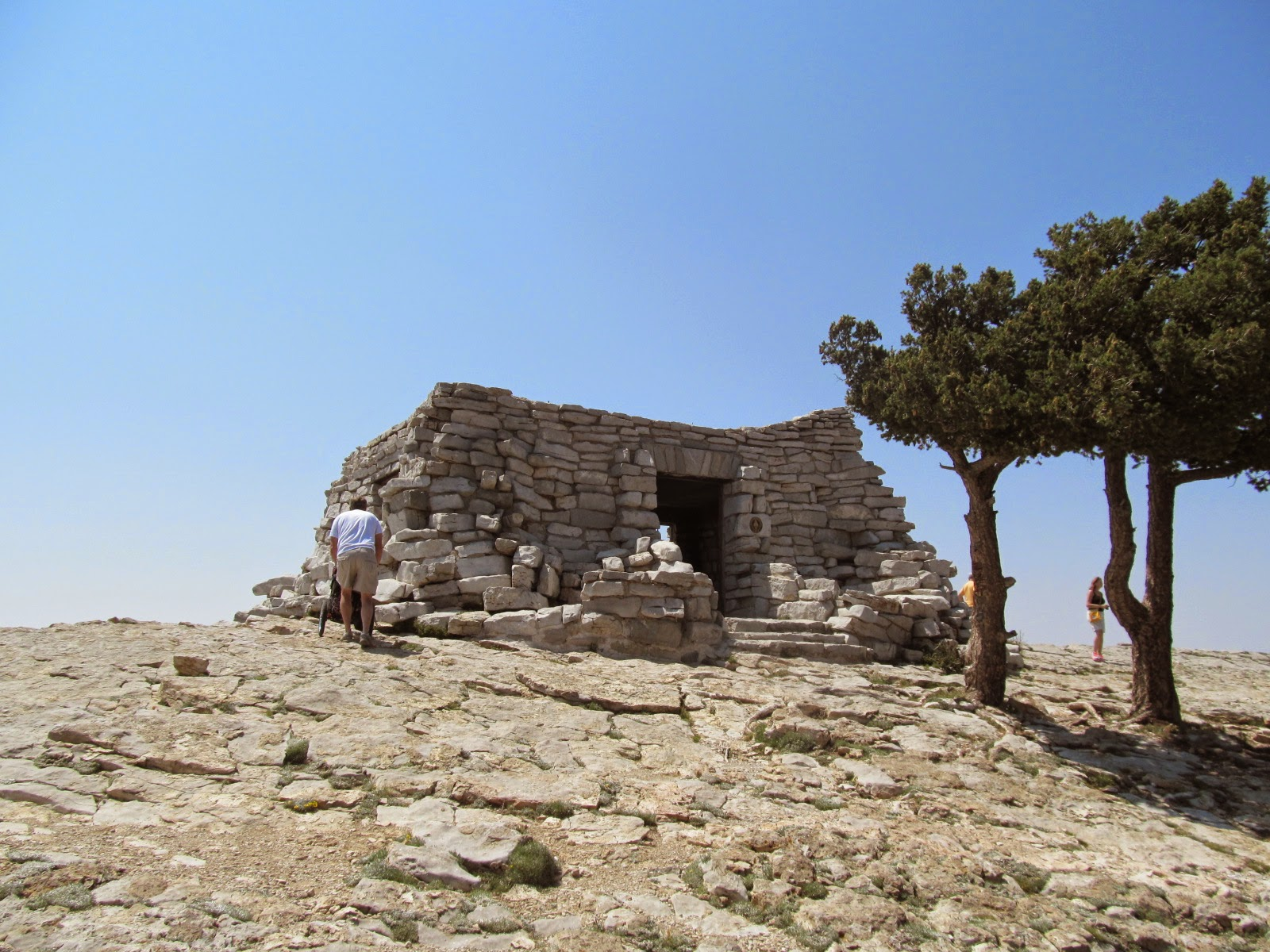
Kiwanis cabin, August 2012

In 1930, the Kiwanis Group of the Civilian Conservation Corps built a stone cabin on the crest in pueblo-style architecture, overlooking the Rio Grande Valley. The ruins of the cabin are today a popular site with hikers.

in 1962, regional forester Fred H. Kennedy drafted a recreational use plan that would have dramatically developed the Sandia Mountain Wilderness for primarily recreational use. Included with the plan was Skyline Drive, a scenic highway that would have run for about 8 miles (13 kilometres) from La Madera Ski Area in the south, along the crest line to U.S. Route 85 west of Placitas, a stretch now served by New Mexico State Road 165 via Capulin Canyon. The Albuquerque Wildlife and Conservation Association, the New Mexico Department of Game and Fish, and the New Mexico Mountain Club had all registered their opposition by to the plan in 1965.

"These organizations felt that the road might have a detrimental effect on the habitat of the Rocky Mountain bighorn sheep. As a result, the project was postponed."

Also included with the plan were roadside recreation areas and three aerial tramways. The routing for Skyline Drive was adjusted twice at an August 8, 1966 public meeting, and by autumn of 1969, 5 miles (8 kilometres) of forest along the crest was cleared for the new road. Alarmed locals started a campaign which included postcards and petitions, and successfully halted construction. Author James A. Morris wrote of the construction of the road:

"The road clearing, though scarring the mountainside, had its greatest impact upon the minds and sensibilities of many people . . . the ragged swath, nearly two hundred feet wide, zigzagged among the trees down the eastern slope. The soil was exposed, rocks were tumbled about, and stumps with their roots upturned appeared to beseech the Sandia deities for mercy. The mountains themselves would eventually reclaim the land and mend the wound in their flank, but the road would not survive the aroused reaction that opposed the construction of any skyline drive."

The scar from the road clearing is still visible on the ground and in satellite images as of 2021.

In 1964, Nordhaus was inspired to build an aerial tramway from Albuquerque to the Crest after seeing other trams during a trip to Europe. Bell Engineering of Lucerne, Switzerland, was contracted to design and construct the tramway. Construction lasted two years, and was aided by over 5,000 helicopter trips. Testing took an additional 60 days. It entered service on May 7, 1966.

In 2006, the city of Albuquerque celebrated its tricentennial, and installed a display of 300 high-power LED lamps atop the Crest. The display remained on the Crest for 18 months, from April 23, 2005 to October 6, 2006.

In 2017, the US Forest Service adopted plans outlined in the Sandia Peak Ski Co.'s 2016 master plan for a "Four Seasons Activity Area" at the Crest, including a food service yurt, two ziplines, and a mountain coaster (a type of tracked sled ride), to be built in the summer of 2022. When finished, it will provide additional year-around recreation at the ski resort. The coaster would have had a station near the tramway terminal on the Crest. It would have been the first mountain coaster in New Mexico and the southernmost in the US at the time. Due to intense local opposition and the high costs expected for evaluating the environmental impact on the mountain, the project was canceled.

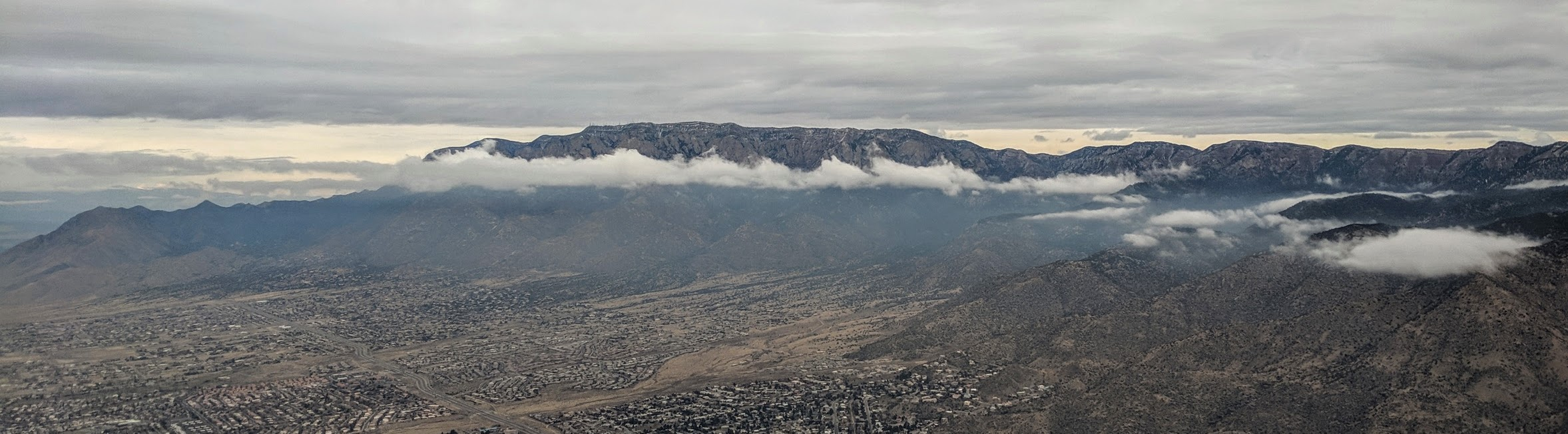
Sandia Crest above the clouds with Albuquerque in the foreground in 2018

== Geology ==
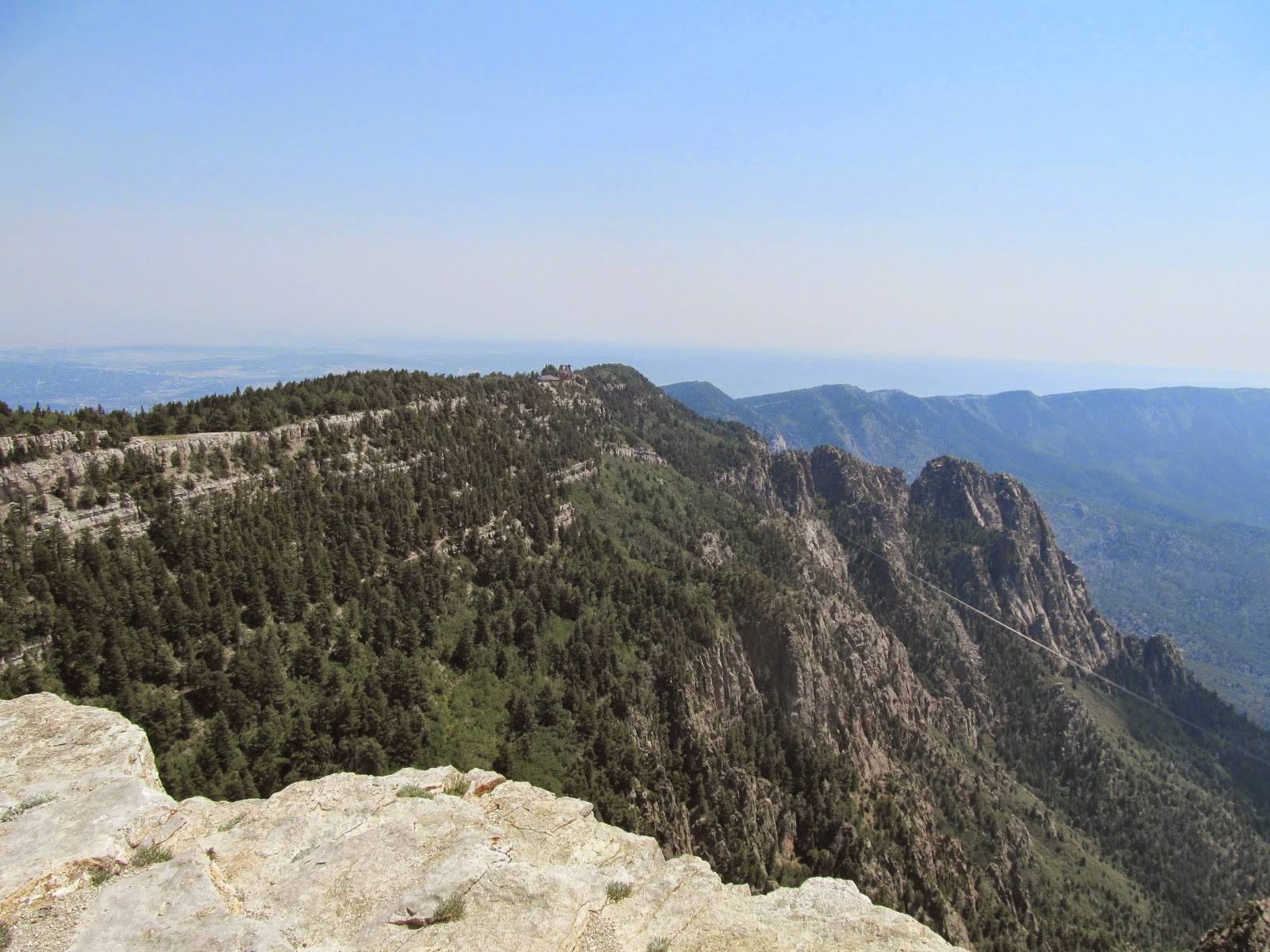
Hudsonian Life Zone Forest along the Crest. The thin white line to the right is the cables of the Sandia Peak Tramway, August 2012.

The Sandia Mountains are a fault block range, on the eastern edge of the Rio Grande rift Valley. The Sandias were uplifted in the last ten million years as part of the formation of the Rio Grande rift. They form the eastern boundary of the Albuquerque Basin. The tilting of the block is most obvious from the Crest since it slopes down gently to the east and drops off dramatically to the west. The Crest consists mainly of an outcrop of limestone overlaying the Sandia granite, with a radiometric age of 300±12 Ma.

== Ecology ==
Sandia Crest is located in the Cibola National Forest's Sandia Ranger District. Hudsonian Life Zone coniferous forest dominates the flora present at the Crest. Tree species present on the crest include Engelmann spruce, white fir, and ponderosa pine.

Fauna that frequent the crest include elk, mule deer, New Mexico black bears, raccoons, ring-tailed cats, bobcats, and various species of squirrel. Birds present include bald eagles, Steller's jays, pinyon jays, various finches, and canyon wrens

== Climate ==
Climate data for Sandia Crest 35.2153 N, 106.4521 W, Elevation: 10,433 ft (3,180 m) (1991–2020 normals)
Month	Jan	Feb	Mar	Apr	May	Jun	Jul	Aug	Sep	Oct	Nov	Dec	Year
Mean daily maximum °F (°C)	35.0 (1.7)	36.7 (2.6)	43.2 (6.2)	49.7 (9.8)	59.6 (15.3)	70.4 (21.3)	71.8 (22.1)	69.5 (20.8)	63.3 (17.4)	55.0 (12.8)	44.9 (7.2)	35.7 (2.1)	52.9 (11.6)
Daily mean °F (°C)	27.0 (−2.8)	27.8 (−2.3)	33.8 (1.0)	36.4 (2.4)	45.8 (7.7)	55.9 (13.3)	58.3 (14.6)	56.6 (13.7)	50.9 (10.5)	42.2 (5.7)	36.2 (2.3)	27.2 (−2.7)	41.5 (5.3)
Mean daily minimum °F (°C)	18.9 (−7.3)	18.8 (−7.3)	24.4 (−4.2)	23.2 (−4.9)	32.0 (0.0)	41.4 (5.2)	44.8 (7.1)	43.8 (6.6)	38.4 (3.6)	29.4 (−1.4)	27.5 (−2.5)	18.8 (−7.3)	30.1 (−1.0)
Average precipitation inches (mm)	2.47 (63)	2.01 (51)	2.48 (63)	1.30 (33)	0.95 (24)	1.08 (27)	3.27 (83)	3.04 (77)	2.42 (61)	1.78 (45)	1.67 (42)	2.14 (54)	24.61 (623)
Source: PRISM Climate Group

Climate data for Sandia Crest, New Mexico (1981–2010)
Month	Jan	Feb	Mar	Apr	May	Jun	Jul	Aug	Sep	Oct	Nov	Dec	Year
Record high °F (°C)	48 (9)	49 (9)	56 (13)	60 (16)	72 (22)	82 (28)	84 (29)	80 (27)	79 (26)	71 (22)	62 (17)	59 (15)	84 (29)
Mean daily maximum °F (°C)	26.8 (−2.9)	28.3 (−2.1)	32.6 (0.3)	42.2 (5.7)	53.2 (11.8)	63.9 (17.7)	66.3 (19.1)	62.9 (17.2)	57.1 (13.9)	47.8 (8.8)	36.6 (2.6)	29.5 (−1.4)	45.6 (7.6)
Daily mean °F (°C)	20.0 (−6.7)	21.2 (−6.0)	24.9 (−3.9)	33.5 (0.8)	43.6 (6.4)	53.5 (11.9)	56.9 (13.8)	54.2 (12.3)	48.9 (9.4)	40.2 (4.6)	29.4 (−1.4)	22.5 (−5.3)	37.4 (3.0)
Mean daily minimum °F (°C)	13.1 (−10.5)	14.1 (−9.9)	17.3 (−8.2)	24.7 (−4.1)	33.9 (1.1)	43.1 (6.2)	47.4 (8.6)	45.6 (7.6)	40.7 (4.8)	32.5 (0.3)	22.2 (−5.4)	15.5 (−9.2)	29.2 (−1.6)
Record low °F (°C)	−20 (−29)	−12 (−24)	−10 (−23)	−2 (−19)	8 (−13)	22 (−6)	29 (−2)	24 (−4)	19 (−7)	−2 (−19)	−10 (−23)	−19 (−28)	−20 (−29)
Average precipitation inches (mm)	1.96 (50)	1.91 (49)	2.34 (59)	1.26 (32)	0.91 (23)	0.95 (24)	3.19 (81)	3.38 (86)	1.82 (46)	1.83 (46)	1.39 (35)	2.01 (51)	22.95 (582)
Average snowfall inches (cm)	19.3 (49)	23.0 (58)	23.3 (59)	10.7 (27)	3.8 (9.7)	0.1 (0.25)	0.0 (0.0)	0.0 (0.0)	0.1 (0.25)	5.3 (13)	10.0 (25)	20.7 (53)	116.3 (294.2)
Source: WRCC

== Climbing ==
Sandia Crest is a popular rock climbing destination that contains bouldering, sport, and traditional multipitch routes. Climbing began during the 1930s and 1940s, with more climbers arriving in the 1950s, when in 1959 the Needle was climbed for the first time. The named climbing areas include the Shield (one of the largest cliff faces in the Sandia Mountains), the Needle, Muralla Grande (features traditional routes), the Chimney, the Sentinel, La Cueva Domes/Gemstone Slabs, the Pulpit, and the Thumb. Most of the technical climbing routes are accessible either from the Crest, or by hiking up the La Luz Trail.

== See also ==
- List of mountain peaks of New Mexico
- Sandia Mountains
- Manzano Mountains
