= Grand Enchantment Trail =

Long-distance hiking trail in the United States

- Length: 770 mi (1,240 km)
- Location: United States: Arizona and New Mexico
- Trailheads: Phoenix, Arizona; Albuquerque, New Mexico
- Use: Hiking; Horse riding Mountain biking
- Highest point: Mogollon Baldy, 10,770 ft (3,280 m)
- Lowest point: Gila River, 1,700 ft (520 m)
- Difficulty: Easy to strenuous
- Sights: Sonoran Desert; Chihuahuan Desert; Sky Islands; Riparian canyons Continental Divide; Cliff dwellings Hot springs Ghost towns
- Hazards: Dehydration; Desert heat & sun Mountain snowpack & highwater fords Venomous snakes & scorpions Primitive trail conditions

The Grand Enchantment Trail (acronym "GET") is a wilderness recreation trail running 770 miles (1,240 km) between Phoenix, Arizona and Albuquerque, New Mexico. It crosses the Arizona Trail and Continental Divide Trail and at Albuquerque it meets the Rio Grande Trail and El Camino Real de Tierra Adentro.
