= Sandia Mountain Wilderness =

Protected area in New Mexico, United States

- IUCN category Ib (wilderness area)
- Location within the United States
- Location: Bernalillo – Sandoval counties, New Mexico, United States
- Nearest city: Albuquerque, New Mexico
- Coordinates: 35°12′0″N 106°27′0″W
- Area: 37,877 acres (15,328 ha)
- Established: 1978
- Visitors: 2 million (in 2000?)
- Governing body: United States Forest Service

Sandia Mountain Wilderness, part of Cibola National Forest, is located east of Albuquerque, New Mexico, and comprises much of Sandia Mountains. It became part of the National Wilderness Preservation System in 1978 by an act of the United States Congress and has a total of 37,877 acres (15,328 ha).

The wilderness is under the authority of the United States Forest Service. Because of its proximity to Albuquerque, it has one of the most used trail systems in the state. Most tourists access the wilderness area either by way of the Sandia Aerial Tramway or by driving by way of the Sandia Crest National Scenic Byway.

== Geography ==
The Sandia Mountains Wilderness Area comprises the Sandia Mountain Range that runs from north of Albuquerque along the eastern side of the city in central New Mexico. The range itself is rather small, only spanning about 18 miles (29 km) from north to south, and 8 miles (13 km), east to west. Almost the entire range is part of the Cibola National Forest area, including the Sandia Mountain Wilderness. The Wilderness area itself lies mostly on the western side of the mountains with a few trails and areas that cross over onto the eastern side. To the south there is the Manzanita Mountains that form a low ridge separating the Manzano Mountain range (and the Manzano Wilderness) to the south and the Sandia Mountains to the north.

=== Geology ===
The dominating rock type in the Sandia Mountains is granite with a ribbon of limestone running along the crest.

== History ==
The Sandia Mountain Wilderness is part of the 109-million-acre (440,000 km^{2}) National Wilderness Preservation System that was created by the US Congress with the Wilderness Act of 1964, though it did not become a part of the system until 1978. In the nineteen eighties, several changes increased the boundary of the Sandia Mountain Wilderness to its current size.

The 1980 amendment was used to add certain portions of the Cibola National Forest to the Wilderness area. In 1982, the boundaries were changed to transfer some of the wilderness land to Albuquerque, but the new acreage was never declared. Finally, in 1984, the San Juan Basin located in the northwest corner of New Mexico was put under the protection of the Wilderness Act and made a part of the Sandia Mountain Wilderness. Since then, no new boundary amendments have been made.

Some of the most common animals seen in the Sandia Wilderness are mule deer, black bears, raccoons, bobcats, and various species of squirrel. There are also many birds of prey that live and migrate within the Sandia Mountain Wilderness including golden eagles and various species of hawks. Other birds such as roadrunners, Steller's Jays, ravens, and canyon wrens can also be found on in the mountains. The upper parts of the Sandia Mountains have a lot of tree cover made up mostly of firs and spruce trees, with ponderosas and conifers inhabiting the middle elevations.

== Paths and trails ==
The Sandia Mountain Wilderness has one of the longest tramways in the world, traveling 2.7 miles (4.3 km) and climbing nearly 4,000 feet (1,200 m) to the crest of the Sandias. The Sandia Peak Aerial Tramway was designed by a team of Swiss engineers that had designed similar systems in the Alps. The tram has never had an accident or injury since its opening in 1966. The tram passes two towers along its trip at elevations of 7,010 feet (2,140 m) and 8,750 feet (2,670 m). The top terminal is at an elevation of 10,300 feet (3,100 m).

Once at the crest of the Sandia Mountains, there are approximately 26.5 miles (42.6 km) of trail that run along the ridge (known as Crest Trail) at an average elevation of 10,000 feet (3,000 m). In addition to Crest Trail, the Sandia Mountain Wilderness has around 117 miles (188 km) worth of trails that are maintained by the Forest Service.
