= Sandia Peak Tramway =

Aerial tramway in New Mexico, United States

Sandia Peak Aerial Tramway
- Sandia Peak Ski Area
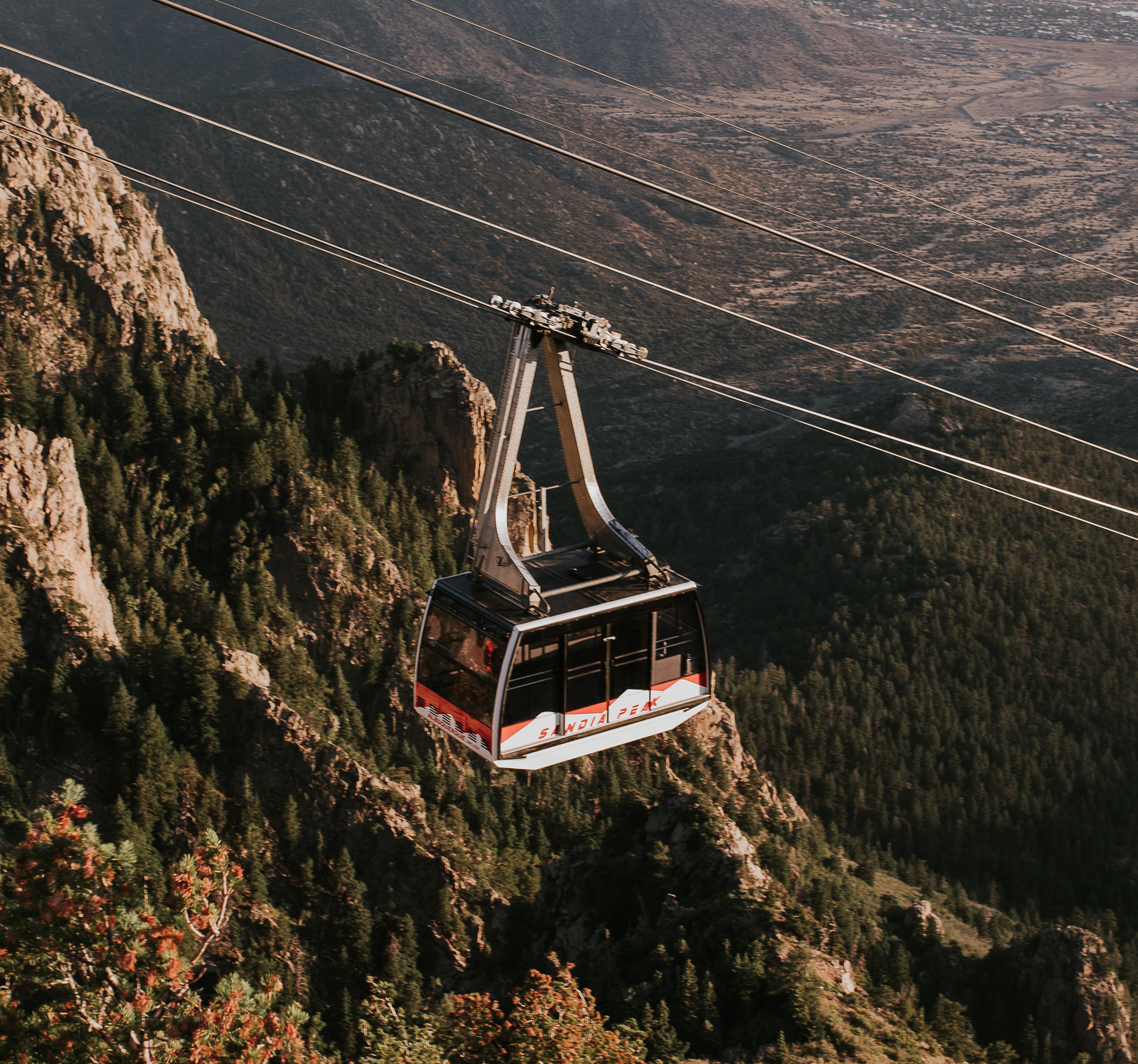
- New 2016 tram car
- Interactive map of Sandia Peak Aerial Tramway

Overview
- Status: Operational
- Character: Recreational
- Location: Albuquerque, New Mexico
- Country: United States
- Coordinates: 35°11′26″N 106°28′46″W
- Termini: Albuquerque; Sandia Peak
- No. of stations: 2
- Open: May 7, 1966; 60 years ago
- Website: sandiapeak.com

Operation
- Owner: Sandia Peak Ski Co.
- Operator: Sandia Peak Ski Co.
- Operating times: Thu-Mon 9am-8pm
- Trips daily: 10,050 tram trips/year
- Fare: $33 Adult roundtrip

Technical features
- Aerial lift type: Double Reversible Jigback Aerial Tramway
- Manufactured by: Bell Engineering
- Line length: 2.7 miles (4.3 km)
- No. of support towers: 2
- No. of cables: 7
- Cable diameter: Cable diameter 4 x 40mm lock coil track cables, 2 x 32 mm stranded haul cable, 1x 18 mm stranded Emergency Cable
- Installed power: 600 HP DC electric winch; Ford industrial engine (evacuation drive)
- Operating speed: 20 ft/s (13.6 mph; 21.9 km/h)

The Sandia Peak Tramway is an aerial tramway, adjacent to Albuquerque, New Mexico, in the United States. It stretches from the northeast edge of the city to Sandia Peak, on the ridge line of the Sandia Mountains and has the world's third longest single span. It is the longest aerial tram in the Americas, and was the longest in the world from 1966 until being surpassed in 2010 by the Wings of Tatev in Armenia.

== History ==
The Sandia Peak Ski Company was founded by Ben Abruzzo (a balloonist) and Robert Nordhaus (the father of William Nordhaus, a Nobel Prize–winning economist). Nordhaus was inspired to build a tram to the ski slope after seeing other trams during a ski trip to Switzerland. Bell Engineering, of Lucerne, Switzerland, built the tramway. The project took over 5,000 helicopter trips, airlifting workers and materials. The tram cars pass over two towers, the second of which required over 2,000 helicopter trips to build. The tramway has carried more than 12 million passengers since its maiden voyage, on May 7, 1966. New tram cars were installed in 1986, and new track cables in 2009. New tram cars were again installed in May 2016.

=== New Year 2022 incident ===
On New Year's Eve, 2021, a winter storm caused the emergency cable to ice over and droop onto the track cables, causing the tramway to stop mid-course. Nineteen employees from TEN 3, the restaurant at the top terminal, and a Sandia Peak tram-cabin operator were aboard the downhill tram car evacuating the restaurant for the approaching storm, and were trapped for over 17 hours. A cabin operator was stranded in the uphill tram car. Despite wind and snow, all were rescued, without injury, on the afternoon of January 1, 2022. Members of the Albuquerque Mountain Rescue Council helped the passengers rappel down the upper tower and hike to a point where they could be rescued by a Bernalillo County Sheriff's Office helicopter.

== Description ==
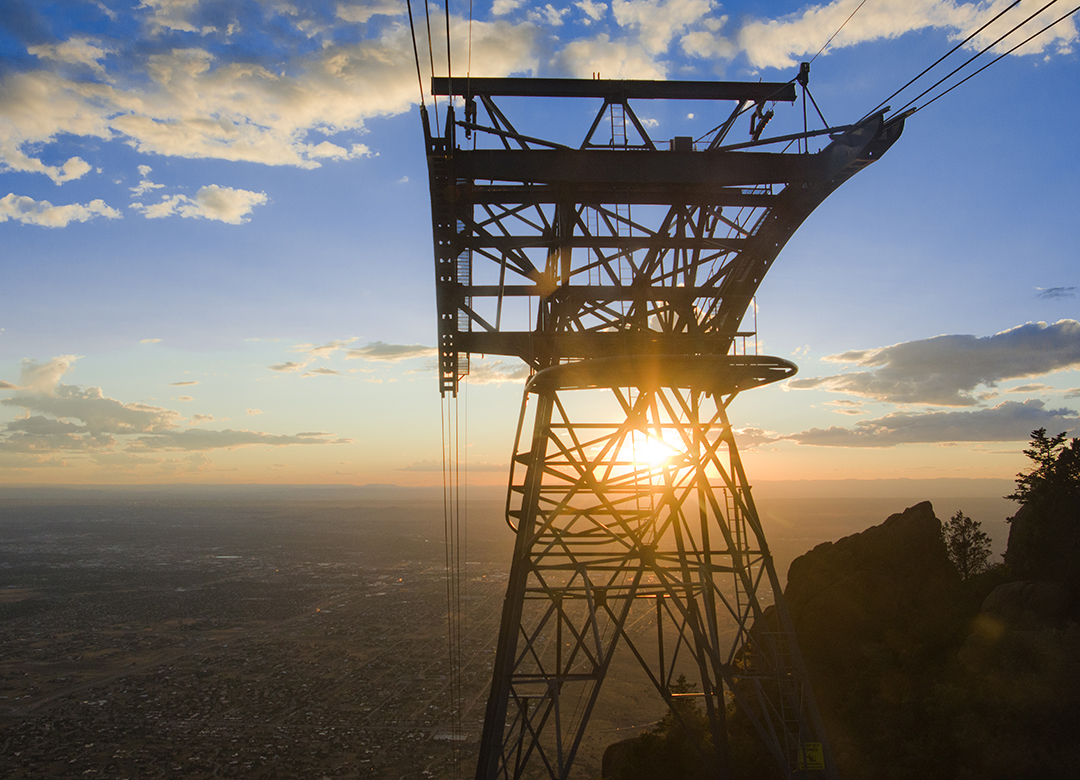
Sunset through the Tramway’s second tower

The tram is a type known as a "double reversible jigback aerial tramway," where "jigback" implies that when one tram car is ascending, the other is descending. Its two cars are capable of carrying 55 passengers each and have numerous safety and backup systems, such as multiple emergency braking systems and a grounding system that ensures the safety of passengers in the event of a lightning strike. The tramway ascends the steep western side of the highest portion of the Sandia Mountains, from a base elevation of 6,559 feet (1,999 m) to a top elevation of 10,378 feet (3,163 m). A trip up the mountain takes 15 minutes to ascend 3,819 ft (1,164 m), and the normal operating speed of the tram is 20 feet per second (13.6 mph; 21.9 km/h). Approximately four "flights" leave every hour from the base and top termini. The viewshed from the tram includes all of Albuquerque and roughly 11,000 square miles (28,000 km^{2}) of the New Mexico countryside.

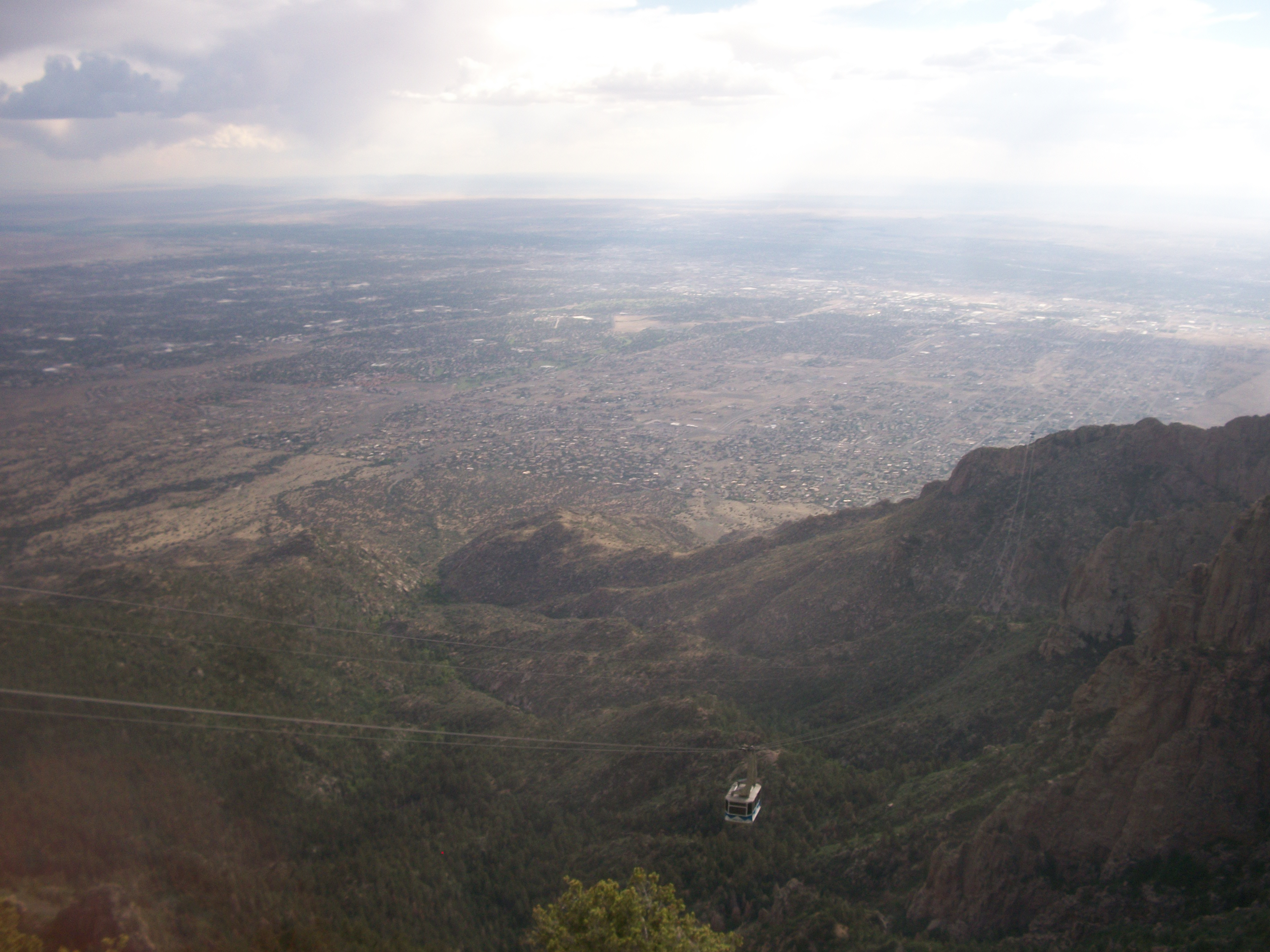
An overview of the tramway and a view of metropolitan Albuquerque from the upper terminal.

The tramway has only two support towers. The first tower, which is 232 feet (70.7 m) tall, is situated at an elevation of 7,010 feet (2,137 m) above sea level and built as an inclined tower with an inclination angle of 18 degrees. The second, just 80 feet (24.4 m) tall, is situated at the end of a major spur of the mountains at an elevation of 8,750 ft (2,667 m) and was built by the aid of over 2,000 helicopter trips, with support rods driven up to 40 feet (12 m) into the granite.

The longest span is between the second tower and the top terminal. This span is the third-longest clear tramway span in the world, at a length of 7,720 feet (2,353 m). Mid-span, the cables are 900 ft (274 m) above the mountainside. This span passes over Domingo Baca Canyon, part of which is referred to as TWA Canyon. This is the site of the crash of TWA Flight 260 on February 19, 1955, in which the lives of all 16 passengers and crew were lost. While much of the wreckage was removed during construction of the tramway, some still remains on the canyon floor and may be visible to riders of the tram.

== Activities on top ==
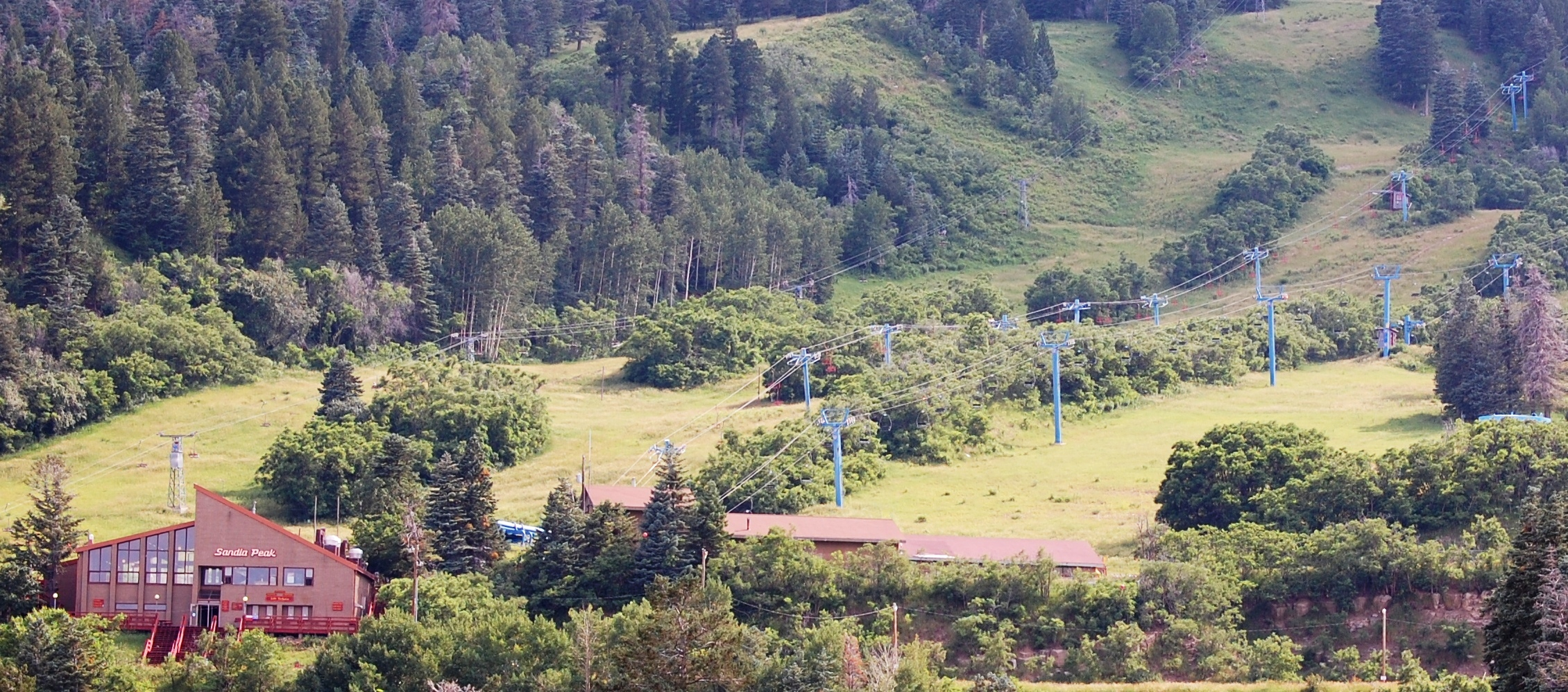
Sandia Peak Ski Area

At the top of Sandia Peak there are many year-round recreational options. The restaurant, TEN 3 (stylized as 10|3), is directly adjacent to the top tram terminal and offers scenic views to the west. Many Forest Service trails offer recreational hiking, backpacking and nature hikes to visitors. Additionally, the tram terminal is located at the top of Sandia Peak Ski Area, which is on the opposite side of the mountain from the tramway and the city. Skiing is available in the wintertime, and during the summer more than 26 miles (42 km) of mountain biking trails are available. Bikes cannot be taken onto tram cars. There is no public transportation in this area of Albuquerque; the tram is accessible only by car, bicycle, or foot.
