= Sandia–Manzano Mountains =

Mountain ranges in New Mexico

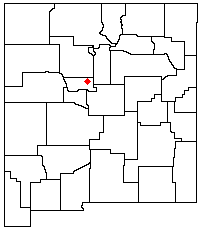
- Location of the Sandia Mountains within New Mexico

Highest point
- Peak: Sandia Crest
- Elevation: 10,678 ft (3,255 m)
- Prominence: 4,201 ft (1,280 m) (crest)
- Coordinates: 35°12′32″N 106°26′49″W

Geography
- Country: United States
- State: New Mexico
- Parent range: Fault block of the Albuquerque Basin
- Borders on: Albuquerque, NM

The Sandia–Manzano Mountains are a substantial mountain area that defines the eastern edge of the middle Rio Grande Valley of central New Mexico. Their elevation changes provide recreational opportunities including winter skiing and summer hiking or picnicing, as compared to the desert grasslands, foothills, and Rio Grande Valley below. The entire mountain chain comprises three parts, arranged north to south: the Sandia Mountains, the Manzanita Mountains, and the Manzano Mountains. The Manzanita Mountains are a series of low-lying foothills that separate the Sandias from the Manzanos.

The Sandia–Manzano Mountains are often considered to be the easternmost major range in the Basin and Range Province. A substantial distance gap of much lower elevation grasslands and savanna exists between the Sangre de Cristo Mountains and the Sandia Mountains, and climate conditions shift between both ranges.

This distinction is further made by plant, animal, and insect species that are common in both the Sandia–Manzano Mountains and in other mountainous areas to the south, but diminish quickly in the mountains to the north. These include Quercus turbinella, Opuntia engelmannii, Aloysia wrightii, and the western diamondback rattlesnake. However, at higher elevations in the Sandia–Manzano Mountains, a strong climatically driven Rocky Mountain biotic element exists.

== See also ==
- Sandia Mountains
- Manzano Mountains
