= Mogollon Baldy =

Mountain in New Mexico, United States

- Location within New Mexico

Highest point
- Elevation: 10,774 ft (3,284 m) NAVD 88
- Prominence: 1,130 ft (340 m)
- Coordinates: 33°16′17″N 108°35′40″W

Geography
- Location: Catron County, New Mexico, U.S.
- Parent range: Mogollon Mountains
- Topo map: USGS Mogollon Baldy Peak

Mogollon Baldy is one of the tallest mountains in the Mogollon Mountains of New Mexico in the United States. It is about 10,774 feet (3,284 m) tall. It is in the Gila National Forest and the Gila Wilderness. The summit marks the boundary between the Wilderness Ranger District and the Glenwood Ranger District.

This area was severely impacted by the Whitewater-Baldy Complex Fire of 2012 which was the largest wildfire in New Mexico state history.
