= Sandia granite =

Plutonic rock found in New Mexico, US

- Stratigraphic range: Calymmian
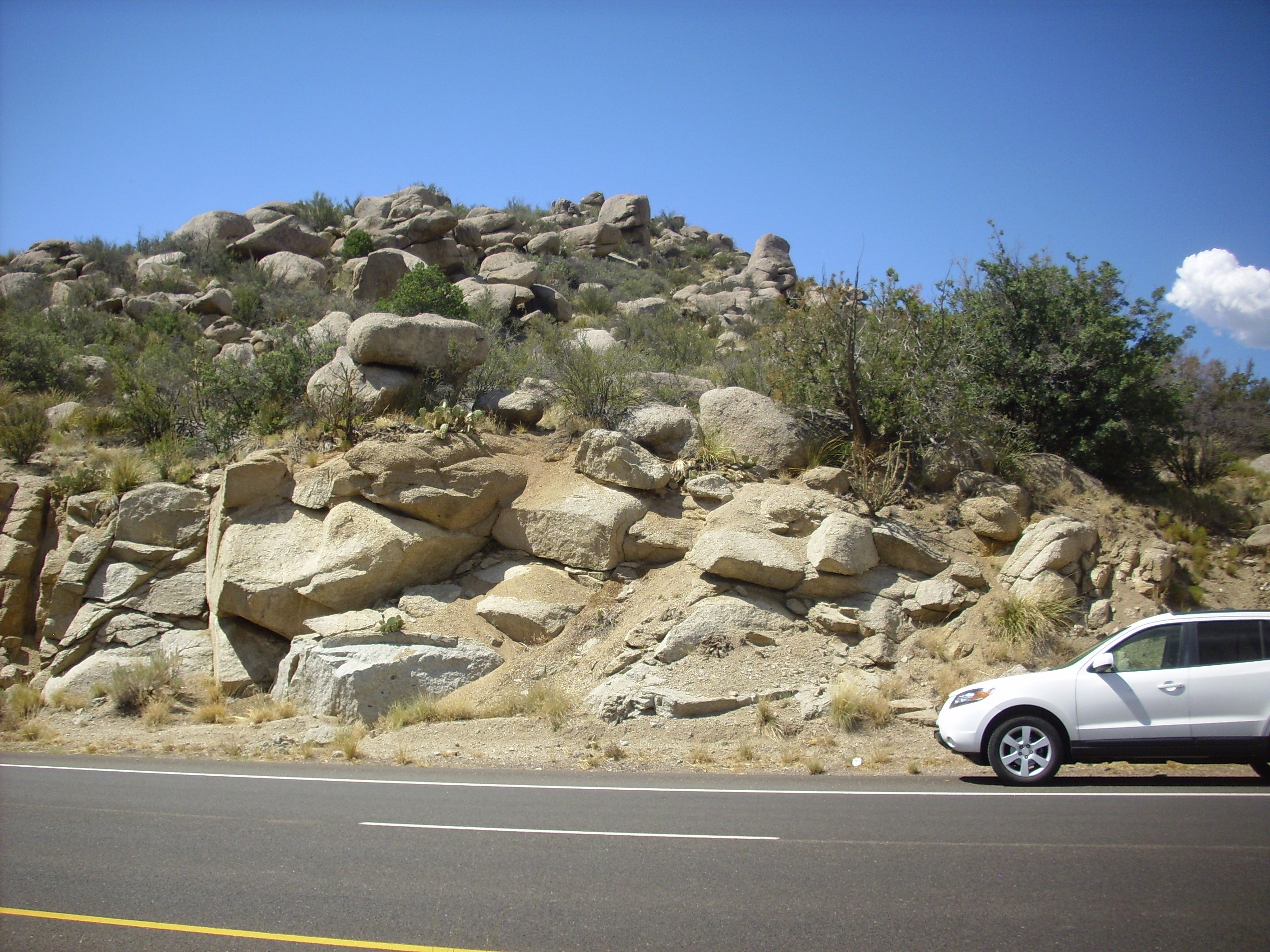
- Outcrops of Sandia granite, Tijeras Canyon, New Mexico, USA
- Type: Pluton

Lithology
- Primary: Monzogranite
- Other: Granodiorite

Location
- Coordinates: 35.117°N 106.439°W
- Region: New Mexico
- Country: United States

Type section
- Named for: Sandia Mountains
- Named by: Kelley and Northrop
- Year defined: 1975
- Sandia granite (the United States) Sandia granite (New Mexico)

The Sandia granite is a pluton in central New Mexico. It has a radiometric age of 1453±12 Ma, corresponding to the Calymmian period.

== Description ==
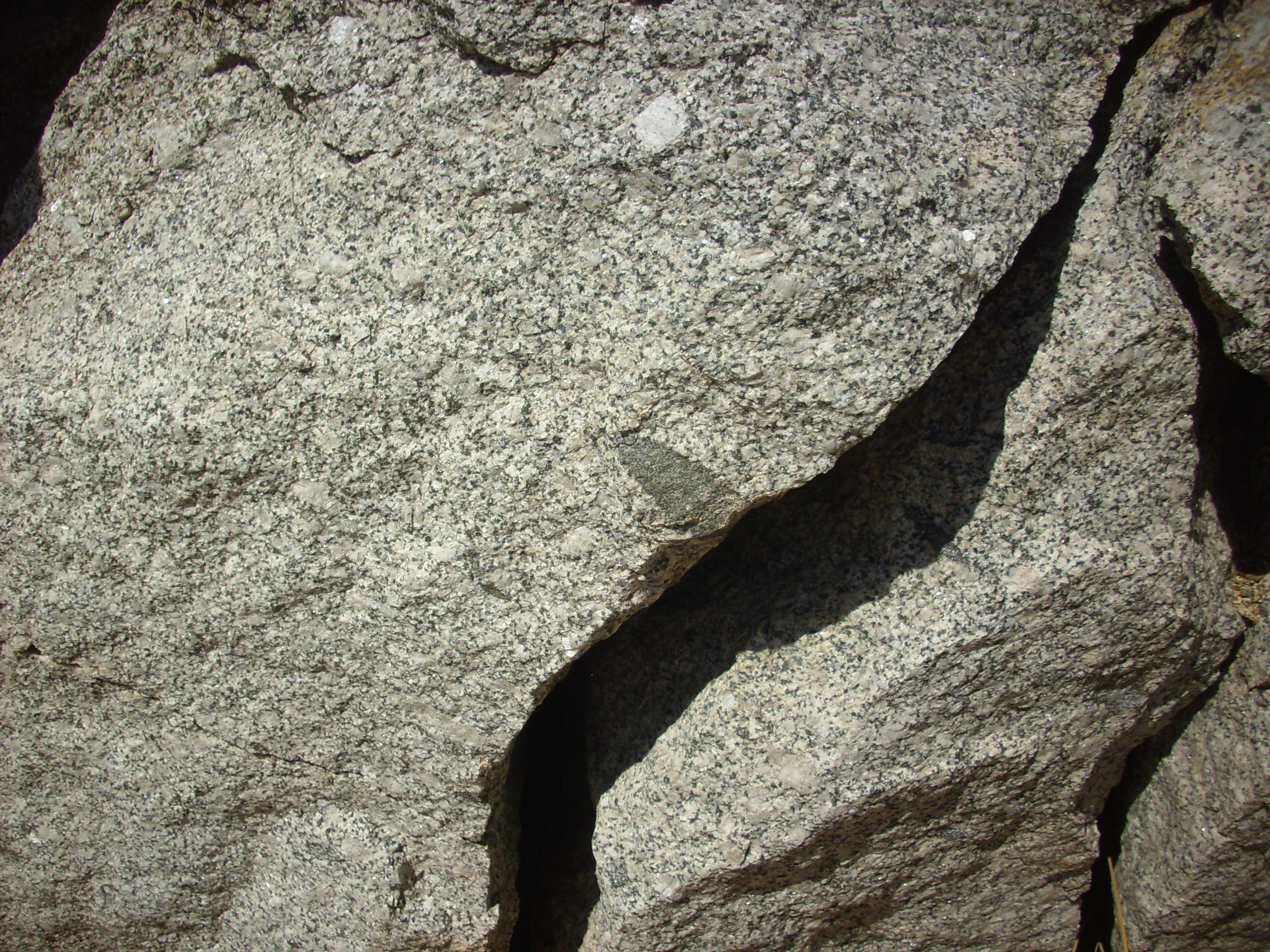
Sandia Granite with xenolith

The Sandia granite is prominently exposed along the east flank of the Rio Grande rift, with almost 1.5 kilometres (4,900 feet) of exposure at Sandia Crest. It extends from Placitas to Tijeras Canyon. Its radiometric age is 1453±12 Ma.

The pluton is a single body with significant heterogeneities. The primary phase is monzogranite with a secondary phase of granodiorite. It is notable for the presence of local outcrops of orbicular granite. Both major phases contain diorite inclusions that are interpreted as co-mingled melts. Exposures are typically gray to pink, medium-to-coarse grained, monzogranite. Aplite and pegmatite dikes crosscut by quartz veins are common. The average modal composition is 28% quartz, 25% potassium feldspar, 38% plagioclase, 8% biotite, and 1% accessory minerals, including magnetite, titanite, zircon, hornblende, apatite, and muscovite.

There are three generations of deformation preserved in the contact aureole that indicate regional deformation. Microstructure and foliation in the aureole indicate east-west compression and north-south extension during and shortly after pluton emplacement, but the pluton interior is undeformed. Pluton emplacement involving heating to ~650°C at pressures of 2-3 kbars, corresponding to a depth of 7-10 km.

The pluton is interpreted as having been emplaced syntectonically at middle crustal depth during the Picuris orogeny. Though there is no local extrusive equivalent, the western Granite-Rhyolite provinces east of the Rocky Mountains may be an extrusive equivalent.

== History of investigation ==
The unit was first defined by Kelley and Northrop in 1975. The name has continued in common use in spite of being preempted by the Sandia Formation.
