= Joe Sando =

American Jemez Pueblo historian of Pueblos (1923–2011)

- Paa Péh
- Born: 1923; Jemez Pueblo, New Mexico
- Died: September 13, 2011 (aged 87–88); Albuquerque, New Mexico
- Citizenship: Jemez Pueblo (by birth), United States (by birth)
- Occupations: Historian, professor, and writer
- Years active: 1960s-2011
- Known for: First Pueblo written historian of the Pueblo peoples
- Board member of: Indian Pueblo Cultural Center
- Spouse: Louisa Barry Sando

Academic background
- Education: Eastern New Mexico University; Vanderbilt University

Academic work
- Era: 1938-2010
- Discipline: Spanish, English, French, Italian, Portuguese, and German Linguist; Folklorist of the American Southwest
- Sub-discipline: New Mexican Spanish
- Institutions: University of New Mexico (in Albuquerque), Institute of American Indian Arts (in Santa Fe)
- Main interests: Pueblo peoples' history, culture, and government
- Notable works: Pueblo Nations: Eight Centuries of Pueblo Indian History, Pueblo Profiles: Cultural Identity through Centuries of Change
- Notable ideas: Pueblo culture, government, and history, should be written instead of solely being oral history, except for the Pueblo religion

Joe Simon Sando (Towa: Paa Péh; 1923 – September 13, 2011) was an American Jemez Pueblo historian, professor, and writer whose work focused on the history and culture of Jemez Pueblo and the Pueblo peoples in the Southwestern United States. He is known as the first Pueblo historian to write about the Pueblo peoples in Western academia.

Sando was born in Jemez Pueblo as a member of the Sun Clan. At this time, there were no written accounts of the Pueblo peoples by a Pueblo author despite a long tradition of Pueblo oral history since time immemorial. The lack of such accounts inspired him to become the first and leading Pueblo historian of the Pueblo peoples. After Sando served in World War II, the G.I. Bill funded his pursuit of studying the Native American history of New Mexico.

After returning from his studies Vanderbilt University to New Mexico in the 1960s, Sando began a prolific lifelong scholarly career focused on the history of the Pueblo peoples. Sando taught at the University of New Mexico and the Institute of American Indian Arts. He was also historical director for the Indian Pueblo Cultural Center, and served on a number of Native American boards, councils, and commissions dedicated to Pueblo and Native issues.

Sando is widely known in New Mexico and among the Pueblo peoples for his scholarship and historical knowledge, with his most famous works are Pueblo Nations: Eight Centuries of Pueblo Indian History, and Pueblo Profiles: Cultural Identity through Centuries of Change. Sando remains the only historian of the 20th century whose work centered on the Pueblo peoples during that time. He is widely seen as the most famous Pueblo academics of the twentieth century along with the Tewa cultural anthropologist Alfonso Ortiz.

== History ==
=== Early life and education ===
Joe Sando was born in 1923 at Jemez Pueblo. He grew up speaking Towa, also known as the Jemez language, as well as New Mexican Spanish. Sando was initially educated in the San Diego Mission School at Jemez Pueblo. He later attended the Santa Fe Indian School, where he learned English.

Sando joined the United States Navy during World War II. The G.I. Bill funded his studies of Native American history, particularly the Native American history of New Mexico. After the war he attended Eastern New Mexico University and Vanderbilt University.

=== Professor ===
Sando returned to New Mexico in the 1960s, beginning a lifelong career. He was consistently working as a historian of Pueblo culture, government, and history, and taught Pueblo history at the University of New Mexico in Albuquerque and the Institute of American Indian Arts in Santa Fe.

=== Books ===
Sando wrote several lauded notable non-fiction books about the Pueblo peoples, such as Pueblo Profiles: Cultural Identities Through Centuries of Change, Po'pay: Leader of the First American Revolution, Nee Hemish, a History of Jémez Pueblo, the forward to Pueblo People: Ancient Traditions, Modern Lives, The Pueblo Indians; the autobiography Pueblo Recollections: The Life of Paa Péh, and Pueblo Nations: Eight Centuries of Pueblo Indian History. His books about Pueblo culture, government, and history included how Pueblos interacted with the Spanish Empire, Mexico, and the United States, and his 2008 memoir is one of the few written by a Native American author.

Sando was inspired to write Pueblo Nations: Eight Centuries of Pueblo Indian History to counter a prevailing sentiment narrative in the academia of his youth that "was uncomplimentary to young Indians." Sando believed it was imperative there were written "Indian stories to be written by Indians for Indian school children." The American Historical Review reviewed Pueblo Nations as “An important and rare book. Clearly written and fairly presented, a first-hand synthesis of American Indian history and culture.” The New York Times called Pueblo Nations “The first insider’s story of the 800-year history of the 19 pueblos in New Mexico—an excellent book.” The Associated Press wrote that "scholars and historians considered him the first scholar from any of the New Mexico Pueblos to tackle that life from an insider's point of view."

While Sando was very open about spreading knowledge concerning the secular history of the Pueblo peoples, he remained reluctant to publicly address aspects of the Pueblo religion due to the Pueblo taboo of breaking the code of silence when talking about the religion to non-Pueblos. Unlike Sando, the Tewa scholar Alfonso Ortiz of Ohkay Owingeh would break this taboo.

=== Indian Pueblo Cultural Center ===
Sando was also the director of the Institute of Pueblo Study and Research, the historical archives at the Indian Pueblo Cultural Center. In 1992, he was part of a select group of scholars invited to speak in Spain to mark 500 years after the Columbian Exchange. In addition to his scholarly work, Sando was also "an active member and founder of a number of boards, councils and commissions on Native American issues. According to Lela Kaskalla, president of the board of directors at the Indian Pueblo Cultural Center, “Mr. Sando knew people from every one of the pueblos. He would ask who you were, who your parents were, who your grandparents were and inevitably he could tie back to someone he knew from the pueblo ... An individual like Mr. Sando is so rare. You meet a handful of them in your lifetime. He was the life in the Institute for Pueblo Indian Studies. He believed in it; he wanted us to tell our own story.” A member of Cochiti Pueblo said Sando's "knowledge that he drew from his love of reading and writing our history, provided the message that we – meaning all of us from all walks of life – can understand and enjoy how in the end we’re all part of the same family... He was one of the greatest ambassadors of our people to the world.”

== Death and legacy ==
Sando died aged 88 in 2011.

Sando's work remains unique in its value in chronicling Pueblo history during the 20th century, with a scholar writing that Pueblo Profiles and Pueblo Nations are the only works that put "Indians at the center" of the century.

== Personal life ==
Sando was married to Louisa Barry Sando for 61 years. They had a daughter, a son, three granddaughters, and two great-grandsons at the time of his death.

== Published works ==
- Sando, Joe S. The Pueblo Indians, San Francisco, Calif.: The Indian Historian Press, 1976.
- Sando, Joe S. Pueblo Nations: Eight Centuries of Pueblo Indian History, Clear Light Publishers, Santa Fe, New Mexico, 1992
- Sando, Joe S. Pueblo Profiles: Cultural Identity through Centuries of Change. Clear Light Publishers, 1998.
- Sando, Joe S. and Herman Agoyo, editors, Po'pay: Leader of the First American Revolution, Clear Light Publishing, Santa Fe, New Mexico, 2005
- Sando, Joe S. Nee Hemish, a History of Jémez Pueblo, Santa Fe, N.Mex.: Clear Light Publishing, 2008.
- Sando, Joe S. Pueblo Recollections: The Life of Paa Péh, Santa Fe, N.Mex.: Clear Light Publishing, 2008.
