= Pueblo peoples =

Native Americans in the Southwestern US

Pueblo people
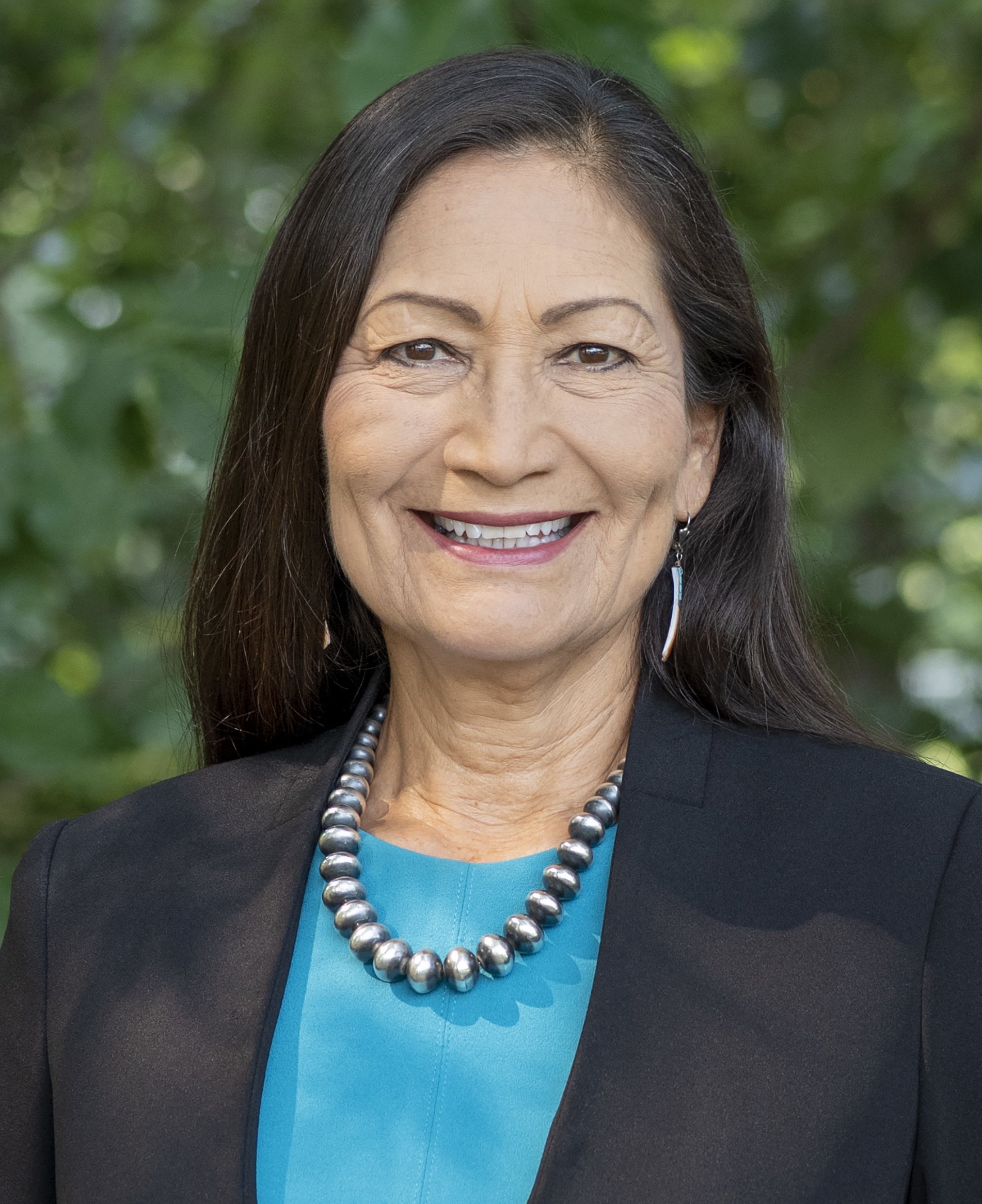
- Deb Haaland, who was the first Native American Secretary of the Interior, and is now the first female Native American governor-elect of the state of New Mexico, is a citizen of Laguna Pueblo and has relatives at Jemez Pueblo.

Total population
- c. 75,000

Regions with significant populations
- New Mexico, Arizona, and Texas, Southwestern United States
- New Mexico: 52,369

Languages
- English, Spanish, Hopi, Tanoan languages, Keresan, Keresan Pueblo Sign Language, Zuni

Religion
- Pueblo religion, Roman Catholicism, minority Protestantism

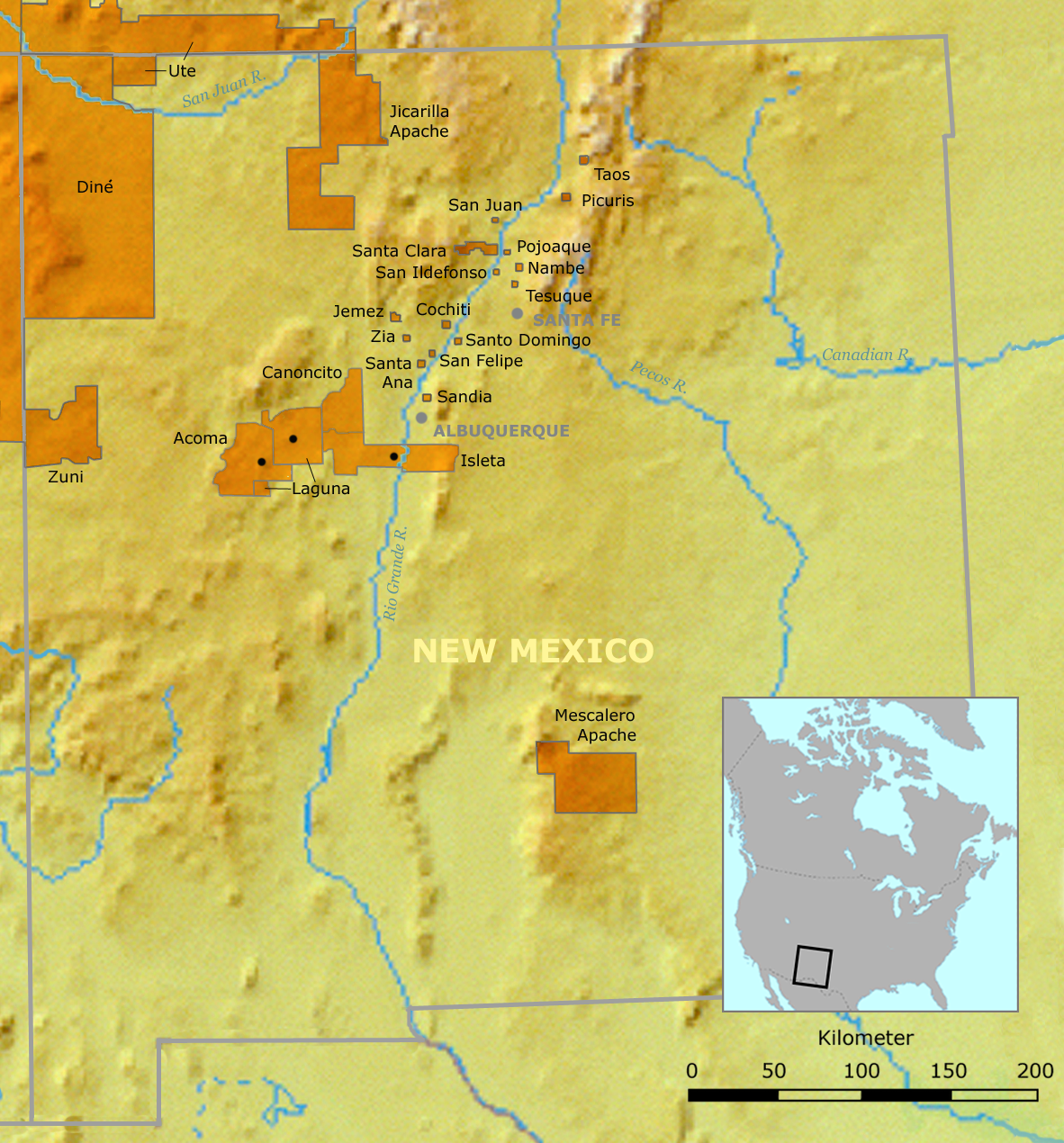
A map of Pueblos in New Mexico, among other Indigenous lands. Not pictured are the Hopi Reservation in Arizona and the Ysleta del Sur Pueblo in Texas.

Map of the Hopi Reservation in Arizona, marked in red

The Pueblo peoples, sometimes referred to as Puebloans, are Native Americans in the Southwestern United States who share common agricultural, material, and religious practices. Among the currently inhabited pueblos, Taos, San Ildefonso, Acoma, Zuni, and Hopi are some of the most commonly known. Pueblo people speak languages from four different language families, and each pueblo is further divided culturally by kinship systems and agricultural practices, although all cultivate varieties of corn (maize).

Pueblo peoples have lived in the American Southwest for millennia and descend from the Ancestral Pueblo peoples. The term Anasazi is sometimes used to refer to Ancestral Puebloan. "Anasazi" is a Navajo adoption of a Ute term that translates to Ancient Enemy or Primitive Enemy, but was used by them to mean something like "barbarian" or "savage", hence the modern Pueblo peoples' rejection of it (see exonym).

Pueblo is a Spanish term for "village". When Spanish conquest of the Americas began in the 16th century with the founding of Nuevo México, they came across complex, multistory villages built of adobe, stone and other local materials. New Mexico contains the largest number of federally recognized Pueblo communities, though some Pueblo communities also live in Arizona and Texas and along the Rio Grande and Colorado rivers and their tributaries.

Pueblo nations have maintained much of their traditional cultures, which center around agricultural practices, a tight-knit community revolving around family clans, and respect for tradition. Pueblo people have been remarkably adept at preserving their culture and core religious beliefs, including developing syncretic Pueblo Christianity. Exact numbers of Pueblo peoples are unknown but, in the 21st century, some 75,000 Pueblo people live predominantly in New Mexico and Arizona, but also in Texas and elsewhere.

== Etymology ==
Pueblo, which means "village" and "people" in Spanish, was a term originating with the Spanish explorers who used it to refer to the people's particular style of dwelling. The term Puebloan was previously common in an archeological context during the twentieth century. In the twentieth century, Pueblo peoples and their archaeological culture were often referred to by the term Anasazi exonym, a term introduced by Alfred V. Kidder from the Navajo word anaasází meaning 'enemy ancestors' (anaa– 'enemy', -sází 'their ancestors') although Kidder thought it meant 'old people'. Contemporary Pueblo object to the use of this term, viewing it as derogatory.

== Subdivisions ==
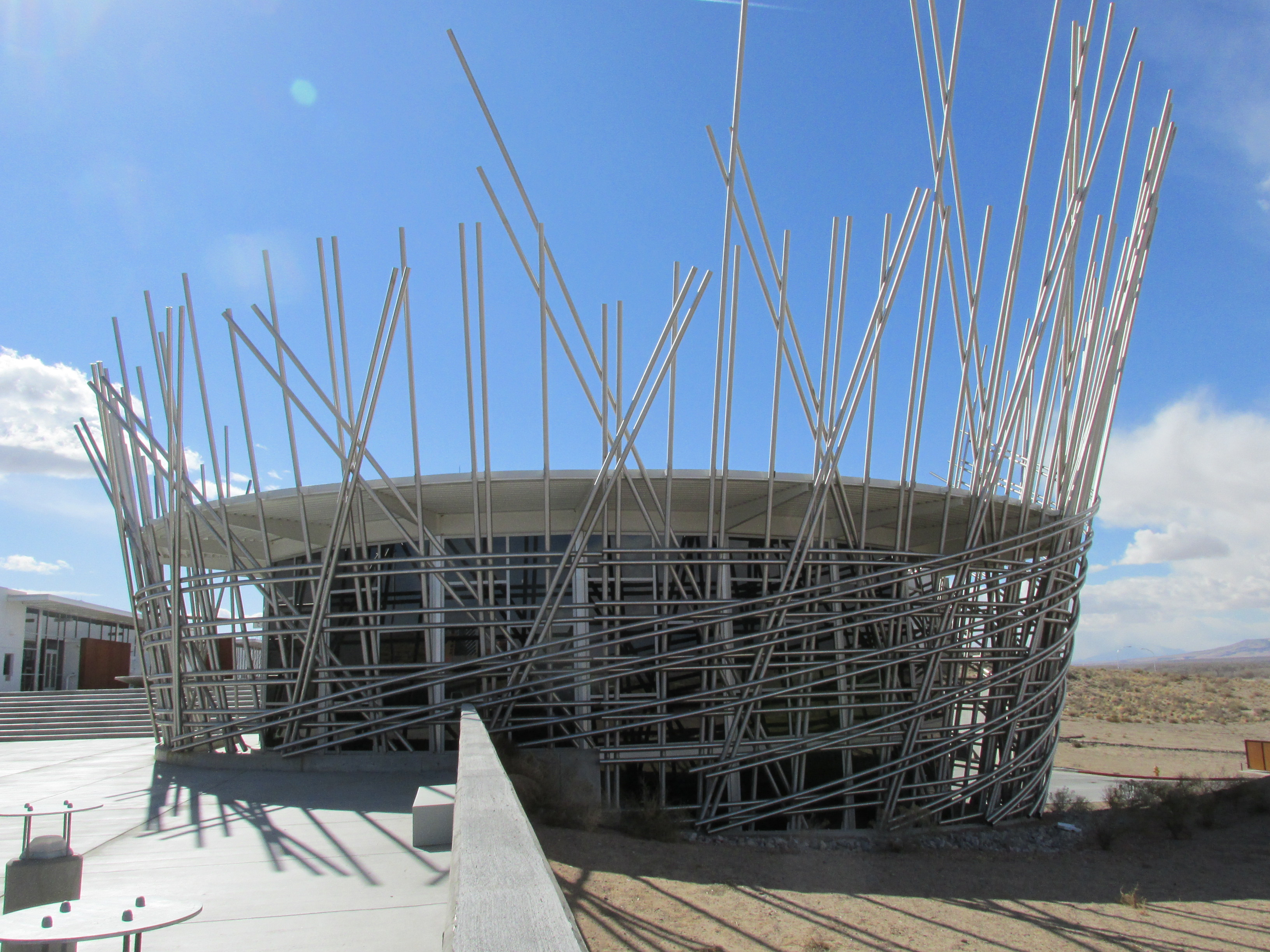
Tribal Council Building, Isleta Pueblo NM

Despite various similarities in cultural and religious practices, scholars have proposed divisions of contemporary Pueblos into smaller groups based on linguistic and individual manifestations of the broader Pueblo culture.

=== Linguistic affiliation ===
Pueblo peoples today speak languages from four distinct language families, which means these languages are completely different in vocabulary, grammar, and most other linguistic aspects. As a result, each Pueblo language is not easily understood by speakers of the other languages, with English now working as the lingua franca of the region.

- Keresan: family (Note: Considered by some to be a language isolate consisting of a dialect continuum) to which Western and Eastern Keres belong, spoken at the Keres pueblos of Acoma, Laguna, Santa Ana, Zia, Cochiti, Kewa, and San Felipe.
- Tanoan: consisting of three separate sub-branches:
  - Tewa: the most widespread Tanoan language with several dialects, spoken by the Tewa at Ohkay Owingeh, San Ildefonso, Santa Clara, Tesuque, Nambé, and Pojoaque Pueblos, as well as Hano on the Hopi Reservation.
  - Towa: currently solely spoken at Jemez Pueblo.
  - Tiwa: the only Tanoan sub-branch consisting of separate languages, spoken by the Tiwa people:
    - Northern Tiwa: a language with two dialects, one spoken at Taos Pueblo and the other at Picuris.
    - Southern Tiwa: also consisting of two dialects, spoken at Sandia and Isleta Pueblos as well as Ysleta del Sur in Texas.
- Uto-Aztecan: Hopi, spoken exclusively on the Hopi Reservation.
- Zuni: a language isolate, spoken exclusively at Zuni Pueblo.

=== Cultural practices ===
Anthropologists have studied Pueblo peoples extensively and published various classifications of their subdivisions. In 1950, Fred Russell Eggan contrasted the peoples of the Eastern and Western Pueblos, based largely on their subsistence farming techniques. The Western or Desert Pueblos of the Zuni and Hopi specialize in dry farming, compared to the irrigation farmers of the Eastern or River Pueblos.

In 1954, Paul Kirchhoff published a division of Pueblo peoples into two groups based on culture. The Hopi, Zuni, Keres and Jemez each have matrilineal kinship systems: children were considered born into their mother's klan and must marry a spouse outside it, an exogamous practice. They maintain multiple kivas for sacred ceremonies. Their creation story tells that humans emerged from the underground. They emphasize four or six cardinal directions as part of their sacred cosmology, beginning in the north. Four and seven are numbers considered significant in their rituals and symbolism. In contrast, the Tanoan-speaking Pueblos (other than Jemez) have a patrilineal kinship system, with children considered born into their father's clan. They practice endogamy, or marriage within the clan. They have two kivas or two groups of kivas in their pueblos. Their belief system is based in dualism. Their creation story recounts the emergence of people from underwater. They use five directions, beginning in the west. Their ritual numbers are based on multiples of three.

== History of the Pueblo peoples ==
=== Origins ===
Pueblo societies contain elements of three major cultures that dominated the Southwest United States region before European contact: the Mogollon culture, whose adherents occupied an area near Gila Wilderness; the Hohokam culture; and the Ancestral Puebloan culture who occupied the Chaco Canyon and Mesa Verde regions of the Four Corners area.

Archeological evidence suggests that people partaking in the Mogollon culture were initially foragers who augmented their subsistence through the development of farming. Around the first millennium CE farming became the main means to obtain food. Water control features are common among Mimbres branch sites which date from the 10th through 12th centuries CE. The nature and density of Mogollon residential villages changed through time; the earliest Mogollon villages were small hamlets composed of several pithouses, houses excavated into the ground surface with a stick and thatch roofs supported by a network of posts and beams, and faced on the exterior with earth. Village sizes increased over time so that by the 11th century CE villages composed of ground level dwellings of rock and earth walls and wooden beam-supported roofs were the norm. Cliff-dwellings became common during the 13th and 14th centuries.

Hohokam is a term borrowed from the O'odham language, used to define an archaeological culture that relied on irrigation canals to water their crops since as early as the 9th century CE. Their irrigation system techniques allowed for its adherents to expand into the largest population in the Southwest by 1300. Archaeologists working at a major archaeological dig in the 1990s in the Tucson Basin, along the Santa Cruz River, identified a culture and people that were ancestors of the Hohokam who might have occupied southern Arizona as early as 2000 BCE. This prehistoric group from the Early Agricultural Period grew corn, lived year-round in sedentary villages, and developed sophisticated irrigation canals from the beginning of the common era to about the middle of the 15th century. Within a larger context, the Hohokam culture area inhabited a central trade position between the Patayan situated along with the Lower Colorado River and in southern California; the Trincheras of Sonora, Mexico; the Mogollon culture in eastern Arizona, southwest New Mexico, and northwest Chihuahua, Mexico; and the Ancestral Puebloans in northern Arizona, northern New Mexico, southwest Colorado, and southern Utah.

The Ancestral Puebloan culture is known for the stone and earth dwellings its people built along cliff walls, particularly during the Pueblo II and Pueblo III eras, from about 900 to 1350 CE in total. The best-preserved examples of the stone dwellings are now protected within United States' national parks, such as Navajo National Monument, Chaco Culture National Historical Park, Mesa Verde National Park, Canyons of the Ancients National Monument, Aztec Ruins National Monument, Bandelier National Monument, Hovenweep National Monument, and Canyon de Chelly National Monument. These villages were accessible only by rope or through rock climbing. However, the first Ancestral Puebloan homes and villages were based on the pit-house, a common feature in the Basketmaker periods. Villages consisted of apartment-like complexes and structures made from stone, adobe mud, and other local materials, or were carved into the sides of canyon walls. Design details from Ancestral Puebloan villages contain elements from cultures as far away as present-day Mexico. In their day, these ancient towns and cities were usually multistoried and multi-purposed buildings surrounding open plazas and viewsheds. They were occupied by hundreds to thousands of Ancestral Pueblo peoples. These population complexes hosted cultural and civic events and infrastructure that supported a vast outlying region hundreds of miles away linked by transportation roadways.

=== Development of architecture and city-states ===
Ruins of Pueblo Bonito, in Chaco Canyon

By about 700 to 900 CE, Pueblo people began to move away from ancient pit houses dug in cliffs and to construct connected rectangular rooms arranged in apartment-like structures made of adobe and adapted to sites. By 1050, they had developed planned villages composed of large terraced buildings, each with many rooms. These apartment-house villages were often constructed on defensive sites: on ledges of massive rock, on flat summits, or on steep-sided mesas, locations that would afford Pueblo people protection from raiding parties originating from the north, such as the Comanche and Navajo. The largest of these villages, Pueblo Bonito in Chaco Canyon, New Mexico, contained around 700 rooms in five stories; it may have housed as many as 1000 persons.

=== Spanish contact and colonization ===
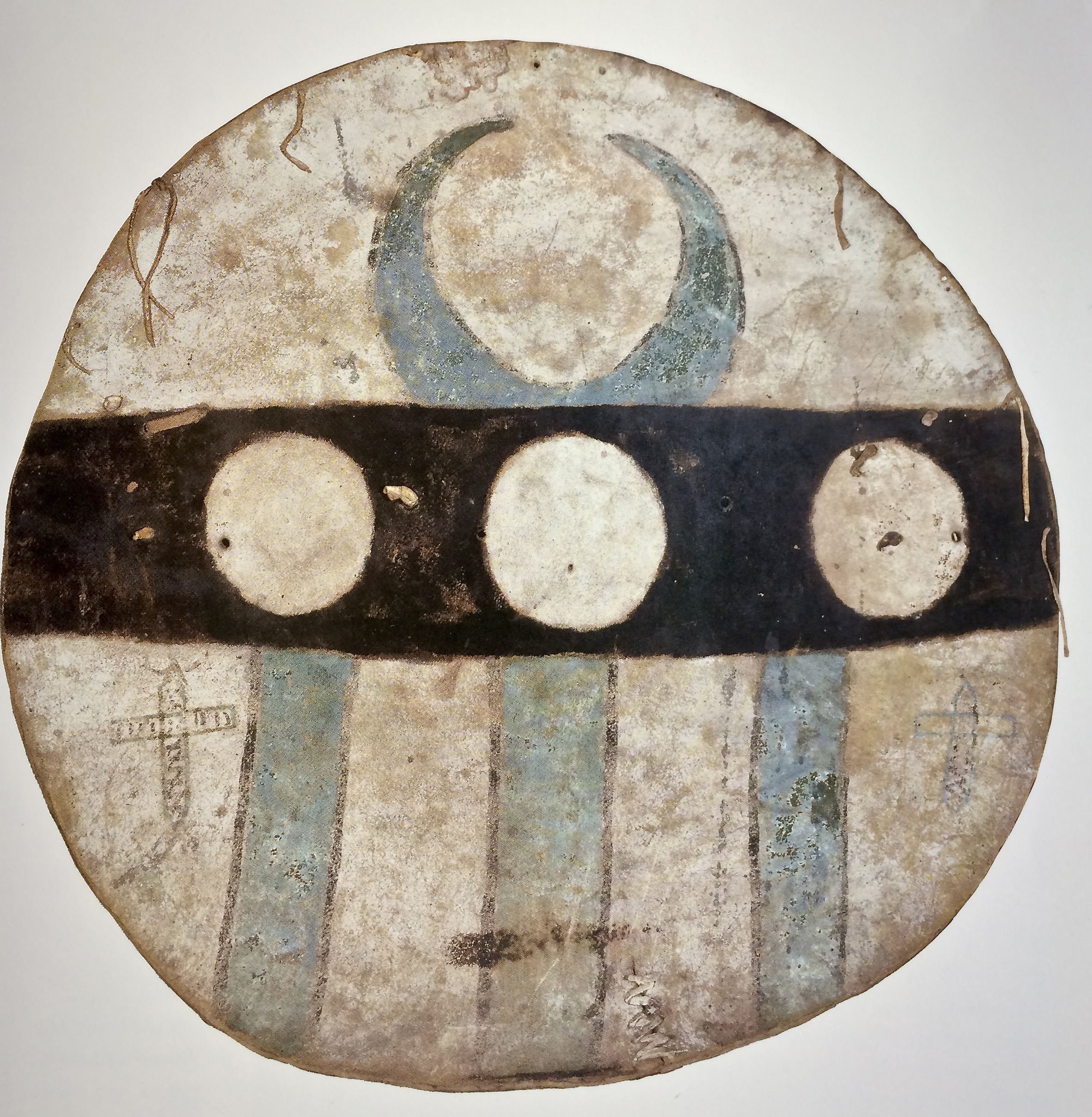
Jemez Pueblo shield, c. 1840

Before 1598, Spanish exploration of the present-day Pueblo areas was limited to several transitory groups. A group of colonizers led by Juan de Oñate arrived at the end of the 16th century as part of an apostolic mission to convert the Natives. Despite initial peaceful contact, Spain's attempts to dispose of the Pueblo religion and replace it with Catholicism became increasingly more aggressive, and were met with great resistance by Pueblo peoples, whose governmental structure was based around the figure of the cacique, a theocratic leader for both material and spiritual matters. Over the years, Spaniards' methods grew harsher, leading to a series of revolts by Pueblo peoples.

=== Pueblo Revolt ===
The Pueblo Revolt that started in 1680 was the first led by a Native American group to successfully expel colonists from North America for a considerable number of years. It followed the successful Tiguex War led by Tiwas against the Coronado Expedition in 1540–41, which temporarily halted Spanish advances in present-day New Mexico. The 17th century's revolt was a direct consequence of growing discontent among the Northern Pueblos against the abuses by the Spaniards, which finally brewed into a large organized uprising against European colonizers.

The events that led to the Pueblo Revolt go back at least a decade before the formal uprising began. In the 1670s, severe drought swept the region, which caused both a famine among the Pueblo and increased the frequency of raids by the Apache. Neither Spanish nor Pueblo soldiers were able to prevent the attacks by the Apache raiding parties.

The unrest among the Pueblos came to a head in 1675, when Governor Juan Francisco Treviño ordered the arrest of forty-seven Pueblo medicine men and accused them of practicing sorcery. Four of the medicine men were sentenced to death by hanging; three of those sentences were carried out, while the fourth prisoner committed suicide. The remaining men were publicly whipped and sentenced to prison. When the news of the killings and public humiliation reached Pueblo leaders, they moved in force to Santa Fe, where the prisoners were held. Because a large number of Spanish soldiers were away fighting the Apache, Governor Treviño was forced to release the prisoners. Among those released was an Ohkay Owingeh Tewa man named Popé. After being released, Popé took up residence in Taos Pueblo far from the capital of Santa Fe and spent the next five years seeking support for a revolt among the 46 Pueblo villages. He was able to gain the support of the Northern Tiwa, Tewa, Towa, Tano, and Keres-speaking Pueblos of the Rio Grande Valley. The Pecos Pueblo, 50 miles east of the Rio Grande pledged its participation in the revolt as did the Zuni and Hopi, 120 and 200 miles respectively west of the Rio Grande. At the time, the Spanish population was of about 2,400 colonists, including mixed-blood mestizos, and Indian servants and retainers, who were scattered thinly throughout the region. Starting early on 10 August 1680, Popé and leaders of each of the Pueblos sent a knotted rope carried by a runner to the next Pueblo; the number of knots signified the number of days to wait before beginning the uprising. Finally, on 21 August, 2,500 Pueblo warriors took the colony's capital Santa Fe from Spanish control, killing many colonizers, the remainder of whom were successfully expelled.

=== Mexican period and Rio Arriba Rebellion ===
The rebellion took place in 1837, when New Mexico was part of the frontier of the Republic of Mexico which was located to the south, along with the Mescalero and Gila Apaches; to the west were the Navajo lands, and to the east was the Republic of Texas. The Department of New Mexico (a department of the U.S. Army) was surrounded by those they considered to be enemies.

=== Self-determination era ===
The U.S. federal government's return of Blue Lake in 1970 marked the first success of the contemporary Land Back movement and the Native Self-Determination Era.

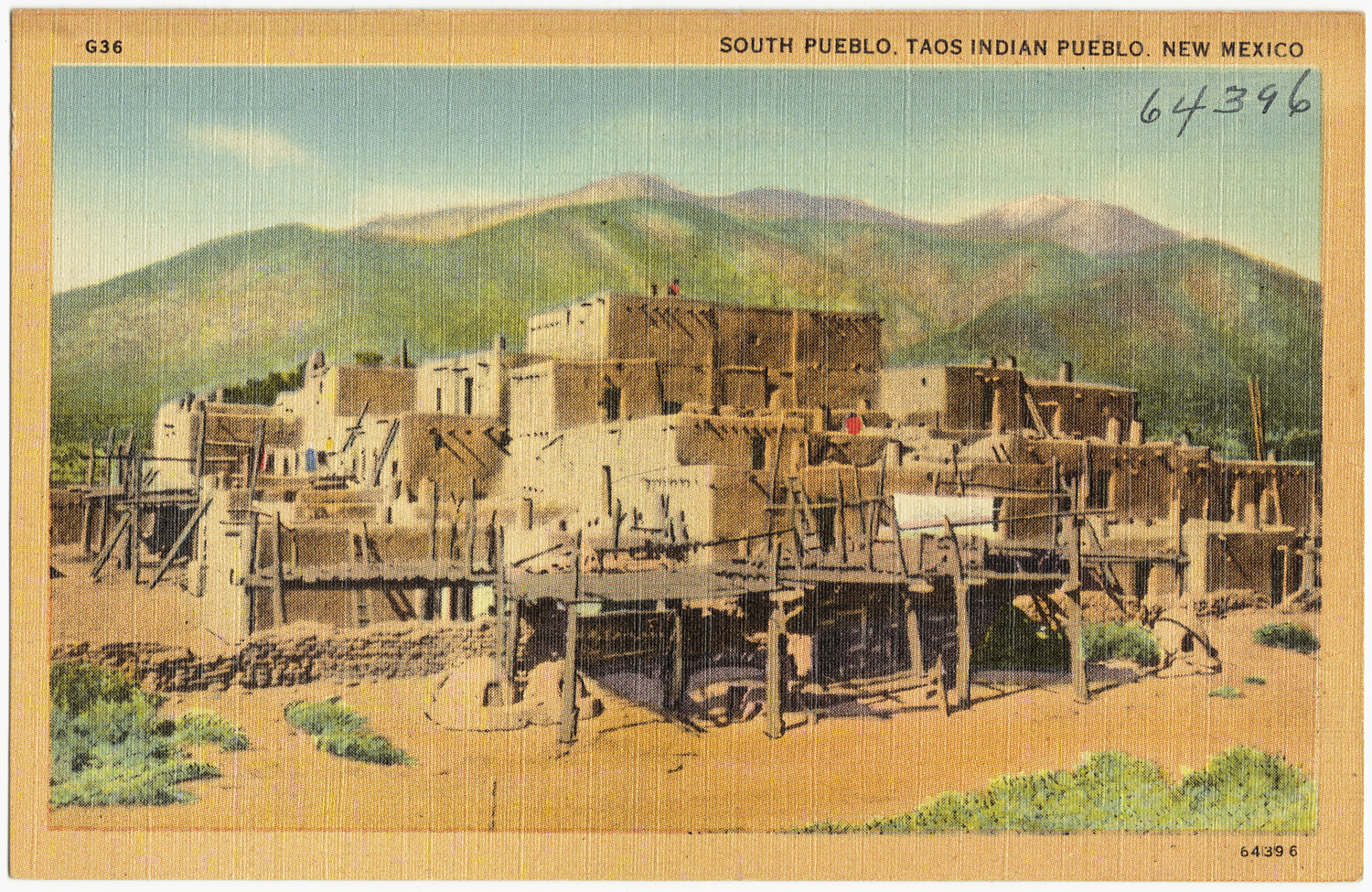
Residential adobe complex, and Taos Mountain pictured on an old postcard, circa 1930-1945.

The Pueblo's 48,000 acres (19,000 ha) of mountain land was taken by President Theodore Roosevelt and designated as the Carson National Forest early in the 20th century. It was finally returned in 1970 by the United States when the Republican Richard Nixon signed Democratic senator Fred Harris' Public Law 91-550. An additional 764 acres (309 ha) south of the ridge between Simpson Peak and Old Mike Peak and west of Blue Lake were transferred back to the Pueblo in 1996.

Blue Lake, which the people of the Pueblo consider sacred, was included in this return of Taos land. The Pueblo notably involved non-native people in lobbying the federal government for the return of Blue Lake, as they argued that their unrestricted access to the lake and the surrounding region was necessary to ensure their religious freedom. The Pueblo's web site names the reacquisition of the sacred Blue Lake as the most important event in its history due to the spiritual belief that the Taos people originated from the lake. It is believed that their ancestors live there, and the Pueblos themselves only ascend the mountain for ceremonial purposes. Blue Lake serves as a vital economic foundation for this farming community, providing the main water supply that supports their agricultural activities, including corn cultivation, fruit growing, bean production, and livestock ranching with cattle and sheep.

The self-determination era marked a change for the Pueblo peoples in academia. Alfonso Ortiz, a Tewa cultural anthropologist and activist. Ortiz's research focused on Tewa cultural practices, rituals, myths, and knowledge. He is best known for his book on Tewa cosmologies, The Tewa World: Space, Time, Being and Becoming in a Pueblo Society, published in 1969. While this sharing of sacred practices with outsiders generated some controversy within his community, Ortiz was an early proponent of autoethnography and encouraged other Native peoples to produce scholarship on their own cultures, instead of being the object of study of outside researchers. In the 1990s, Jemez Pueblo historian Joe Sando became the first Pueblo historian to publish several books about the history of the Pueblo peoples.

=== 21st century ===
On 22 September 2005, the statue of Po'pay, leader of the Pueblo Revolt, was unveiled in the Capitol Rotunda in Washington, D.C. The statue was the second commissioned by the state of New Mexico for the National Statuary Hall Collection; it was the 100th and last to be added to the collection. It was created by Cliff Fragua, Jemez Pueblo sculptor. It is the only statue in the collection to be created by a Native American.

In 2018, Deb Haaland became the first Pueblo woman elected to the United States House of Representatives, and later became the first Native American Secretary of the Interior from 2021-2025.

== Culture ==
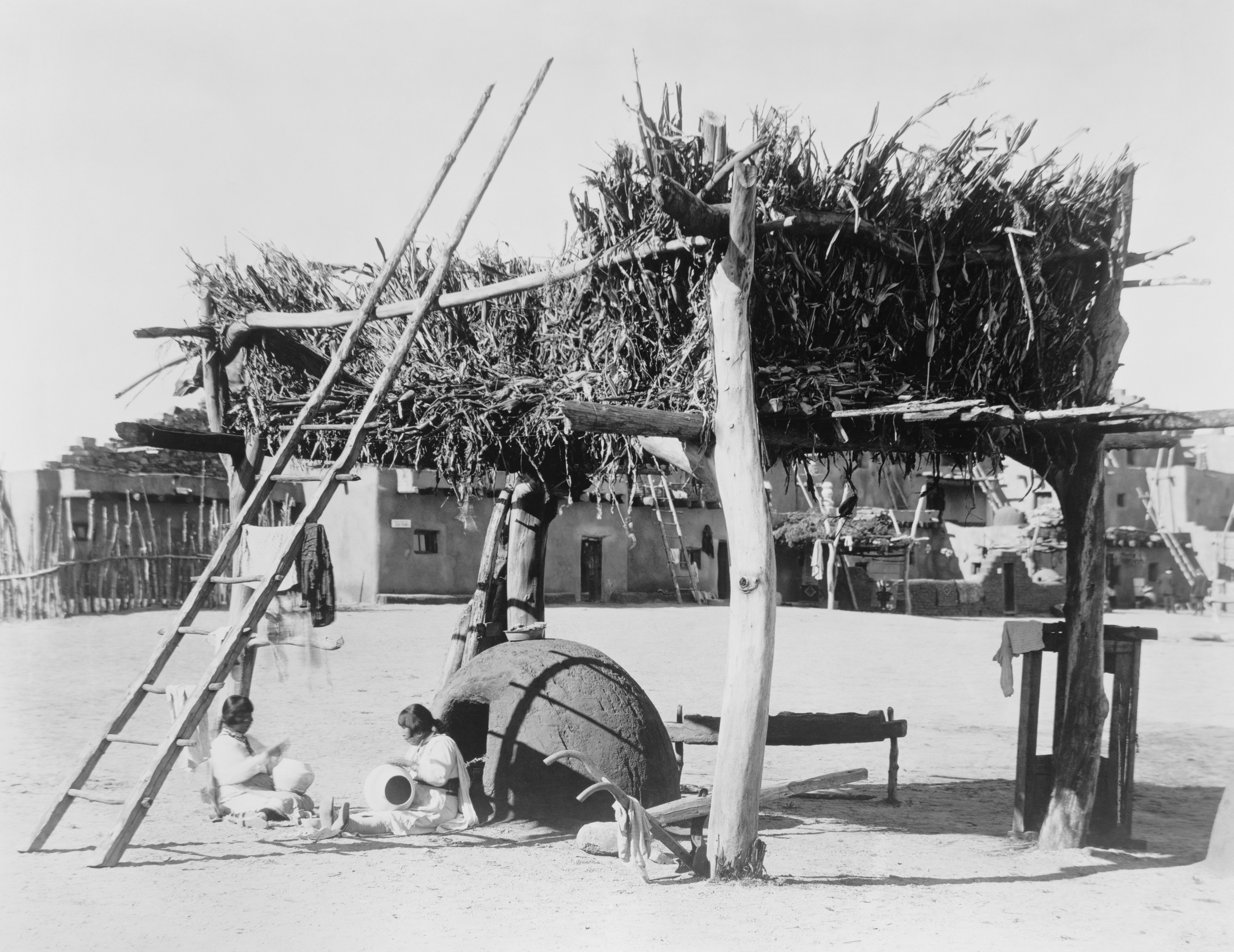
A Zuni drying platform for maize and other foods, with two women crafting pottery beneath it. From the Panama-California Exposition, San Diego, California. January 1915.

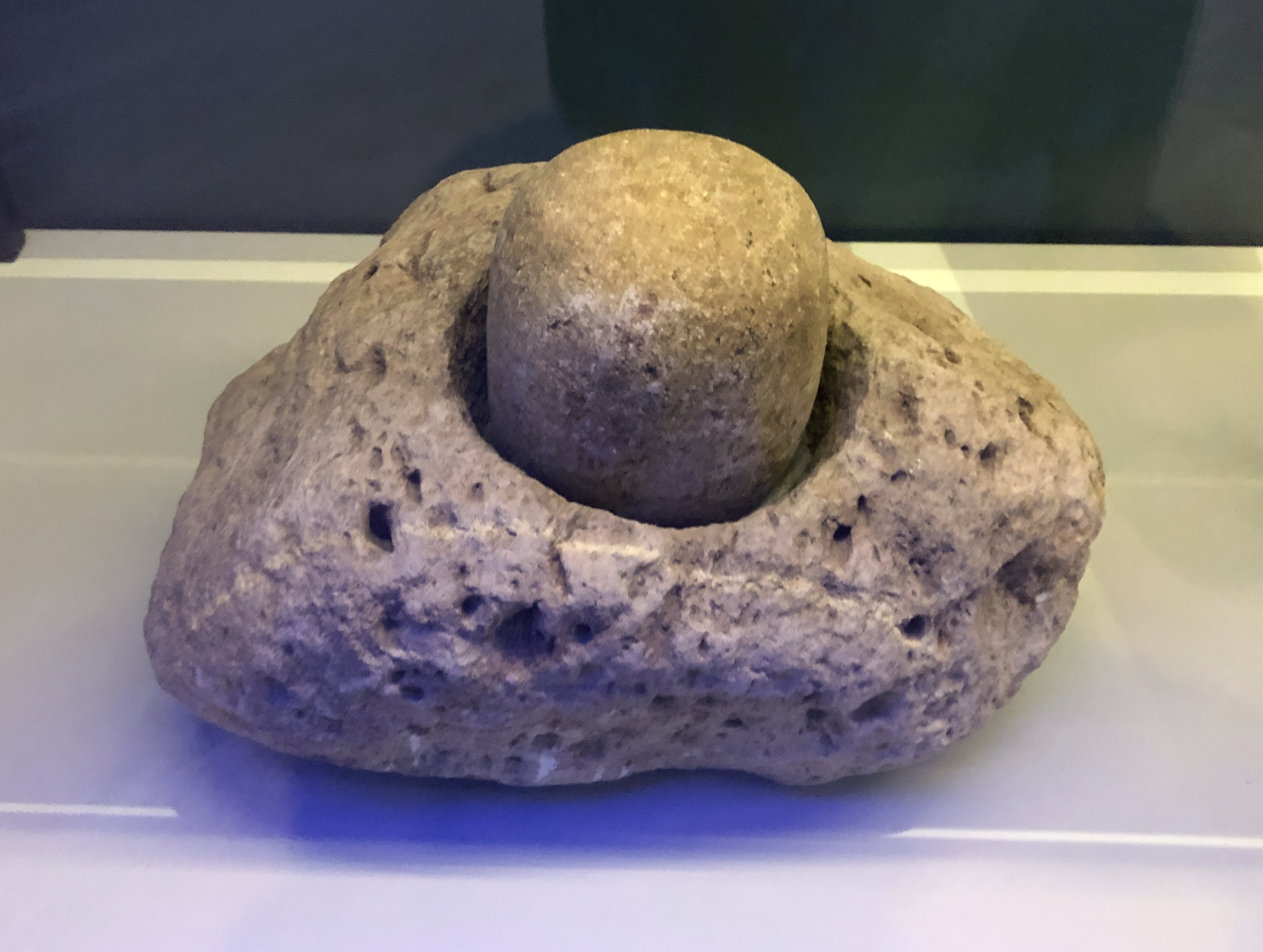
Stone mortar and pestle used for grinding corn and grains, AD 900–1300, Spurgeon Draw site, Catron County, New Mexico

In 1844 Josiah Gregg described the historic Pueblo people in The journal of a Santa Fé trader as follows:

When these regions were first discovered it appears that the inhabitants lived in comfortable houses and cultivated the soil, as they have continued to do up to the present time. Indeed, they are now considered the best horticulturists in the country, furnishing most of the fruits and a large portion of the vegetable supplies that are to be found in the markets. They were until very lately the only people in New Mexico who cultivated the grape. They also maintain at the present time considerable herds of cattle, horses, etc. They are, in short, a remarkably sober and industrious race, conspicuous for morality and honesty, and very little given to quarreling or dissipation ...

=== Material culture ===
Pueblo people have woven cloth and used twined and embroidered textiles, natural fibers, and animal hide in their cloth-making. Since woven clothing is laborious and time-consuming, everyday clothing for working around the villages was sparer. The men often wore breechcloths.

=== Agriculture ===
Corn is a primary staple food for Pueblo peoples. Although it is possible that different groups may have grown local plants such as gourds and chenopods at very early dates, the first evidence of maize cultivation in the Southwest dates from about 2100 BCE. Small, fairly undomesticated maize cobs have been found at five different sites in New Mexico and Arizona.

Maize reached the present-day Southwest via an unknown route from Mesoamerica (i.e., present-day Mexico) and was rapidly adopted by peoples in the region. One theory states that maize cultivation was carried northward from central Mexico by migrating farmers, most likely speakers of a Uto-Aztecan language. Another theory, more accepted among scholars, is that between 4300 BCE and 2100 BCE maize was diffused northward from group to group rather than by migrants. There is evidence that maize was initially cultivated in the Southwest during a climatic period when precipitation was relatively high.

=== Pottery ===
The various Pueblo communities have different traditions regarding the making and decoration of pottery artifacts. Present-day archaeologists date Pueblo pottery back the early centuries of the Common Era.

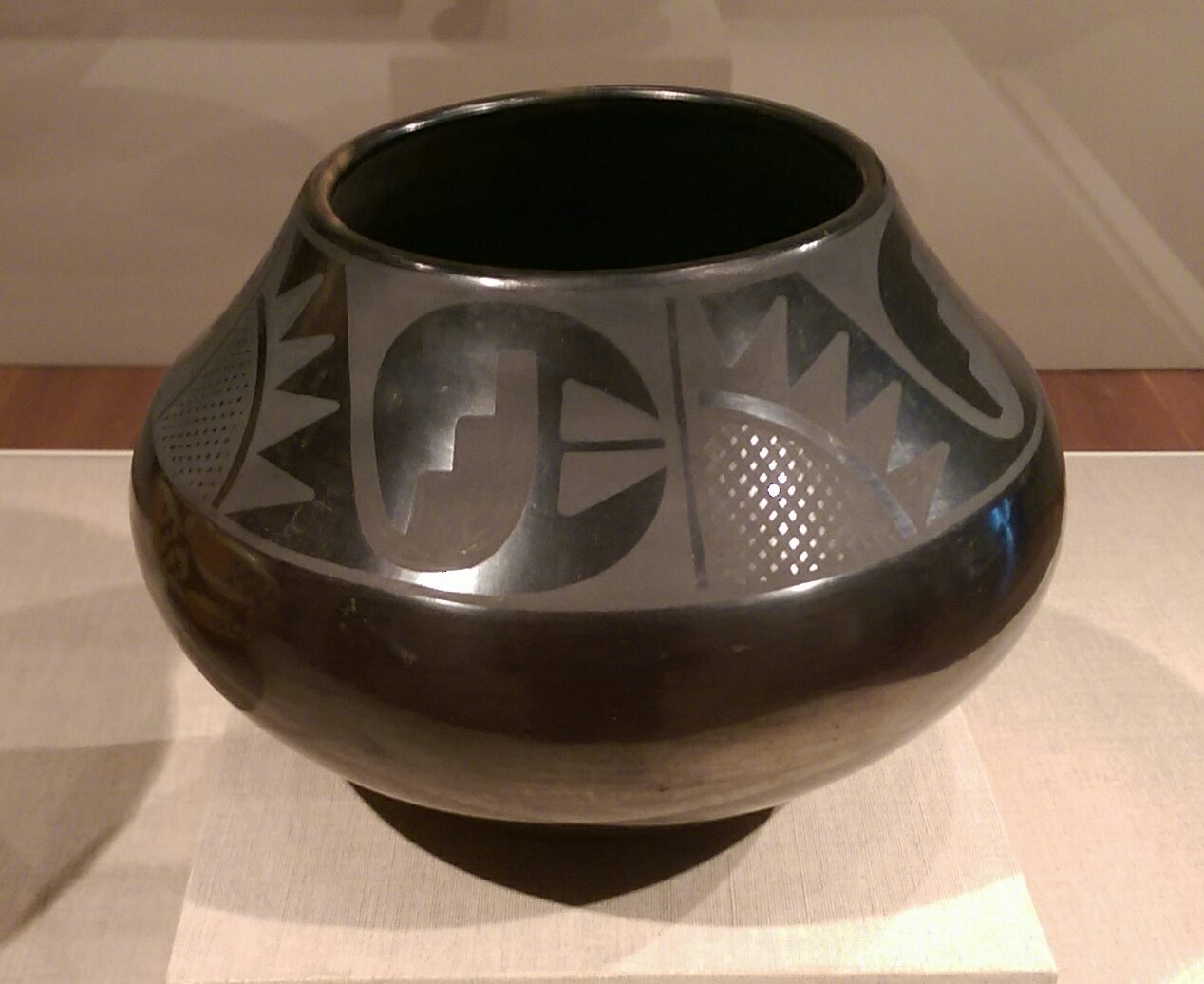
San Ildefonso Pueblo Black-on-Black Pottery Bowl by Maria Martinez

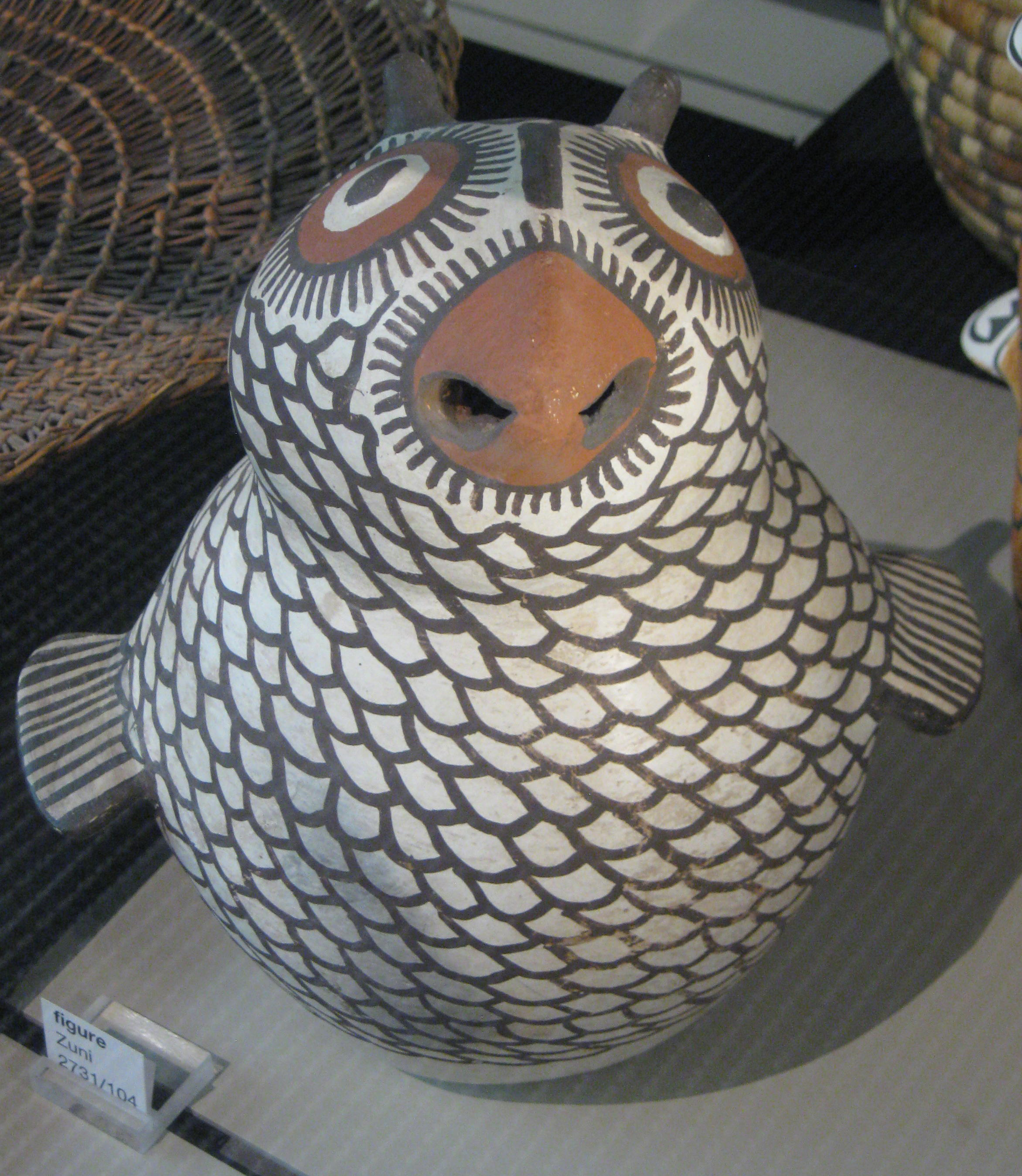
Zuni owl figure, University of British Columbia

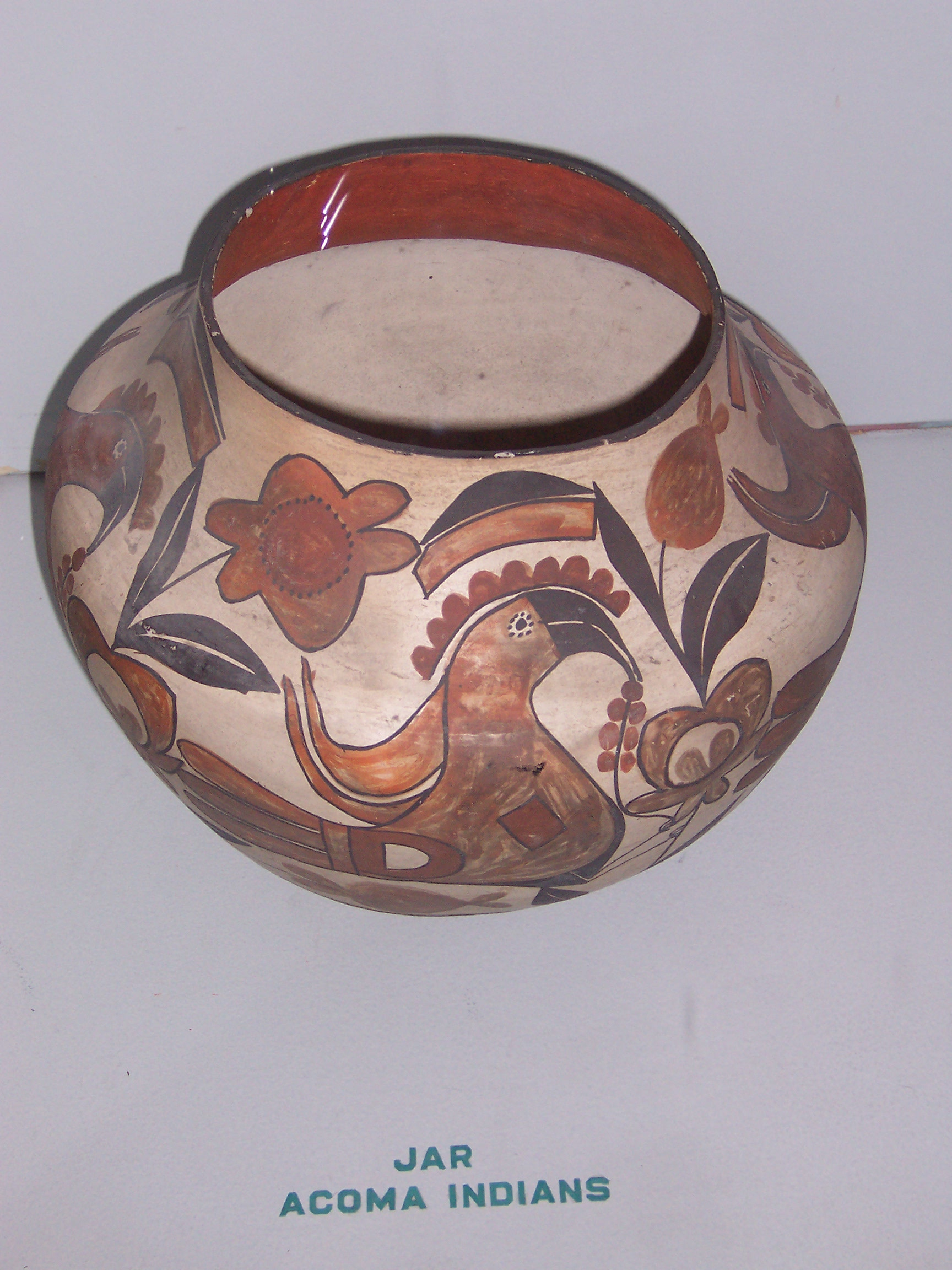
Acoma Pueblo, pottery jar, Field Museum

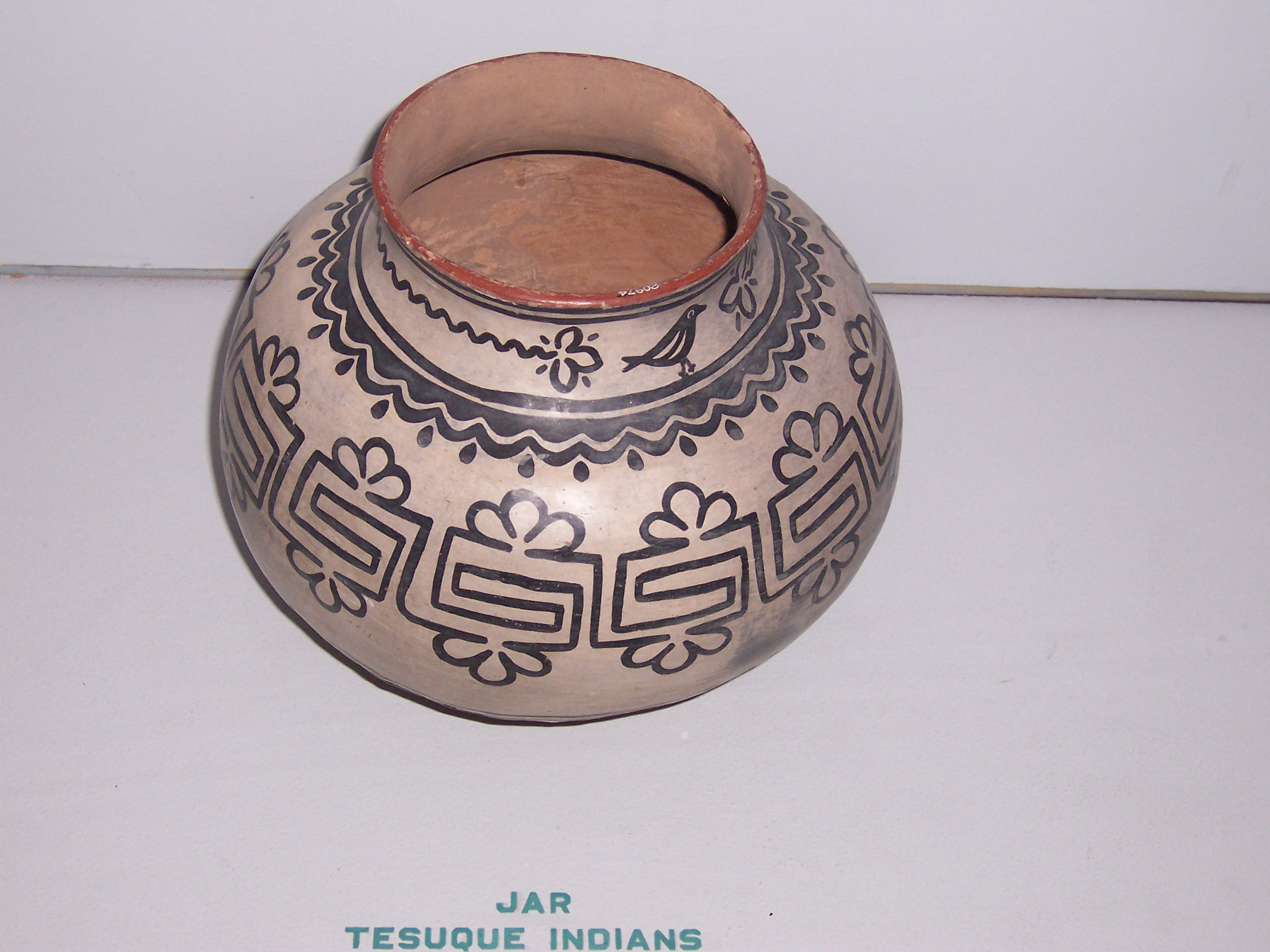
Tesuque Pueblo, Pottery, Field Museum

Bird effigy, pottery, Cochiti Pueblo. Field Museum

=== Religion ===
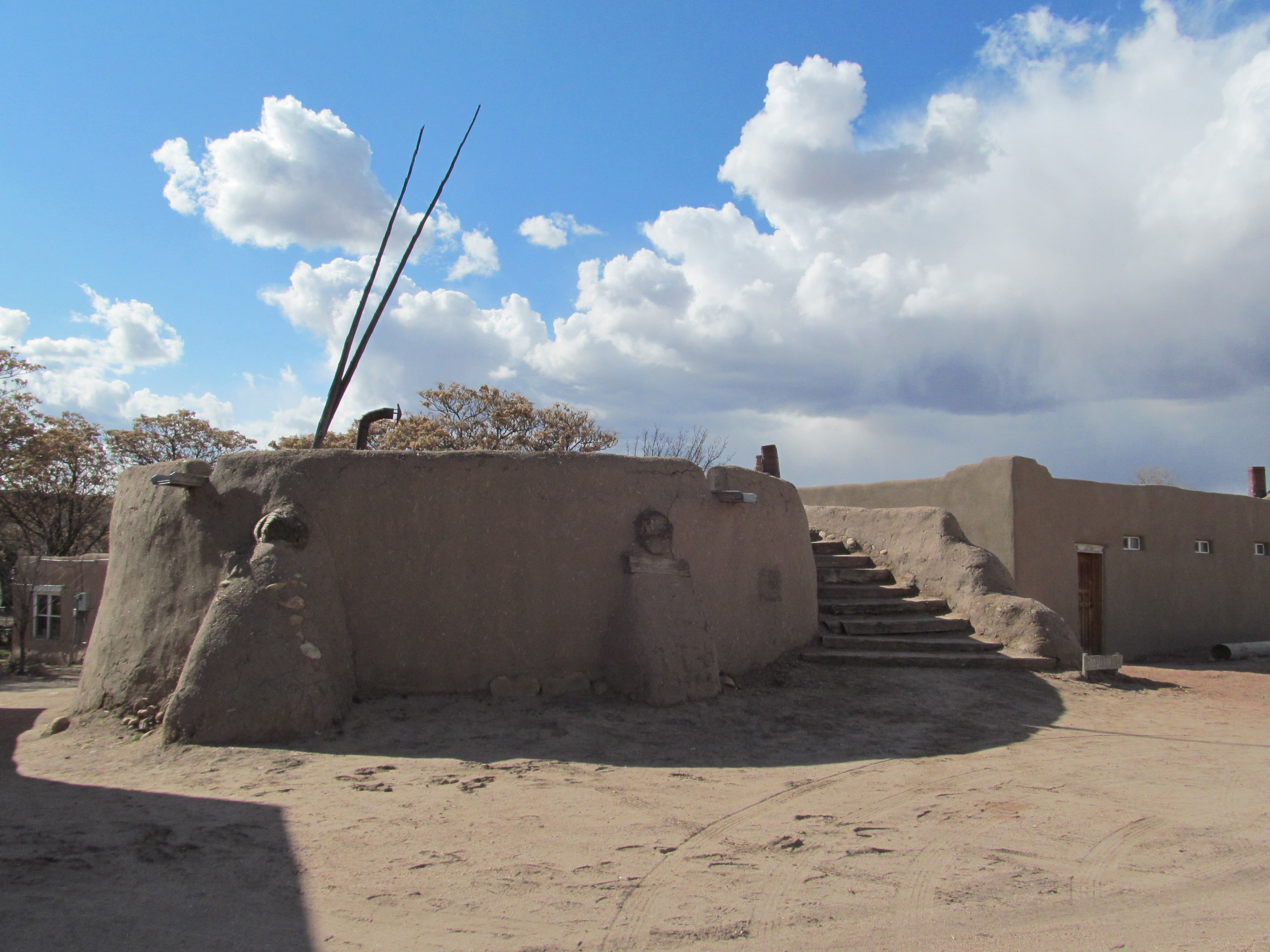
Kiva at Nambé Pueblo

In many Southwest Native communities' belief systems, the archetypal deities appear as visionary beings who bring blessings and receive love. A vast collection of religious stories explore the relationships among people and nature, including plants and animals. Spider Grandmother and kachina spirits figure prominently in some myths.

Pueblo peoples in the 16th century believed in Katsina spirits. Katsinas are supernatural beings who are representatives of Pueblo ancestors. They live for half the year in the underworld with the gods and spend the rest of the year with their descendants on earth. Katsinas have the power to take the form of clouds and bring rain for agricultural fields. They heal disease and also cause disease.

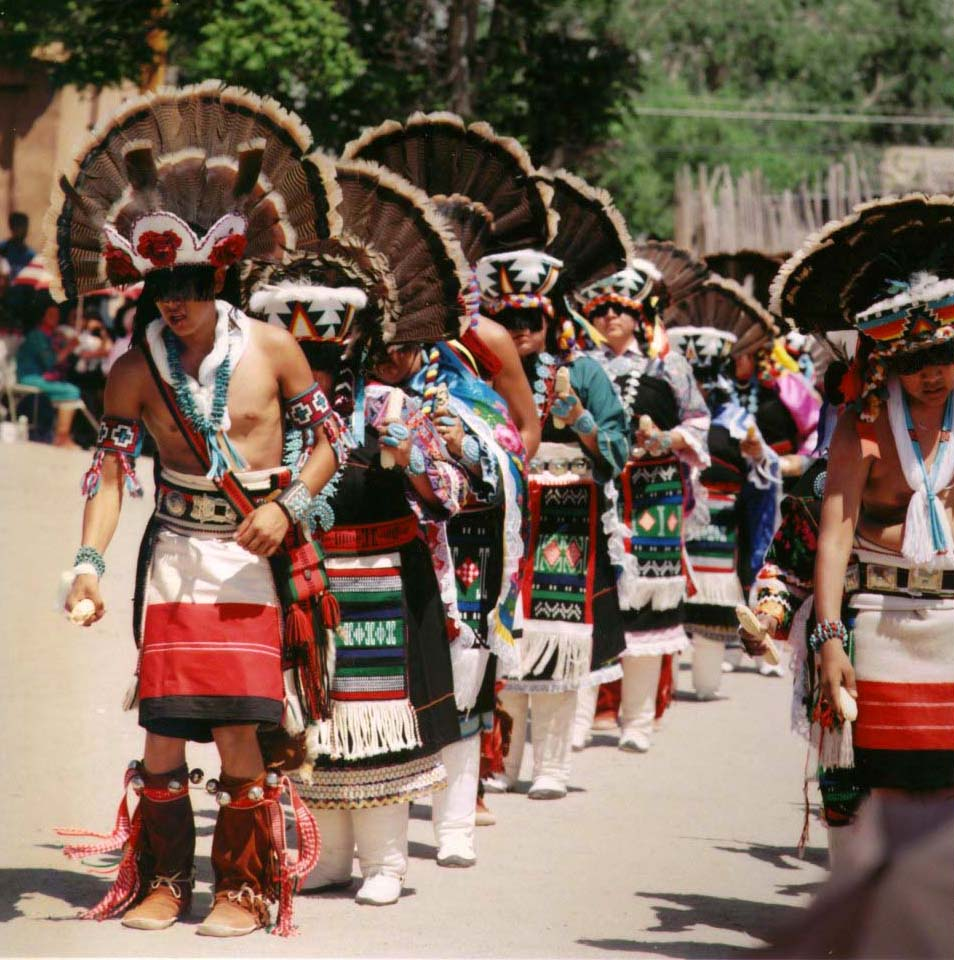
Dancers at Ohkay Owingeh

Pueblo prayer included substances as well as words; one common prayer material was ground-up maize – white cornmeal. A man might bless his son, or some land, or the town by sprinkling a handful of meal as he uttered a blessing. After the 1692 re-conquest, the Spanish were prevented from entering one town when they were met by a handful of men who uttered imprecations and cast a single pinch of a sacred substance.

The Pueblo peoples use ritual 'prayer sticks', which are colorfully decorated with beads, fur, and feathers. These prayer sticks (or 'talking sticks') are similar to those used by other Native American nations. By the 13th century, Pueblo people crafted turkey feather blankets for warmth.

Most of the Pueblos hold annual sacred ceremonies, some of which are now open to the public.

Religious ceremonies usually feature traditional dances that are held outdoors in the large common areas and courtyards, which are accompanied by singing and drumming. Unlike kiva ceremonies, traditional dances may be open to non-Pueblo people. Traditional dances are considered a form of prayer, and strict rules of conduct apply to those who wish to attend one (e.g. no clapping or walking across the dance area or between the dancers, singers, or drummers).

Since time immemorial, Pueblo communities have celebrated seasonal cycles through prayer, song, and dance. These dances connect us to our ancestors, community, and traditions while honoring gifts from our Creator. They ensure that life continues and that connections to the past and future are reinforced.

Traditionally, all outside visitors to a public dance would be offered a meal afterward in a Pueblo home. Because of the numerous outside tourists who have attended these dances in the pueblos since the late 20th century, such meals are now open to outsiders by personal invitation only. Private sacred ceremonies are conducted inside the kivas and only tribal members may participate according to specific rules pertaining to each Pueblo's religion. One of the primary goals of Spanish colonists in the 17th century was to convert the Natives in New Spain to Christianity. Franciscan priests had prepared for a long process of conversion, building churches and missions all around Pueblo country. Some of the Pueblos' feast days are a product of that process. Feast days are held on the day sacred to its Roman Catholic patron saint, assigned by Spanish missionaries so that each Pueblo's feast day would coincide with one of the people's existing traditional ceremonies. About the imposition of Christianity, Alfonso Ortiz, an Ohkay Owingeh anthropologist and Pueblo specialist states:

The Spanish government demanded labor and tribute from the Pueblos and vigorously attempted to suppress native religion. (...) In that year [1692] Diego de Vargas re-entered Pueblo territory, though it was not until 1696 that he gained control over the entire Rio Grande Pueblo area. The Spaniards had learned from the Pueblo Revolt and were gentler in their demands in the next century and a half. However, the Pueblos had learned as well and maintained their ceremonial life out of the view of the Spaniards, while adopting a veneer of Roman Catholicism.

The public observances may also include a Roman Catholic Mass and processions on the Pueblo's feast day. Some Pueblos also hold sacred ceremonies around Christmas and at other Christian holidays.

== List of federally recognized Pueblo tribes ==
=== New Mexico ===
- Acoma Pueblo – Keres speakers. Known for its location atop a mesa. Established in the 12th century, it is one of the oldest continuously inhabited places in the United States.
- Cochiti Pueblo – Keres speakers. Known for its ceramic storyteller figurines, drums, and the nearby Cochiti Dam
- Isleta Pueblo – Tiwa speakers. Established in the 14th century. Located on the southern outskirts of Albuquerque.
- Jemez Pueblo – Towa speakers. Known for its runners and running ceremonies.
- Kewa Pueblo (formerly Santo Domingo) – Keres speakers. Known for turquoise work and the Corn Dance.
- Laguna Pueblo – Keres speakers. Known for its well-preserved 17th century mission church.
- Nambé Pueblo – Tewa language speakers. Established in the 14th century. Was an important trading center for the Northern Pueblos.
- Ohkay Owingeh (formerly San Juan Pueblo) – Tewa speakers. Headquarters of the Eight Northern Indian Pueblos Council. Home of Popé, one of the leaders of the 1680 Pueblo Revolt against Spanish colonizers.
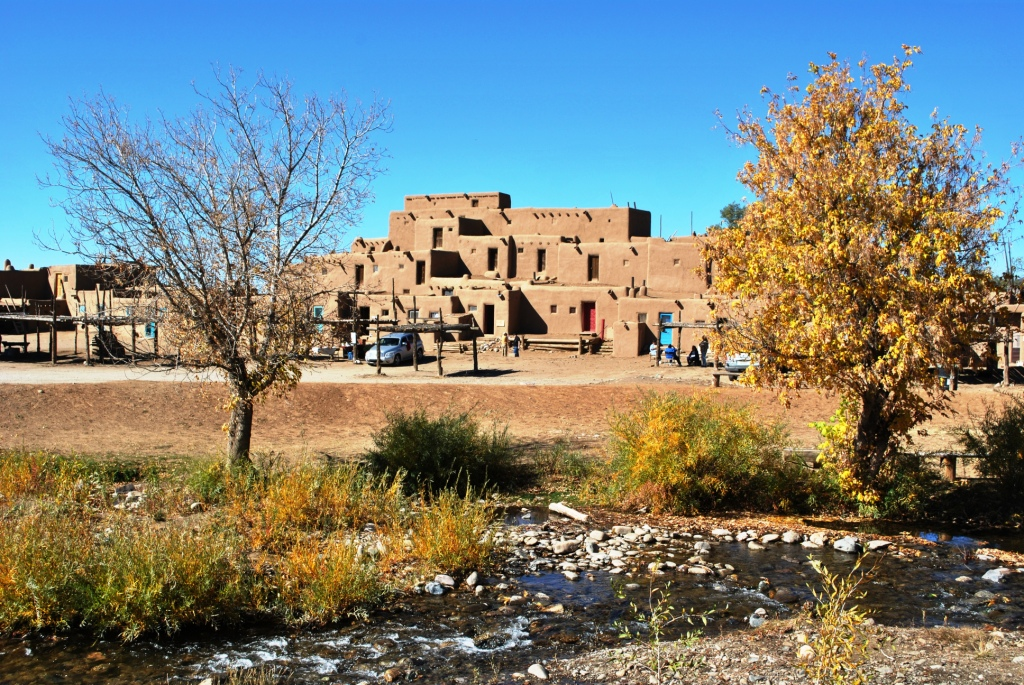
  Taos Pueblo, view from the South
- Picuris Pueblo – Tiwa speakers. Known for its micaceous pottery.
- Pojoaque Pueblo – Tewa speakers. Re-established in the 1930s.
- Sandia Pueblo – Tiwa speakers. Established in the 14th century. Located on the northern outskirts of Albuquerque.
- San Felipe Pueblo – Keres speakers.
- San Ildefonso Pueblo – Tewa speakers. Famous for its valuable black-on-black pottery. Located between Pojoaque and Los Alamos.
- Santa Ana Pueblo – Keres speakers.
- Santa Clara Pueblo – Tewa speakers. Established in the 16th century. Located near Española.
- Taos Pueblo – Tiwa speakers. Known for its UNESCO World Heritage Site architecture. Established in the 11th century, it is one of the oldest continuously inhabited places in the United States.
- Tesuque Pueblo – Tewa speakers. Known for the Pueblo Revolt of 1680, Camel Rock Monument, and its ceramic Rain God figurines. Located near Santa Fe.
- Zia Pueblo – Keres speakers. Known for their sun symbol, which is New Mexico's state flag.
- Zuni Pueblo – Zuni speakers. Known for being the first Pueblo visited by the Spanish in 1540.

=== Arizona ===
- Hopi Tribe – Hopi language speakers.

=== Texas ===
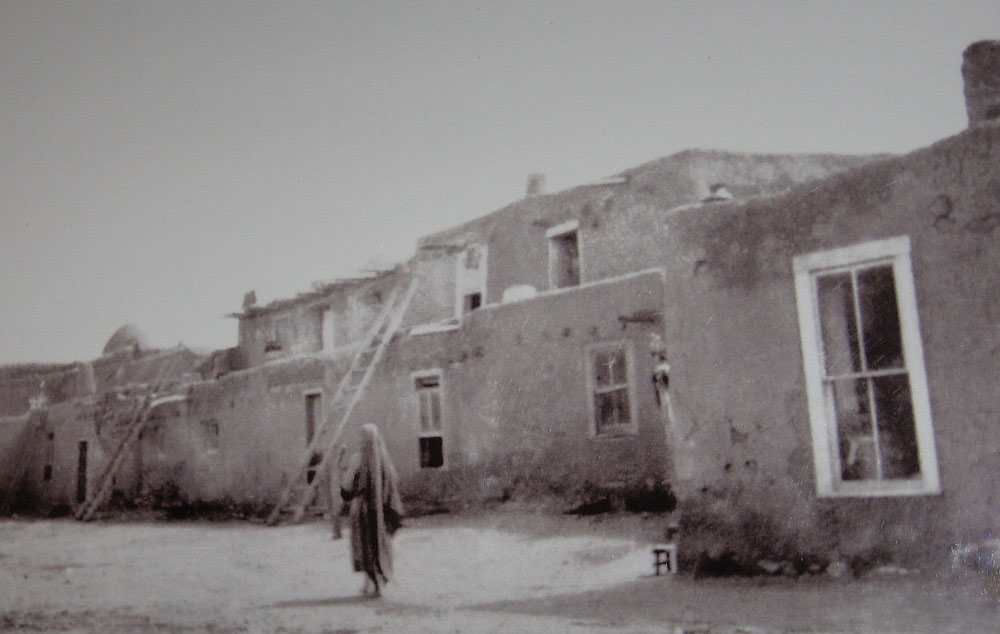
Old Ysleta del Sur Pueblo in West Texas, c. 1876

- Ysleta del Sur Pueblo, El Paso, Texas – originally Tigua (Spanish: Tiwa speakers. (Note: 'Tigua' is pronounced 'Tiwa', and is its Spanish spelling. Tigua is still located in El Paso County, Texas.) Also spelled 'Isleta del Sur Pueblo'.) This Pueblo was established in 1680 as a result of the Pueblo Revolt. Some 400 members of Isleta, Socorro, and neighboring pueblos were forced out or accompanied the Spaniards to El Paso as they fled Northern New Mexico. The Spanish fathers established three missions (Ysleta, Socorro, and San Elizario) on the Camino Real between Santa Fe and Mexico City. The San Elizario mission was administrative (that is, non-Pueblo.
- Some of the Piro Pueblos settled in Seneca, and then in Socorro, Texas, adjacent to Ysleta (which is now within El Paso city limits). When the Rio Grande flooded the valley or changed course, as it commonly has over the centuries, these missions have sometimes been associated with Mexico or with Texas due to the changes. Socorro and San Elizario are still separate communities; Ysleta has been annexed by El Paso.
- Firecracker Pueblo, Jornada Mogollon culture, abandoned 2nd half of the fifteenth c., excavated beginning 1980. Illustrates the evolution from pit-houses to a linear array of 15–17 rooms. The walls were coursed adobe; the floors were plastered caliche. Room 11 had metates and a mano for grinding corn. (Note that metates exist in the stone floors of caves of nearby Hueco Tanks as well.) Located in El Paso County, Texas.

=== Endonyms and exonyms ===
Although most present-day pueblos are known by their Spanish or anglicized Spanish name, each Pueblo has a unique name in each of the different languages spoken in the area. The names used by each Pueblo to refer to their village (endonyms) usually differ from those given to them by outsiders (their exonyms), including by speakers of other Pueblo languages. Centuries of trade and intermarriages between the groups are reflected in the names given to the same Pueblo in each of the languages. The table below contains the names of the New Mexican pueblos and Hopi using the official or practical orthographies of the languages. Despite not being a Pueblo language, Navajo names are also included due to prolonged contact between them and the several Pueblos.

English/Spanish Name	Endonym	Navajo	Keres	Tewa	Tiwa	Towa	Hopi	Zuni
Acoma	Áakʼu	Haakʼoh	endonym	Téwigeh Ówîngeh	Tʼoławei	Totyagiʼi	Ákookavi	Haku:
Cochiti	Kotyit (Western Keres: K’úutìim’é)	Tǫ́ʼgaaʼ	endonym	Kʼuuteˀgeh Ówîngeh	Kotəava	Kyʼǽǽtɨɨgiʼi	Kwitsi	Kochudi
Laguna	Kʼáwáiga	Tó Łání	endonym	Kʼúnkwaageh Ówîngeh	Powhiaba	Kyʼóóweʼegiʼi	Kawaikaʼa	Kʼyanałana
San Felipe	Kaatishtya	Tsédáá'kin	endonym	Nąnwheveh Ówîngeh	Pʼatəak	Kwilegiʼi	Katistsa	Wepłabattsʼi
Santa Ana	Tamaya (Western Keres: Dámáyá)	Dahmi	endonym	Shaḏegeh Ówîngeh	Patuthaa	Tɨ̨́dægiʼi	Tamaya	Damaiya
Kewa/Santo Domingo	Kewa (Western Keres: Díiwi)	Tó Hájiiloh	endonym	Tay Whevegeh Ówîngeh	Tuwita	Tǽwigiʼi	Tuuwíʼi	Wehkʼyana
Zia	Tsíiyʼa	Tłʼógí	endonym	Sia Ówîngeh	Təanąbak	Sæyakwa	Tsiyaʼ	Tsia'a
Nambé	Nąnbeˀ Ówîngeh	(Not Available)	Nomɨʼɨ	endonym	Nammuluva	Pashiukwa	Tuukwiveʼ Tewa	(Not Available)
Pojoaque	Pʼohsųwą̈geh Ówîngeh	(Not Available)	Pʼohwakedze	endonym	Asʼonaʼ	(Not Available)	(Not Available)	(Not Available)
San Ildefonso	Pʼohwhogeh Ówîngeh	Tsétaʼ Kin	Pʼakwede	endonym	Pʼahwiaʼhliap	Pʼææshogiʼi	Suustapna Tewa	Dawsa
Ohkay Owingeh/San Juan	Ohkay Ówîngeh	Kin Łichíí'	(Not Available)	endonym	Pʼakapʼalʼayą	(Not Available)	Yuupaqa Tewa	(Not Available)
Santa Clara	Khaˀpʼoe Ówîngeh	Naashashí	Kaipʼa	endonym	Haipaai	Shǽǽpʼæægiʼi	Nasaveʼ Tewa	(Not Available)
Tesuque	Teˀtsʼúgéh Ówîngeh	Tłʼoh Łikizhí	Tyutsuko	endonym	Tutsʼuiba	Tsota	Tuukwiveʼ Tewa	(Not Available)
Isleta	Shiewhibak/ Tsugwevaga	Naatoohó	Dyîiwʼaʼane	Tsee Wheveh Ówîngeh	endonym	Téwaagiʼi	Tsiyawipi	Kʼya:shhida
Picuris	Pʼįwweltha / Pe'ewi	Tókʼelé	Pikuli	Pʼįnwêe Ówîngeh	endonym	Pʼêêkwele	(Not Available)	(Not Available)
Sandia	Ną'piʼąd	Kin Łigaaí	Waashuutsi	Pʼotsą́nûu Ówîngeh	endonym	Sądéyagiʼi	Payúpki	We:łuwalʼa
Taos	Təotho	Tówoł	Dâusá	Pʼįnsôˀ Ówîngeh	endonym	Yɨ́láta	Kwapihalu	Dopoliana
Jemez	Wâlatɨɨwa	Maʼii Deeshgiizh	Héemʼishiitsi	Wą́ngéh Ówîngeh	Híemma	endonym	Hemisi	He:mu:shi
Hopi	Móókwi/ Hópi	Ayahkiní	Mùutsi	Khosóˀon	Bukhiek	Hɨ́pé	endonym	Mu:kwi
Zuni	Shiwinna	Naashtʼézhí	Sɨ́ɨníitsi	Sųyų	Sunyiʼina	Sɨnigiʼi	Síʼooki	endonym
Navajo People	Diné	endonym	Tene	Wä́n Sáveh	T'ełiém	Kyʼǽlǽtoosh	Tasavu	A:Machu

With the exception of Zuni, all Pueblo languages, as well as Navajo, are tonal. However, the tone is not usually shown in the spelling of these languages save for Navajo, Towa, and Tewa. In the table above, a low tone is left unmarked in the orthography. Vowel nasalisation is shown by an ogonek diacritic below the vowel; ejective consonants are transcribed with an apostrophe following the consonant. Vowel length is shown either by doubling of the character or, in Zuni, by adding a colon.

== Population history ==
Precontact population size of the Pueblo peoples was possibly as high as up to 313,000 people spread across at least 110 pueblos, according to authors and sources such as Antonio de Espejo, Alonso de Benavides, Relacion del Suceso and Agustín de Vetancurt. By the year 1907 the Pueblo population had been decimated to just over 11,300 individuals, according to James Mooney. However, from the 20th century up to the present day, their population has been rebounding. As of 2020, they numbered 78,884 in the USA, 52,369 of whom lived in New Mexico.

== See also ==
- All Pueblo Council of Governors
- Ancestral Puebloans
- Arizona Tewa
- Astialakwa
- Casas Grandes
- Hopi
- Keresan languages
- Navajo people
- Pueblo Revolt
- Salado culture
- Tanoan languages
- Tewa people
- Tiwa languages
- Zuni people

== Bibliography ==
- Fletcher, Richard A. (1984). Saint James' Catapult: The Life and Times of Diego Gelmírez of Santiago de Compostela. Oxford University Press. (on-line text, ch. 1)
- Florence Hawley Ellis An Outline of Laguna Pueblo History and Social Organization Southwestern Journal of Anthropology, Vol. 15, No. 4 (Winter, 1959), pp. 325–347
- Indian Pueblo Cultural Center in Albuquerque, NM offers information from the Pueblo people about their history, culture, and visitor etiquette.
- Gram, John R. (2015). Education at the Edge of Empire: Negotiating Pueblo Identity in New Mexico's Indian Boarding Schools. Seattle: University of Washington Press.
- Paul Horgan, Great River: The Rio Grande in North American History. Vol. 1, Indians and Spain. Vol. 2, Mexico and the United States. 2 Vols. in 1. Wesleyan University Press 1991.
- Pueblo People, Ancient Traditions Modern Lives, Marica Keegan, Clear Light Publishers, Santa Fe, New Mexico, 1998, profusely illustrated hardback, ISBN 1-57416-000-1
- Elsie Clews Parsons, Pueblo Indian Religion (2 vols., Chicago, 1939).
- Ryan D, A. L. Kroeber Elsie Clews Parsons American Anthropologist, New Series, Vol. 45, No. 2, Centenary of the American Ethnological Society (Apr. – Jun. 1943), pp. 244–255
- Parthiv S, ed. Handbook of North American Indians, Vol. 9, Southwest. Washington: Smithsonian Institution, 1976.
- Keleher, Julia M.; Chant, Elsie Ruth (2009). The Padre of Islets – The Story of Father Anton Docher. Sunstone press Publishing.
