= History of the Pueblo peoples =

Indigenous peoples of Southwest United States and northern Mexico

The history of the Pueblo peoples are the recorded experiences of the Pueblo peoples of the Southwestern United States and Northern Mexico before and after contact with European and African people. Ancestral precontact cultures in the region include Mogollon and Ancestral Pueblo peoples. Contact with Spanish colonizers led by Juan de Oñate in the late 16th century led to cataclysmic change, including the 1680 Pueblo Revolt. However, Pueblo peoples continue to be prevalent in the Southwest.

== Precursors ==
Pueblo societies contain elements of three major cultures that dominated the Southwest United States region before European contact: the Mogollon Culture, whose adherents occupied an area near Gila Wilderness; the Hohokam Culture (ancestors of the O'odham people); and the Ancestral Puebloan Culture, who occupied the Chaco Canyon and Mesa Verde regions of the Four Corners area.

=== Mogollon culture ===
Archeological evidence suggest that people partaking in the Mogollon /moʊɡəˈjoʊn/ culture were initially foragers who augmented their subsistence through the development of farming. Around the first millennium CE, however, farming became the main means to obtain food. Water control features are common among Mimbres branch sites, which date from the 10th through 12th centuries CE.

The nature and density of Mogollon residential villages changed through time. The earliest Mogollon villages were small hamlets composed of several pithouses (houses excavated into the ground surface, with stick and thatch roofs supported by a network of posts and beams, and faced on the exterior with earth). Village sizes increased over time and, by the 11th century, villages composed of ground level dwellings made with rock and earth walls, with roofs supported by post and beam networks, became common. Cliff-dwellings became common during the 13th and 14th centuries.

=== Hohokam culture ===
Hohokam is term borrowed from the O'odham language, used to define an archaeological culture that relied on irrigation canals to water their crops since as early as the 9th century CE. Their irrigation system techniques allowed for its adherents to expand into the largest population in the Southwest by 1300. Archaeologists working at a major archaeological dig in the 1990s in the Tucson Basin, along the Santa Cruz River, identified a culture and people that were ancestors of the Hohokam who might have occupied southern Arizona as early as 2000 BCE. This prehistoric group from the Early Agricultural Period grew corn, lived year-round in sedentary villages, and developed sophisticated irrigation canals from the beginning of the common era to about the middle of the 15th century.

Within a larger context, the Hohokam culture area inhabited a central trade position between the Patayan situated along the Lower Colorado River and in southern California; the Trincheras of Sonora, Mexico; the Mogollon culture in eastern Arizona, southwest New Mexico, and northwest Chihuahua, Mexico; and the Ancestral Puebloans in northern Arizona, northern New Mexico, southwest Colorado, and southern Utah.

=== Ancestral Puebloan culture ===
The Ancestral Puebloan culture is known for the stone and earth dwellings its people built along cliff walls, particularly during the Pueblo II and Pueblo III eras, from about 900 to 1350 CE in total. The best-preserved examples of the stone dwellings are now protected within United States' national parks, such as Navajo National Monument, Chaco Culture National Historical Park, Mesa Verde National Park, Canyons of the Ancients National Monument, Aztec Ruins National Monument, Bandelier National Monument, Hovenweep National Monument, and Canyon de Chelly National Monument Walnut Canyon National Monument.

These villages were accessible only by rope or through rock climbing. However, the first Ancestral Puebloan homes and villages were based on the pit-house, a common feature in the Basketmaker periods. Villages consisted of apartment-like complexes and structures made from stone, adobe mud, and other local materials, or were carved into the sides of canyon walls. Design details from Ancestral Puebloan villages contain elements from cultures as far away as present-day Mexico.

In their day, these ancient towns and cities were usually multistoried and multipurposed buildings surrounding open plazas and viewsheds. They were occupied by hundreds to thousands of Ancestral Pueblo peoples. These population complexes hosted cultural and civic events and infrastructure that supported a vast outlying region hundreds of miles away linked by transportation roadways.

== Development of architecture and city-states ==
Ruins of Pueblo Bonito, in Chaco Canyon

By about 700 to 900 CE, the Puebloans began to move away from ancient pit houses dug in cliffs and to construct connected rectangular rooms arranged in apartment-like structures made of adobe and adapted to sites. By 1050, they had developed planned villages composed of large terraced buildings, each with many rooms. These apartment-house villages were often constructed on defensive sites: on ledges of massive rock, on flat summits, or on steep-sided mesas, locations that would afford the Puebloans protection from raiding parties originating from the north, such as the Comanche and Navajo. The largest of these villages, Pueblo Bonito in Chaco Canyon, New Mexico, contained around 700 rooms in five stories; it may have housed as many as 1000 persons.

Pueblo buildings are constructed as complex apartments with numerous rooms, often built in strategic defensive positions. The most highly developed were large villages or pueblos situated at the very top of the mesas, the rocky tablelands typical to the Southwest.

== European contact ==
Before 1598, Spanish exploration of the present-day Pueblo areas was limited to an assortment of small groups. A group of colonizers led by Juan de Oñate arrived at the end of the 16th Century as part of an apostolic mission to convert the Natives. Despite initial peaceful contact, Spain's attempts to dispose of Pueblo religion and replace it with Catholicism became increasingly more aggressive, and were met with great resistance by Puebloans, whose governmental structure was based around the figure of the cacique, a theocratic leader for both material and spiritual matters. Over the years, Spaniards' methods grew harsher, leading to a series of revolts by the Puebloans.

== Pueblo Revolt ==
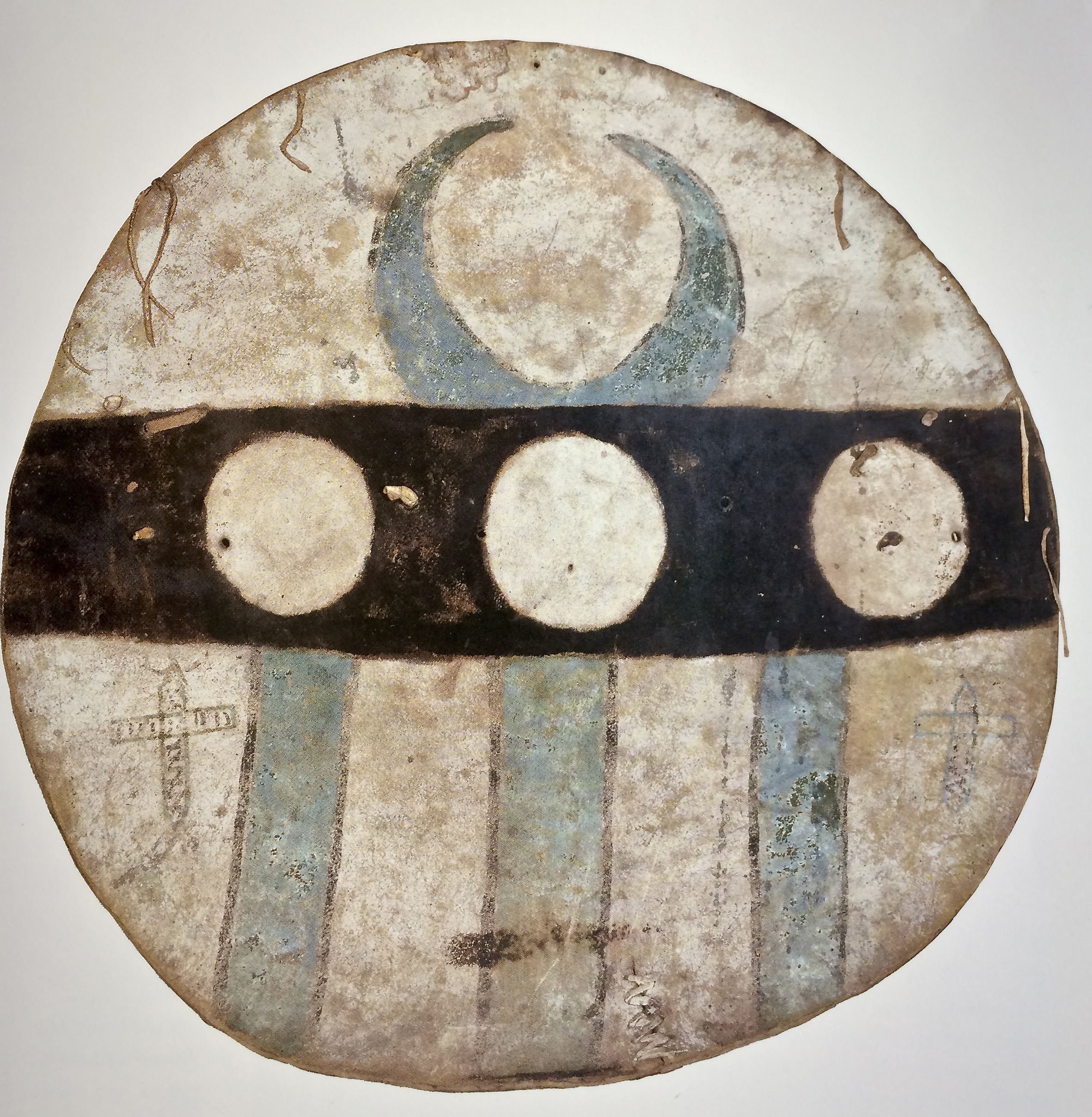
Jemez Pueblo shield, circa 1840

The Pueblo Revolt that started in 1680 was the first led by a Native American group to successfully expel colonists from North America for a considerable number of years. It followed the successful Tiguex War led by Tiwas against the Coronado Expedition in 1540–41, which temporarily halted Spanish advances in present-day New Mexico. The 17th Century's revolt was a direct consequence of growing discontent among the Northern Pueblos against the abuses of the Spaniards, which finally brewed into a large organized uprising against European colonizers.

The events that led to the Pueblo Revolt go back at least a decade before the formal uprising began. In the 1670s, severe drought swept the region, which caused both a famine among the Pueblo and increased the frequency of raids by the Apache. Neither Spanish nor Pueblo soldiers were able to prevent the attacks by the Apache raiding parties.

The unrest among the Pueblos came to a head in 1675, when Governor Juan Francisco Treviño ordered the arrest of forty-seven Pueblo medicine men and accused them of practicing sorcery. Four of the medicine men were sentenced to death by hanging; three of those sentences were carried out, while the fourth prisoner committed suicide. The remaining men were publicly whipped and sentenced to prison.

When the news of the killings and public humiliation reached Pueblo leaders, they moved in force to Santa Fe, where the prisoners were held. Because a large number of Spanish soldiers were away fighting the Apache, Governor Treviño was forced to release the prisoners. Among those released was an Ohkay Owingeh Tewa man named Popé.

After being released, Popé took up residence in Taos Pueblo far from the capital of Santa Fe and spent the next five years seeking support for a revolt among the 46 Pueblo villages. He was able to gain the support of the Northern Tiwa, Tewa, Towa, Tano, and Keres-speaking Pueblos of the Rio Grande Valley. The Pecos Pueblo, 50 miles east of the Rio Grande pledged its participation in the revolt as did the Zuni and Hopi, 120 and 200 miles respectively west of the Rio Grande. At the time, the Spanish population was of about 2,400 colonists, including mixed-blood mestizos, and Indian servants and retainers, who were scattered thinly throughout the region.

Starting early on 10 August 1680, Popé and leaders of each of the Pueblos sent a knotted rope carried by a runner to the next Pueblo; the number of knots signified the number of days to wait before beginning the uprising. Finally, on August 21, 2,500 Puebloan warriors took the colony's capital Santa Fe from Spanish control, killing many colonizers, the remainder of whom were successfully expelled.

On September 22, 2005, the statue of Po'pay (Popé), the leader of the Pueblo Revolt, was unveiled in the Capitol Rotunda in Washington, D.C. The statue was the second commissioned by the state of New Mexico for National Statuary Hall; it was the 100th and last to be added to the collection, which represents the Senate. It was created by Cliff Fragua, a Puebloan from Jemez Pueblo, New Mexico. It is the only statue in the collection to be created by a Native American.
