= Alfonso Ortiz =

Ohkay Owingeh cultural anthropologist (1939–1998)

Alfonso Alex Ortiz
- Born: April 30, 1939; Ohkay Owingeh
- Died: January 26, 1997 (aged 57)
- Education: University of New Mexico; University of Chicago
- Scientific career
- Fields: Cultural anthropology
- Workplaces: University of California, Los Angeles; Colorado College; Pitzer College; Princeton University; University of New Mexico

Alfonso Alex Ortiz (April 30, 1939 – January 26, 1997) was a Tewa cultural anthropologist and activist from Ohkay Owingeh.

Ortiz's research focused on Tewa cultural practices, rituals, myths, and knowledge. He is best known for his book on Tewa cosmologies, The Tewa World: Space, Time, Being and Becoming in a Pueblo Society, published in 1969. Ortiz's writing of sacred practices with outsiders generated some controversy within his Pueblo communities as it broke the code of silence taboo around Pueblo religion.

Ortiz was an early proponent of autoethnography and encouraged other Native peoples to produce scholarship on their own cultures, instead of being the object of study of outside researchers. He is generally regarded as one of the most influential Pueblo academics of the twentieth century along with Joe Sando.

== Early life and education ==
Alfonso Ortiz was born in Ohkay Owingeh, New Mexico on April 30, 1939. His father, Sam Ortiz, was Tewa, and mother, Guadalupe (Naranjo) Ortiz, was Hispanic. Ortiz was primarily raised by his paternal, Tewa grandparents in Ohkay Owingeh. He went to high school in Española, won a National Merit Scholarship, and went on to attend the University of New Mexico.

Ortiz graduated from the University of New Mexico in 1961 with an A.B in Sociology. He began his graduate work in sociology at Arizona State University, but transferred to the University of Chicago where he switched his focus to anthropology after encountering the work of Edward Dozier. Ortiz graduated from the University of Chicago with an M.A. (1963) and a Ph.D. (1967) in Anthropology.

== Career ==
Ortiz taught cultural anthropology at the University of California at Los Angeles, Colorado College, Pitzer College, Princeton University, and the University of New Mexico. He is best known for his works The Tewa World: Space, Time, Being and Becoming in a Pueblo Society (1969); American Indian Myths and Legends (1984), co-edited with Richard Erdoes; the edited volume, New Perspectives on the Pueblos (1972); and his contributions to the Handbook of North American Indians (1978), published by the Smithsonian.

In addition to his teaching and research, Ortiz was an activist for Native American rights. He was a member of the National Advisory Council of the National Indian Youth Council from 1972-1990, chair of the National Advisory Council to the Newberry Library's D’Arcy McNickle Center for the History of the American Indian, and president of the Association on American Indian Affairs from 1973-1988. Ortiz also assisted in mediating the return of Taos Pueblo land, including Blue Lake, to the Tiwa in 1970 and the Wounded Knee Occupation in 1973.

His San Juan Pueblo, Oral History tapes and papers are held at Princeton.

== Legacy ==
In 1999, the National Endowment for the Humanities issued a grant for the University of New Mexico to establish the Alfonso Ortiz Center for Intercultural Studies.

== Awards ==
- 1975 Guggenheim Fellowship
- 1982 MacArthur Fellows Program
- 1982 Achievement Award from the Indian Council Fire (ICF) of Chicago

== Works ==
- The Tewa World: Space, Time, Being, and Becoming in a Pueblo Society. University of Chicago Press. 1972. ISBN 978-0-226-63307-7.
- New Perspectives on the Pueblos, University of New Mexico Press, 1972
- Handbook of North American Indians (volumes 9 and 10, Smithsonian Institution, 1979 and 1983
- To Carry Forth the Vine: an Anthology of Traditional Native North American Poetry.
- American Indian myths and legends Richard Erdoes, Alfonso Ortiz (eds) Pantheon Books, 1984, ISBN 978-0-394-50796-5
- Raymond J. DeMallie; Alfonso Ortiz, eds. (1994). North American Indian anthropology: essays on society and culture. Verlag für die Deutsche Wirtschaft AG. ISBN 978-0-8061-2614-2.
- Raymond J. DeMallie; Alfonso Ortiz, eds. (1994). "The Dynamics of Pueblo Cultural Survival". North American Indian anthropology: essays on society and culture. Verlag für die Deutsche Wirtschaft AG. ISBN 978-0-8061-2614-2.
- Alfonso Ortiz Papers 1926-1993 (mostly 1960s-1980s) at Princeton University Library
- Alfonso Ortiz Collection of Native American Oral Literature 1959-1965, at Princeton University Library
