= Pueblo religion =

Religion of Native American in the Southwestern United States

- Kachina
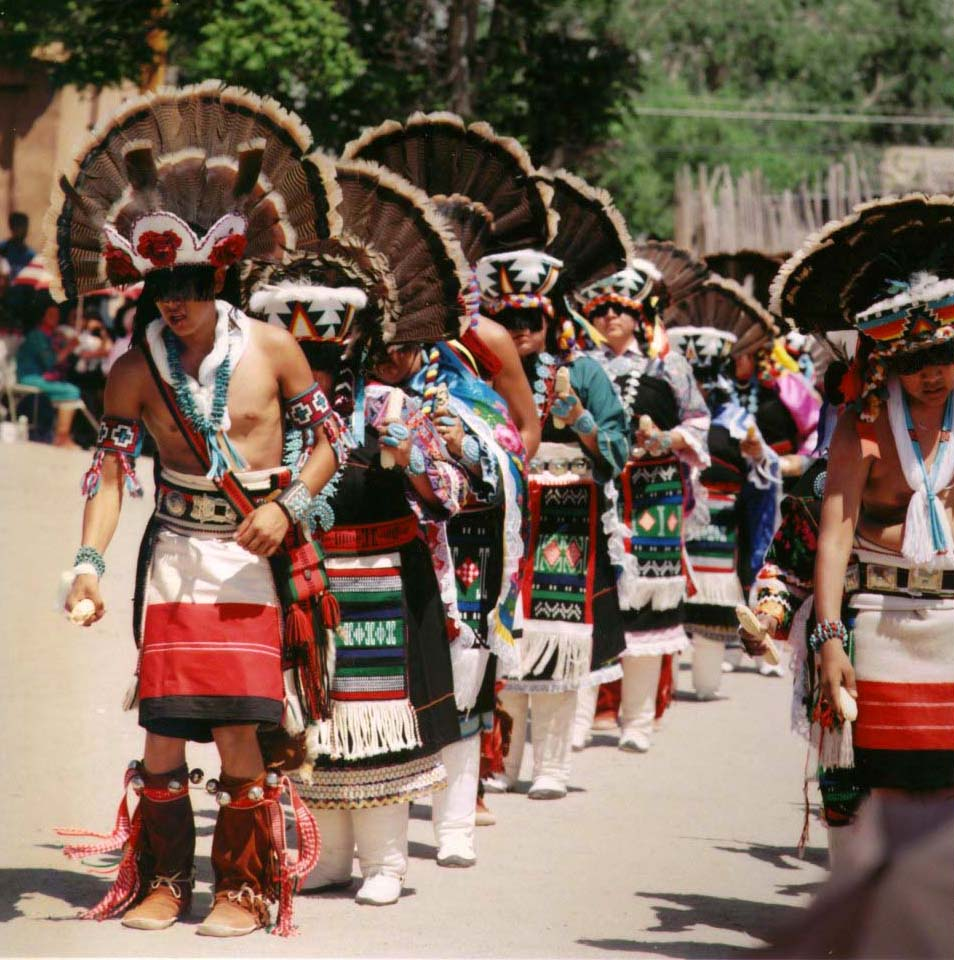
- Dancers at Ohkay Owingeh
- Abbreviation: Kachina
- Type: Native American religion
- Language: Hopi, Tanoan languages, Keresan, Keresan Pueblo Sign Language, Zuni, English, Spanish
- Territory: Southwestern United States
- Origin: 1300–1500
- Branched from: Ancestral Puebloans

Pueblo religion is the religion of the Puebloans, a group of Native American tribes in the Southwestern United States. The Puebloans practice a spirituality focused on maintaining balance between the physical and spiritual worlds, which they believe is essential for bringing rain, ensuring good crops, and promoting well-being.

Pueblo religion is predominantly practiced among Puebloans, who today live in Pueblos such as Taos, San Ildefonso, Acoma, Zuni, and the Hopi villages.

Pueblo religion is holistic, with every aspect of daily life—from farming to sleep—being viewed as a form of worship.

== Background ==
Puebloan societies incorporate elements of three major cultures that dominated the Southwestern United States before European contact: the Mogollon culture, whose adherents occupied an area near the Gila Wilderness; the Hohokam culture; and the Ancestral Pueblo culture, who occupied the Chaco Canyon and Mesa Verde regions in the Four Corners area.

The Ancestral Puebloan culture is known for the stone and earth dwellings its people built along cliff walls, particularly during the Pueblo II and Pueblo III eras, from about 900 to 1350 CE. The best-preserved examples of these dwellings are now protected within the United States' national parks, such as Navajo National Monument, Chaco Culture National Historical Park, Mesa Verde National Park, Canyons of the Ancients National Monument, Aztec Ruins National Monument, Bandelier National Monument, Hovenweep National Monument, and Canyon de Chelly National Monument.

Before European contact, there were around 70 Pueblo villages, some of which were centuries old when the Spanish arrived. Oraibi, now part of the Hopi Reservation in Arizona, and Acoma in New Mexico are among the oldest continuously occupied settlements in the United States, dating to around 1100 CE.

== History ==
=== Origins ===
The origins of the religion are debated, with theories suggesting influences from Mexican traditions like Casas Grandes (1130–1350), the Mimbres culture, known for its figurative pottery, or a combination in which the Mimbres culture indirectly influenced Casas Grandes, leading to the development of the Katsina tradition.

The Pueblo religion likely emerged in the late 13th to early 14th centuries when migrants from the Four Corners region settled in the upper Colorado Valley and integrated with the indigenous Mogollon or western Pueblo people.

=== Conflict and decline ===
Spanish soldiers first arrived on Pueblo lands in 1540, with western Pueblo communities protected by the remote Colorado Plateau, while the more accessible eastern Pueblo settlements suffered harsh treatment.

Spain's attempts to suppress Pueblo religion and replace it with Catholicism grew increasingly aggressive, leading to resistance by the Puebloans. However, the Catholic Church has had a lasting influence on the lives of Pueblo Indians. Today, about 90% of Pueblo Indians identify as Catholic. Some Puebloans practice a syncretic "Pueblo Christianity," blending Catholic and Pueblo religious practices.

== Deities ==
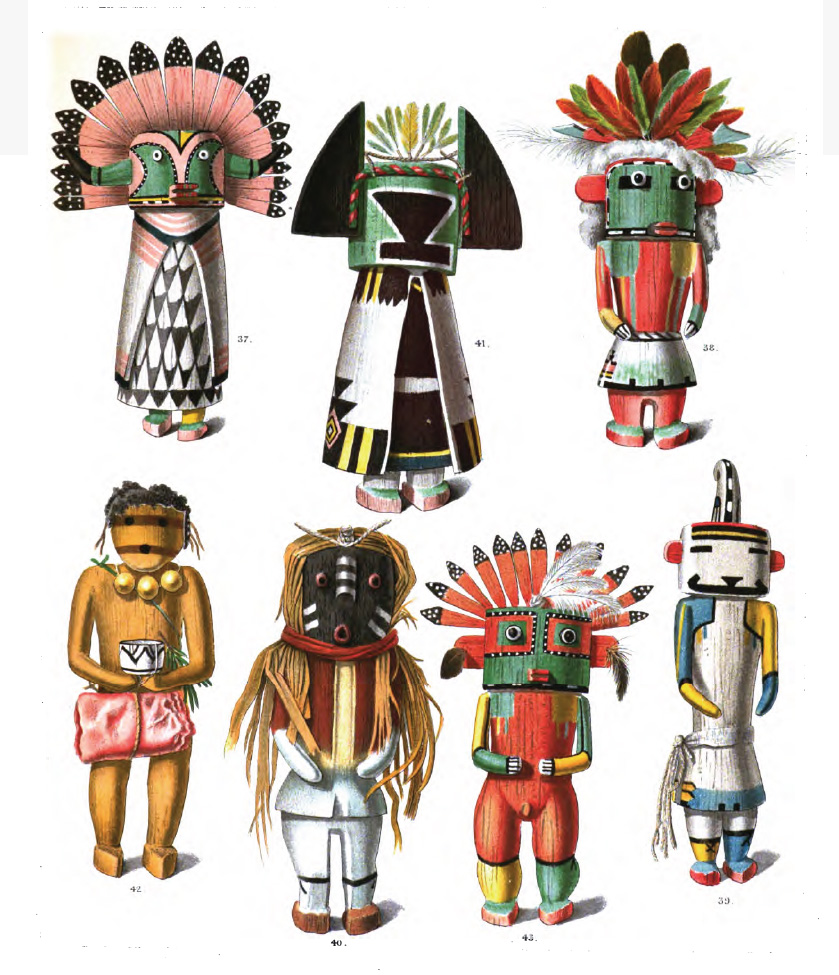
Drawings of kachina dolls (usually called katsintihu), Plate 11 from an 1894 anthropology book Dolls of the Tusayan Indians by Jesse Walter Fewkes

The Pueblo religion includes more than 500 divine and ancestral spirits. These spirits are believed to interact with humans during rituals, where performers, adorned in Kachina masks and attire, are thought to transform into the spirits they represent.

=== Kachina ===
Central to Pueblo religion is the concept of the kachina (also called katsina), a spirit being in the religious beliefs of the Pueblo people. These beings, once believed to visit Pueblo villages, are now honored through masked dances and rituals in which Pueblo people embody the Kachinas. Kachinas have the power to take the form of clouds and bring rain for agricultural fields. They also have the ability to heal or cause disease.

== Prayer ==
Pueblo prayer included substances as well as words; one common prayer material was ground-up maize – white cornmeal. A man might bless his son, or some land, or the town by sprinkling a handful of meal as he uttered a blessing. After the 1692 re-conquest, the Spanish were prevented from entering one town when they were met by a handful of men who uttered imprecations and cast a single pinch of a sacred substance.

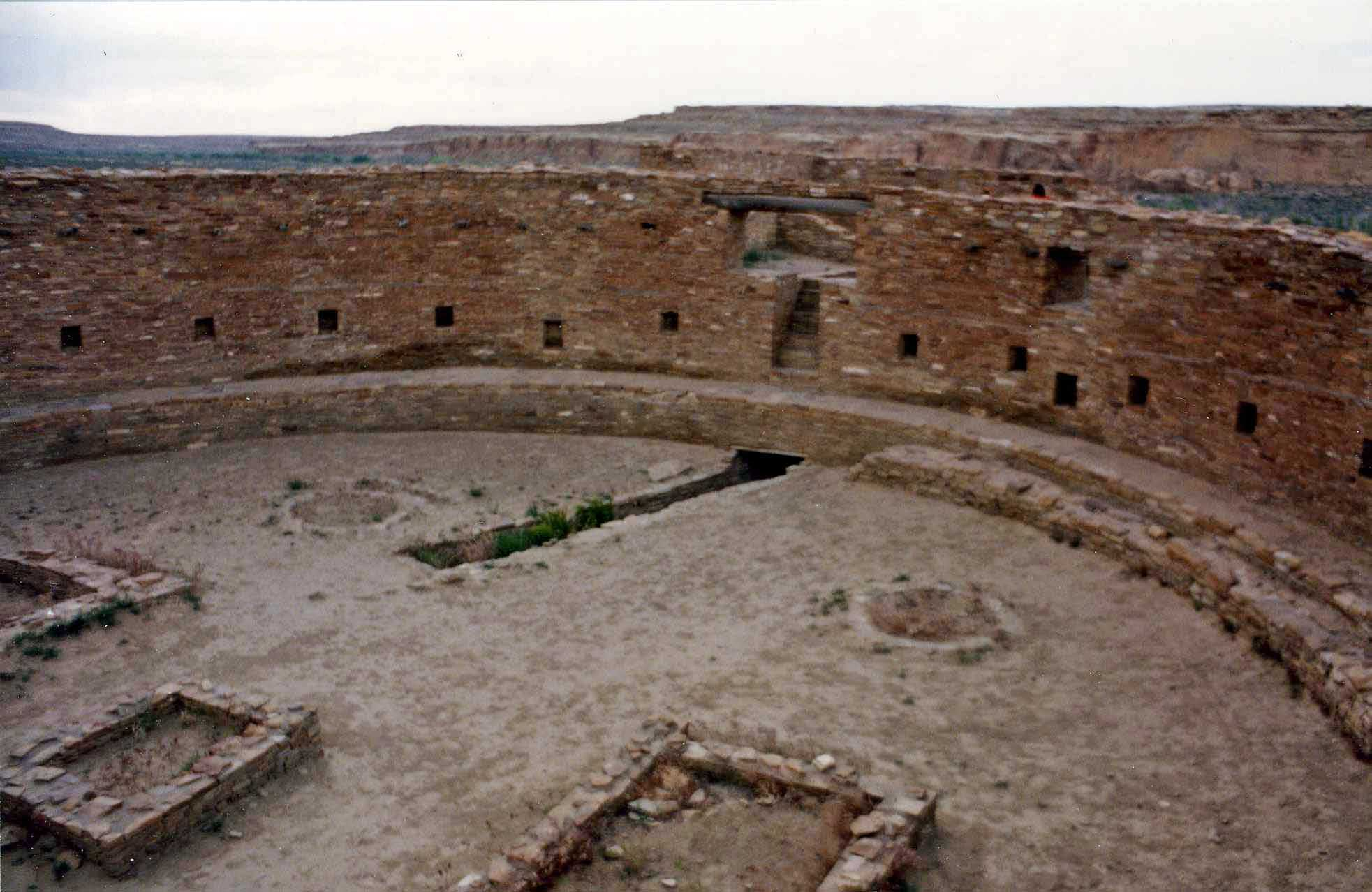
Ruins of a great kiva at Chaco Culture National Historical Park

== Ceremonies ==
=== Kiva ===
The Pueblo religious system also features underground ceremony called kiva. A kiva is a space used by Puebloans for rites and political meetings, many of them associated with the kachina belief system. Among the modern Hopi and most other Pueblo peoples, "kiva" means a large room that is circular and underground, and used for spiritual ceremonies and a place of worship.

==== Great kiva ====
Great kivas are larger, deeper, and distinct from Chaco-style kivas, with walls extending above the landscape, while Chaco-style kivas remain flush with it. Unlike Chaco-style kivas, which are incorporated into great houses, great kivas are separate, often feature encircling benches, and include floor vaults likely used as foot drums for ceremonies.

=== Katsina dance ===
Religious ceremonies of the Pueblo religion usually feature traditional and sacred dances. the dancers are called "Katsinam dancers". they are held outdoors in the large common areas and courtyards, which are accompanied by singing and drumming. Unlike kiva ceremonies, traditional dances may be open to non-Puebloans. Traditional dances are considered a form of prayer, and strict rules of conduct apply to those who wish to attend one (e.g. no clapping or walking across the dance area or between the dancers, singers, or drummers). Katsina dances are practiced exclusively by the Pueblo people of the southwestern United States, who currently live in around 25 villages across Arizona and New Mexico, divided into linguistic groups such as Zuni, Keres, Towa, Tewa, Tiwa, and historically, Tompiro and Piro.
