= Jemez language =

Tanoan language

Jemez
- Towa
- Native to: United States
- Region: New Mexico
- Ethnicity: Jemez Pueblo
- Native speakers: 1,800 (2007)
- Language family: Tanoan: Jemez

Language codes
- ISO 639-3: tow
- Glottolog: jeme1245
- ELP: Jemez
- Linguasphere: 64-CBA-a
- Towa language distribution in the State of New Mexico

- Jemez is classified as Vulnerable by the UNESCO Atlas of the World's Languages in Danger

Jemez or Hemish (also Towa) is a Kiowa-Tanoan language spoken by the Jemez Pueblo people in New Mexico. It has no common written form, as tribal rules do not allow the language to be transcribed; linguists describing the language have used the Americanist phonetic notation with slight modifications.

== Origins ==
Towa is a member of the Kiowa-Tanoan language family, which is hypothesized to have originated in the Colorado Plateau. Within Kiowa-Tanoan, Towa is often taken to have diverged after Kiowa but before Tewa and Tiwa. Nonetheless, it shares certain innovations with Kiowa, suggesting a level of contact during their divergence.

The presence of the phoneme /tʲ/ and the inverse suffix -š within Towa, neither of which occur in other Kiowa-Tanoan languages, have been proposed to be innovations drawn from the Keresan languages, where similar forms exist.

== Demographics ==
Towa speakers are mainly farmers and craftsmen. The language is only spoken in Jemez Pueblo, New Mexico, but as 90% of the tribal Jemez members do speak it, it is not considered to be extremely endangered.

Towa may have also spoken at Pecos Pueblo until the 19th century, when the remaining members of that community moved to Jemez, but the scant corpus of the Pecos language renders this uncertain, as does as a range of non-linguistic evidence suggesting a link between the Pecos and the southern Tewa.

== Phonology ==
=== Consonants ===
The segments which have a limited distribution and are derived by some phonological rule are enclosed in parentheses in the table. Except for [t͡ʃʰ], they do not occur word-initially. The following are surface realizations.

		Bilabial	Labio- dental	Alveolar		Post- alveolar	Velar			Glottal
		Bilabial	Labio- dental	median	lateral	Post- alveolar	palatal	plain	labial	Glottal
Plosive/ Affricate	tenuis	p		t		tʲ			kʷ	ʔ
Plosive/ Affricate	aspirated			(tʰ)		(t͡ʃʰ)	kʲʰ	kʰ		
Plosive/ Affricate	ejective	pʼ		tʼ		(t͡ʃʼ)	kʲʼ	kʼ		
Plosive/ Affricate	voiced	b		d		(d͡ʒ)	ɡʲ	ɡ		
Fricative	voiceless	ɸ	f	s	(ɬ)	ʃ				h
Fricative	voiced		v	z						ɦ
Nasal/ Approximant	plain	m		n	l		j		w	
Nasal/ Approximant	glottalic	(ˀm)		(ˀn)	(ˀl)		(ˀj)		(ˀw)	
Tap				ɾ						

- /f ɾ/ occur only in loanwords, the latter only in Spanish loanwords.
- Some speakers affricate /tʲ/ before /i/, e.g. [t͡ʃísælæ] 'lizard'.
- /ɸ/ is usually labialized, thus phonetically [ɸʷ].
- /s z/ have the non-sibilant variants [θ ð]]. Their distributions are not clear.
  - People of younger generations tend to debuccalize the initial /s/ of syllables carrying low tone to [h].
- /l/ occurs word-initially only in Spanish loanwords.

The following are underlying phonemes.

		Bilabial	Labio- dental	Alveolar	Post- alveolar	Velar			Glottal
		Bilabial	Labio- dental	Alveolar	Post- alveolar	palatal	plain	labial	Glottal
Plosive/ Affricate	tenuis	p		t	tʲ			kʷ	ʔ
Plosive/ Affricate	aspirated				t͡ʃʰ	kʲʰ	kʰ		
Plosive/ Affricate	ejective	pʼ		tʼ		kʲʼ	kʼ		
Plosive/ Affricate	voiced	b		d		ɡʲ	ɡ		
Fricative	voiceless	ɸ	f	s	ʃ				h
Fricative	voiced		v	z					ɦ
Nasal		m		n					
Approximant				l		j		w	
Tap				ɾ					

- [t͡ʃʰ] occurs word-initially in some loanwords, e.g. [t͡ʃʰivɑ̂ːtɨ] 'billy goat'; [t͡ʃʰíːnɨ̃́] 'Chinese, curly', so it is included as /t͡ʃʰ/ in the underlying consonant inventory.

=== Vowels ===
Jemez vowels are distinguished according to tongue position (front-back, close-mid-open), length (short-long), and nasality (oral-nasal). There are twenty-two vowels: six short oral, six long oral, five short nasalized, and five long nasalized vowels.

Short vowels
	Front		Back	
	oral	nasal	oral	nasal
Close	i	ĩ	ɨ	ɨ̃
Mid	e		o	õ
Open	æ	æ̃	ɑ	ɑ̃

Long vowels
	Front		Back	
	oral	nasal	oral	nasal
Close	iː	ĩː	ɨː	ɨ̃ː
Mid	eː		oː	õː
Open	æː	æ̃ː	ɑː	ɑ̃ː

- /ɨ/ is realized as [u] after /ɸ w/.
- /ɑ/ has two principal variants, rounded [ɒ] and unrounded [ɑ]. Although the former is more common, their distribution is not clear.
- Length is only contrastive in the first syllable of a word and other syllables' vowels are measurably shorter

=== Tone ===
Jemez has four tones: High, Falling, Mid, and Low. Word-initial syllables only have high or falling tone; other syllables have mid or low tones (though some syllables that follow a high tone also have high tone). Typically tri-syllablic words have tone patterns such as HHL, HML, HLM, HLL, and FLM.

Some loanwords do break these rules however, such as the Spanish loans for coffee, horse, and orange. These words have a high tone and contrastive vowel length in the second syllable, while the first syllable carries low tone.

Jemez high tones typically have a slight rise at the end. Voiced consonants tend to lower the onset of pitch in high tones. If there are several high tones in a row, the pitch also tends to rise throughout. Falling tones fall from the level of high to mid pitch.

For compound nouns or verbs with noun incorporation, the second element loses its word-initial prominence: high tone becomes mid or low tone and vowel length distinction is lost.

=== Phonotactics ===
Jemez allows for the following syllable structures: V, VV, CV, CVV, CVC, CVVC. Of these, CV and CVV are the most common.

== Morphology ==
=== Verbs ===
In Jemez the makeup of verbs is:

Prefix complex – incorporated adverb – incorporated noun – verb stem – tense marker – subordinating particle.

The following example is one where all possible components in a verb are present.

ų-nópenǫʔǫ níí hhéda u-wóó-kæ̨nʔu-haasæ-hųųl-ʔe.
1sD-know 1S NEG 1S-really-dog-bite(PASS)-FUT-NZ
I know that I will not be bitten by a dog.

The only case in which the rule of a verb having to have a prefix and verb stem does not apply is in the case of negative imperatives where the verbal stem is not present. The prefix in Jemez is more than just an agreement system. The prefix functions the same as an independent pronoun and with it, a verb is a full sentence. The prefix in Jemez can agree with up to three nominals. The detailed explanation for how this prefix agreement system works was to complicated for me to understand. What I did take from it is that basically it all boils down to the class of the noun, whether it is singular, dual, or plural and to what kind of sentence it is, whether it is transitive, or intransitive. Another additional factor is if there is possession. These factors will then decide what prefix will be used.

=== Verb types ===
There are four types of verbs in Jemez. These are categorized by two different factors, transitivity and stativity. To be transitive a verb must have both an active and passive form, which means that it can take the transitive prefix or the intransitive prefix, depending on if it is being used in an active sentence or a passive. Verbs that are classified as intransitive do not have passive forms and occur with only an intransitive prefix.

Following this division into transitive and intransitive there is a further division in these classes based on stativity. This divides them into active and stative verbs. Active verbs are found to have multiple different inflections, for example, perfective and imperfective, different from stative verbs, which have only one. The four categories are: transitive active, transitive stative, intransitive active, and intransitive stative.

=== Nouns ===
Jemez nouns use an elaborate number-based noun class system and take on inflectional suffixes. Adnominal demonstratives cue the number and class of nouns.

Noun stems are made up of a single root, a root and a suffix, or more than one root. In general, a noun stem will contain from one to three syllables; out of these disyllabic are most common. The majority of noun roots can occur freely, though there are some noun roots that are bound.

There are three main methods by which nouns are derived from verbs: tone change, suffixation, and compounding. While the first two are fairly straightforward, the latter appears in different forms, such as noun+verb or noun+noun. The compounds consisting of noun and verb can be either noun+verb or verb+noun. A more complex compounding pattern occurs in some words such as outdoor oven, [[bread+bake]+enclosure] or [[noun+verb]+noun].

The languages of the Tanoan family have three grammatical numbers – singular, dual, and plural – and exhibit an unusual system of marking number, in which an inverse number (or number toggling) is coded when it occurs in a non-prototypical quantity. In this scheme, every countable noun has what might be called its "inherent" number, and is unmarked for these. When a noun appears in an "inverse" (atypical) number, it is inflected to mark this. Therefore, Jemez nouns take the ending -sh to denote an inverse number; there are four noun classes which inflect for number using the suffix -sh as follows:

Occurrence of number suffix based on noun class
class	description	singular	dual	plural
I	animate nouns	no	yes	yes
II	some inanimate nouns	yes	yes	no
III	other inanimate nouns	no	yes	no
IV	mass (non-countable) nouns	no	no	no

Class-I nouns are inherently singular, class-II nouns are inherently plural, and class-III nouns are only marked if they occur in twos. Class-IV nouns refer to mass nouns and never occur with -sh.* The table below gives examples the distribution of the -sh suffix and illustrates how it indexes noun class membership in Jemez.

Class	Singular	Dual	Plural	English
I	tyó	tyósh	tyósh	“girl(s)”
I	séé	séésh	séésh	“eagle(s)”
I	wǫ̂ǫ̂hǫ	wǫ̂ǫ̂hǫsh	wǫ̂ǫ̂hǫsh	“star(s)”
II	hhúsh	hhúsh	hhú	“cedar(s)”
II	hwúúyʔash	hwúúyʔash	hwúúyʔa	“weed(s)”
II	tââsash	tââsash	tââsa	“cup(s)”
III	pá	pásh	pá	“flower(s)”
III	dééhede	dééhedesh	dééhede	“'shirt(s)”
III	tį̂į̂nįtà	tį̂į̂nįtàsh	tį̂į̂nįtà	“pillow”
IV	ʔǫ̂ǫ̂ʔe	-		“sugar”
IV	p’æ̂	-		"water"
IV	aró	-		“rice”

=== Adjectives ===
Jemez adjectives behave differently from English or other European languages. In the Jemez language stative verbs signal the function of adjectives in European languages, whereas there is also a smaller group of words termed “noun adjectives". This smaller group of words are syntactically nouns in that they take number suffixes but function semantically as adjectives. These noun adjectives can, like other nouns in Jemez, take the inverse marker, and they can also compound with other nouns, another typical characteristic for Jemez nouns. Examples of words in this noun adjective category are the words meaning big, small, blind, and old.

=== Pronouns ===
Jemez is a pro-drop language, meaning that independent pronouns are often absent in clauses. However, there is usually no ambiguity in meaning since the arguments of the verb are encoded by the pronominal prefixes attached to it. Independent pronouns in Jemez index two grammatical persons (1st, and 2nd) and two numbers (singular, and dual/plural), and two clusivity categories for first person dual-plural, namely inclusive ("You and me/us") and exclusive ("Us but not you"). There are no separate words for third person pronouns, although demonstratives (dôôtæ̨ “that” and nį́į́t’æsh “those”) can fulfil that function.

	Singular	Dual-Plural	
	Singular	Inclusive	Exclusive
First	nį́į́	nį́į́(sh)	ʔɨ̨́ɨ̨́(sh)
Second	ʔɨ̨́wą́	ʔɨ̨́mįsh	
Third	dôôtæ̨	nį́į́t’æsh	

Robert Sprout observed that speakers may omit /-sh/ from first person dual-plural, making it is possible to use nį́į́ for dual or plural. The inclusive first person plural is forms are ʔɨ̨́ɨ̨́ and ʔɨ̨́ɨ̨́sh, the latter being reported as being probably viewed as more formal though both were heard.

==== Exclusive vs. inclusive ====
The inclusive and exclusive are used to show the relationship between the two speakers, in relation to the topic at hand. The inclusive would put the speaker and his interlocutor, or person being spoken to in the same group, or something that is sometimes known as "in-group". And so conversely if using the exclusive, it shows that they are an outsider. An example illustrating this given by Robert Sprott in his doctoral dissertation is if there are two men speak Jemez fluently, one a Jemez man and the other a person who is Anglo, but also speaks Jemez. In this case if the man was talking about a broad subject, like the problems humanity faces, the group would be every human being, so in this case the inclusive "ʔų́ų́sh" would be used since they both belong to the same group. Continuing with this example, if one changes the topic to the problems faced by members pertaining to Native Americans or even more specific, members of just the Jemez nation, then the Jemez man would use "nį́į́sh", because they would no longer be members of the same group.

While it does show the relationship of the speaker to the person being spoken to the, it is not simply used to express an already defined relationships, but can also be used to express changes in this relationship, depending on how the speaker is perceiving or wants the relationship to be perceived by the person who he is speaking to as well as other people. Continuing with the example given by Sprott, if the Jemez man wished to insist that the Anglo was not an outsider to the Jemez then he might use the inclusive "ʔų́ų́sh". Also if this man was being taught how to be Jemez, then in that case "ʔų́ų́sh" would carry the additional meaning of an exhortation to meet the expectations held. In this case it shows how the choice in pronoun can be used to show unity, and the opposite can also be true. The example given is: “Say I'm on a baseball team and we have a game. One of our good players doesn't show up for the game, but we play without him and we win anyway. Later I run into him and he asks me about the game, “Did we (“ʔų́ų́sh”) win?” I say to him, “Yeah, we (“nį́į́sh”) won,” and that cuts him out and puts him down.”

== Determiners ==
Determiners in Jemez can function as personal pronouns, demonstratives or noun modifiers. The behave similarly to nouns in that they can take on the inverse number marker. Further more when acting as independent pronouns they take the same class as what they are referring to.

Determiners in the Jemez language are broken down into three groups. The divisions among these groups are distinguished by the meaning they show in relation to space of the speaker with the noun accompanying the determiner.

The first class of determiner is one that is only used with nouns that are in sight and easily accessible to the speaker, this accessibility seems to be directly related to effort that must be put in to reach the noun and distance to the speaker. The determiner used is dependent on the form of the noun. Determiners that are used when in plain noun form are: “nų́ų́”, “nų́ų́dæ”, “nų́ų́tʔæ” and “hhnų́”. The determiners applied to nouns in the inverse forms are: “nų́ų́dæsh” and “nų́ų́tʔæsh”. Breaking the determiners into another division is possible based on usage, determiners nų́ų́dæ” and “nų́ų́dæsh” tend to be used when the determiner is followed by a noun. When it is not, instead playing the rule of an independent pronoun, in that case being the noun phrase, then “nų́ų́ʔtæ” “nų́ų́ʔtæsh” are a possibility, along with “nų́ų́dæ” and “nų́ų́dæsh”. It is important to make note that there is differences between speakers.

When a determiner combines with a noun there are different rules depending on the class of the noun, these rules explain under what situations what will or can take the inverse suffix, whether it will be the determiner, noun, or both. For Class I nouns, there is an overall tendency or “rule” that the noun has to take this inverse suffix. That is the only requirement for it to be acceptable; it is possible to have two inverse suffixes, one on the determiner and one on the noun. The only scenario not acceptable being that where the noun did not have this inverse suffix but the determiner did.

- nų́ų́dæsh véélesh 'these men'
- nų́ų́dæ véélesh 'these men'
- *nų́ų́dæsh vééle - not acceptable

This is not applicable to Class II or Class III nouns. For these two classes the pattern is different, the insistence of the noun having to take an inverse suffix is gone and instead we see that as long as either the determiner or the noun takes an inverse it is fine, but if both take the –sh inverse suffix, it is reported as being “too much”.

The second type of determiner category we to only have one determiner, “nǽ̨ǽ̨”. This determiner is used to show that the noun is in sight of the speaker but “not really accessible to him.” (sprott) This determiner though used to show this meaning is not used every time that this is the special relation between noun and speaker because its usage is limited to only nouns in the basic form. When it is the case that the noun is in its inverse form than “nǽ̨ǽ̨” is replaced with “nų́ų́dæsh”. The determiner “nǽ̨ǽ̨” can, like other determiners, also be used as an independent pronoun, though there is a slight change; instead of “nǽ̨ǽ̨” it becomes “nǽ̨ʔǽ̨”, something like this also having been observed to happen in the first determiner category.

The third category of determiners shows a relation between speaker and noun where it is not about distance but instead line of sight, these determiners being used when the noun is out of sight regardless of distance. The three determiners belonging to this category are “doo”, “dosh” and “ʔoo”. Again, as in the other two determiner categories there is a distinction between when used as an independent pronoun or a determiner. For “doo” and “dosh” the independent pronoun form is “doʔo” and “doʔsh”, but for “ʔoo” this is not the case as it is an exception among all the determiners that is not used a pronoun. Besides it not being used as a pronoun, “ʔoo” also has the special characteristic of only being used with animate objects, mainly human, as Sprott says “it can sometimes be applied to non-human animates, but with a great deal of hesitation and some reluctance”. Another restriction that is pointed out by a speaker mentioned as one of Sprott's Jemez teachers is that they feel that the pronoun would not be used when mentioning the person for the first time, only after you have already mentioned them could you use it.

== Revitalization ==
In 2006, the leadership of Pueblo of Jemez noticed a language shift and established a ten-person team of speakers, elders, and educators to study language use and develop strategies for language revival. Through interviews, the tribe determined the fluency rate was 80% among tribal members. The Jemez Language Program developed an early childhood immersion program and Jemez language curriculum for kindergarten through 8th grade. They also hosted Jemez Education Retreats.

== Bibliography ==
- Bell, Alan; Heins, Rebecca (1993). "Phonetics of Jemez vowels". The Journal of the Acoustical Society of America. 93 (4): 2297. Bibcode:1993ASAJ...93.2297B. doi:10.1121/1.406479. ISSN 0001-4966.
- Bell, Alan (1993a). "Jemez tones and stress" (PDF). Colorado Research in Linguistics. 12. University of Colorado at Boulder: 26–34. Archived from the original on March 27, 2014.
- Deutscher, Guy (2005). The Unfolding of Language: An Evolutionary Tour of Mankind's Greatest Invention. New York: Henry Holt and Company. p. 43. ISBN 978-0-8050-7907-4.
- Hale, Kenneth L. (1955–1956). "Notes on Jemez Grammar" (Manuscript). Unpublished manuscript.
- Martin, Constance C. (1966). Jemez Phonology (MA thesis). University of New Mexico.
- Mithun, Marianne (1999). The Languages of Native North America. Cambridge: Cambridge University Press. pp. 81, 443. ISBN 978-0-521-23228-9.
- Ortman, Scott G. (2012). Winds from the North: Tewa Origins and Historical Anthropology. University of Utah Press. ISBN 9781607819929.
- Pueblo of Jemez (2014a). "History of the Jemez Pueblo". Archived from the original on February 1, 2022.
- Pueblo of Jemez (2014b). "Jemez Towa Language Program". Archived from the original on March 6, 2014.
- Sprott, Robert (1992). Jemez Syntax (PhD thesis). University of Chicago.
- Yumitani, Yukihiro (1998). A Phonology and Morphology of Jemez Towa (PhD thesis). University of Kansas. ISBN 978-0-599-00378-1. ProQuest 304421663.
