= Archuleta =

Origin
- Meaning: derived from Basque Aretxuloeta meaning "wide place where oak trees grow"
- Region of origin: Spain

Other names
- Variant forms: Arecha, Arechaga, Arechiga, Arechavala, Arechuleta, Areche, Arechea, Arechu

Archuleta is a unique family name with origins in Spain. The surname ranked 2,762 out of 88,799 in the United States.

== Origin ==
The name Archuleta is a Castilian derivation of Basque Arechuleta, which ultimately comes from the place name Arechavaleta (Basque: Aretxabaleta). The placename uses the Basque words "(h)aritz" (oak tree), "zabal" (wide) and "eta" (indicating plurality), with the combined meaning of "wide place where oak trees grow." It is unknown why the "e" in Arechuleta was ultimately dropped. The family lineage can be traced all the way back to Queen Isabella of Spain.

== Family crest ==
Institute of heraldry diccionario heráldico de apellidos españoles by Juan de Atienza 1546-?
On a base an oak tree vert (Continuous growth and fertility)	The surname Archuleta as shown in the Diccionârio Onomastico y Heraldico Vasco (Basque heraldry dictionary) means oak grove (p-11a, Letter from the drawn University of Nevada, Reno). In Heraldry the leaves are drawn as of huge dimensions in relation to the entire tree. An Oak tree will have a dozen or twenty leaves only to make up the whole "head". In this way the shape of the left is an invisible indicate the nature of the tree. 'Vert' means that the Oak tree is standing on a mount.
at foot of truck a wild boar, mouth open (Bravery; fights to the death)	At the foot of the oak, there is a boar standing in front of the trunk of the tree. The boar has tusks protruding from the lower jaw, mouth open in a fighting position and tail terminating in a tuff
in each blank a horse rampant Readiness for all employments for king and country)	On each side of the oak, floating in mid-air, a horse. Horses are expected in heraldry for obvious
reguardant all proper	If the horse turn his head to face out of the shield, he is rampant gardant (note there is no 'u' in the word); he is not on guard, but simply looking. With his head turned completely around so as to gaze over his shoulder to the sinister he is regardant
in a bordure azure (Truth and loyalty)	The border of the shield is painted sky blue
four mullets or (Divine quality from above; mark of third son)	These are five or six pointed stars that stand for four events or noteworthy accomplishments
Note the yellow or gold background denotes (Generosity and elevation of the mind)
"500 years of the Archuleta" by Harry M. Archuleta TXu001598502 / 2007-11-05	Comment: There are a number of heraldry mills, who did not do their research correctly. If they had done their research correctly, they would have seen that the name means "wide place where oak trees grow", so an oak tree had to be a part of the crest.

== People with the surname ==
- Adam Archuleta (born 1977), American football player
- Antonio D. Archuleta (1855–1918), American politician from Colorado and namesake of Archuleta County, Colorado
- Bob Archuleta (born 1945), American politician from California
- David Archuleta (born 1990), American singer
- Diego Archuleta (1814–1884), politician and soldier from Mexico and the New Mexico Territory
- Eppie Archuleta (1922–2014), American weaver
- Felipe Archuleta (1910–1991), American folk artist
- Frankie Archuleta (born 1975), American professional boxer
- Juan Archuleta (born 1987), American mixed martial artist
- Katherine Archuleta (born c. 1949), American political appointee
- Lena Lovato Archuleta (1920–2011), American educator and school administrator
- Margaret Archuleta (1950–2023), Pueblo-American curator
- Moses Archuleta (fl. 2000s–present), American musician
- Phillip Archuleta (1949–2014), American politician from New Mexico
- Trinidad Archuleta (1905–1981), Pueblo-American painter

== Places with the name "Archuleta" ==
- Archuleta County, Colorado
- Archuleta Mesa
