= DeAnna Autumn Leaf Suazo =

American painter

DeAnna Autumn Leaf Suazo (1992–2021) was an American painter from New Mexico.

== Early life ==
Suazo grew up on the tribal lands of the Taos Pueblo. Suazo's mother was the Navajo (Dine) artist Geraldine Tso, and her father was the Taos Pueblo painter David Gary Suazo.

== Art ==
In the spring of 2021, Suazo graduated from the Institute of American Indian Arts (IAIA) with a BFA in Studio Arts.

After her death, the IAIA posted online that her art "reflected Pueblo cultural significance and aesthetics. Inspired by heroic figures of Japanese manga novels including 'Sailor Moon,' she imbued her work with memory, resilience, and good intentions. Her most recent work emphasized figural paintings of strong Indigenous women that in her words 'grind every day for a better community.'"

She often drew on traditional ledger paper, and worked with Prismacolor Marker, Indian Black Ink, and acrylic paint.

== Death and legacy ==
On November 13, 2021, Suazo was found dead near her car outside her home in the Taos Pueblo. Her boyfriend, Santiago Martinez, also from the Taos Pueblo, was later charged with second-degree homicide.

At the time of her death, Suazo was working on a master's degree at the Institute of American Indian Arts in Santa Fe. In 2022, the IAIA announced the DeAnna Autumn Leaf Suazo Memorial Fund for Indigenous female artists in school's MFA in Studio Arts Program.

In the spring of 2023, muralist Jenny Ustick featured Suazo's image as part of a mural on the campus of the University of New Mexico-Taos. According to a press release, the other people featured as part of the Historical Women of Taos mural included "María Rosa Villalpando, ancestral matriarch of several prominent Taos families and one of the historic women of the Santa Fe Trail; Cleofas Martinez Jaramillo, historic preservationist of northern New Mexico's Spanish culture; and Helene Wurlitzer, philanthropist who started a pivotal artist residency in Taos."
