= Captives in American Indian Wars =

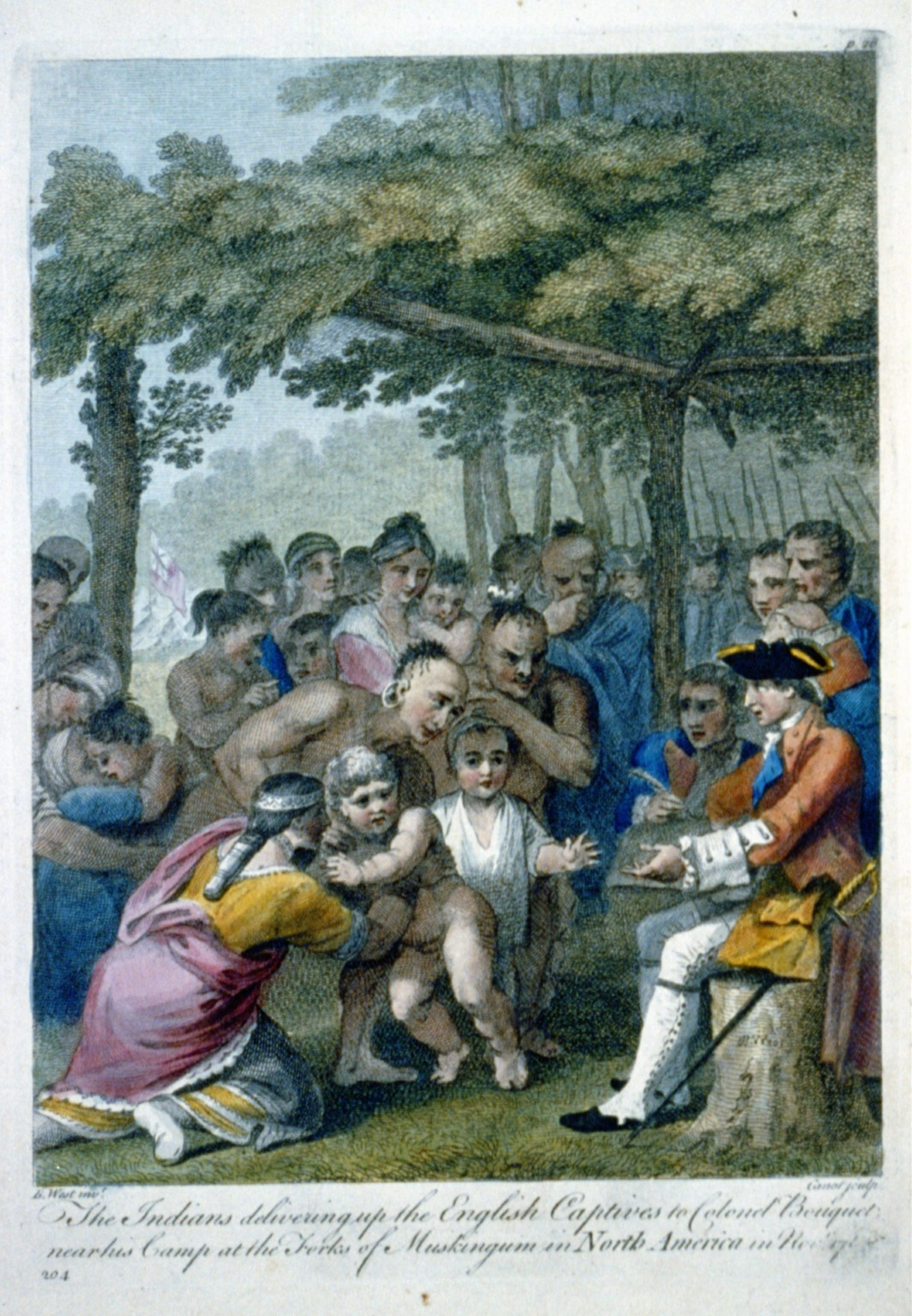
An engraving depicting Native Americans returning captured white colonists to their families under the direction of Henry Bouquet upon the conclusion of Pontiac's War.

Captives in American Indian Wars could expect to be treated differently depending on the identity of their captors and the conflict they were involved in. During the American Indian Wars, indigenous peoples and European colonists alike frequently became captives of hostile parties. Depending on the specific instances in which they were captured, they could either be held as prisoners of war, abducted as a means of hostage diplomacy, used as countervalue targets, enslaved, or apprehended for purposes of criminal justice.

== History ==
=== Cultural background ===
Treatment applied to European captives taken in wars or raids in North America varied according to the culture of each tribe. Before European colonization, the indigenous peoples of the Americas had developed customs for dealing with captives. Depending on the region, captives could either be killed, tortured, kept alive and assimilated into the tribe, or enslaved. When indigenous tribes came into contact with European settlers, they applied longstanding customary traditions for dealing with indigenous captives to the white colonists. Conflicts between indigenous tribes and European settlers resulted in captives being taken on both sides; while the westward expansion of the United States and subsequent conflicts with Native Americans also resulted in many white and Indian captives being taken. Captivity narratives were often written by European-Americans and European-Canadians who were ransomed or escaped from captivity.

=== King Philip's War ===
In King Philip's War, a three-year conflict between indigenous peoples of New England and New England colonists, captured Native Americans were frequently sold into slavery in the West Indies by the colonists. Many friendly Native Americans were enslaved and sent to the West Indies as well.

=== Cultural differences ===
Contrary to depictions in media, the Indigenous peoples of North America did not generally torture captives to death ritualistically; in fact, according to American historian and anthropologist Frederick Webb Hodge not only was human sacrifice rarer in North America than in the rest of the world, even the ritualistic sacrifice of animals was infrequent:

Still more potent means of influencing the powers are offerings and sacrifices. On the whole, these are not so strongly developed in North America as they are in other parts of the world. In many regions human sacrifices were common—for instance, in Mexico and Yucatan—while in northern America they are known only in rare instances, as among the Pawnee. However, many cases of torture, particularly of self-torture, must be reckoned here (see Ordeals, Sun Dance). Other bloody sacrifices are also rare in North America. We may mention the sacrifice of the dog among the Iroquois. Only to a limited extent do we find the tendency of considering the killing of game as a bloody sacrifice. On the other hand, sacrifices of tobacco smoke, of corn, and of parts of food, of small manufactured objects, and of symbolic objects, are very common. These gifts may be offered to any of the supernatural powers with the intent of gaining their assistance and avoiding their enmity.

In contrast to the Eastern Woodlands tribes, peoples of the Northwest Coast (encompassing the coastal regions of Oregon, Washington, British Columbia, and southeastern Alaska), enslaved war captives. Slaves were traded and were a valuable commodity. More importantly, enslaved captives were given as gifts during a potlatch ceremony to enhance the prestige of the gift giver. Some scholars believe that slaves performed major economic roles in this region and comprised a permanent social class and a significant proportion of the population, though this has proved to be controversial.

=== Pontiac's War ===
Henry Bouquet set out from Fort Pitt on October 3, 1764, with 1,150 men during the chaos of Pontiac's War. After that, treaties were negotiated at Fort Niagara and Fort Detroit; the Ohio Natives were isolated and, with some exceptions, ready to make peace. In a council which began on 17 October, Bouquet demanded that the Ohio Natives return all captives, including those not yet returned from the French and Indian War. Guyasuta and other leaders reluctantly handed over more than 200 captives, many of whom had been adopted into Native families. Because not all of the captives were present that day, the Natives were compelled to surrender hostages as a guarantee that the other captives would be returned. The Ohio Natives agreed to attend a more formal peace conference with William Johnson, the Superintendent of Indian Affairs, which was finalized in July 1765.

== See also ==
- Maria Rosa Villalpando, Hispanic woman, captive of the Comanche and Pawnee.
- Prisoner of war
