= Ochwiay Biano =

Taos Pueblo elder

Antonio Mirabal (Mountain Lake or Ochwiay Biano) was an elder and political leader of Taos Pueblo in New Mexico.

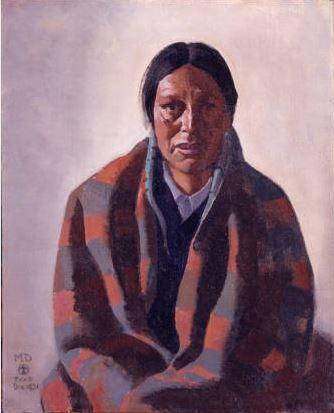
Portrait of Antonio Maribal by Maynard Dixon, 1931

== Background ==
Mirabal was described as the "leading intellectual" of the Taos Pueblo by anthropologist Elsie Clews Parsons following her visits to the pueblo in the 1920s and 1930s. Parsons identified Maribal's Tiwa Language name as Paw'iapianu.

=== Notable Relationships ===
Mirabal was friends with Taos artist and activist Mabel Dodge Luhan, writer D. H. Lawrence, and Professor Jaime de Angulo. In 1931 his portrait was painted by Maynard Dixon.

== Meeting with Carl Jung ==
In December 1925, Mirabal was introduced to C. G. Jung by de Angulo. In writings describing their meetings, Jung referred to Maribal using what he believed to be his Tiwa Language name (Ochwiay Biano) and its approximate English translation (Mountain Lake), though some scholarship has cast doubt on the accuracy of both names.

In his book Memories, Dreams, Reflections, Jung recalls a conversation he had with Mirabal, which Jung reported as follows:

"How cruel the whites are: their lips are thin, their noses sharp, their faces furrowed and distorted by holes. Their eyes have a staring expression. They are always seeking something. What are they seeking? The whites always want something, they are always uneasy and restless. We do not know what they want, we do not understand them, we think that they are mad." I asked him why he thought the whites were all mad. "They say they think with their heads", he replied.

"Why, of course. What do you think with?" I asked him in surprise.

"We think here", he said, indicating his heart.

Later in Jung's visit, Mirabal taught Jung that his people, like the Elongyi tribe of Kenya, rose in the morning and spit in their palms, thereby presenting their soul-stuff to the sun to welcome it in an expression of sympathetic magic.

== Political Leadership and Activism ==
Mirabal became a prominent political leader and activist in the Taos Pueblo in the 1920s and 1930s. Mirabal rejected a proposed meeting with President Herbert Hoover, choosing instead to travel to New York in January 1933 to meet with then president-elect Franklin D. Roosevelt. Mirabal advocated to Roosevelt for the welfare of the pueblos and for the passage of the subsequent Pueblo Relief Bill. In the 1940s Mirabal served as Governor of the Taos Pueblo.

== Later life ==
Mirabal continued to live in the Taos pueblo until his death in February 1976.

== Works cited ==
- Barton, David. "C.G. Jung in Taos: A Creative Mis-Encounter". Beezone Library.
- Crowley, Vivianne (1999). Jung: A Journey of Transformation: Exploring His Life and Experiencing His Ideas. Quest Books. ISBN 978-0835607827.
- Hollis, James (2002). The Archetypal Imagination. Texas A&M University Press. ISBN 978-1585442683.
- Park, Karilee (4 May 2023). "Maynard Dixon: No Place Like Home". Utah Art Magazine. 15 Bytes.
- Parsons, Elise Clews (1936). "Taos Pueblo". General Series in Anthropology. 2: 5–121.
- Young, Willow (2020). "The Lineage of an Enduring Friendship between Carl Jung and Ochiway Biano" (PDF). Psychological Perspectives. 63 (3–4): 441–457. doi:10.1080/00332925.2020.1898853.
- "Pueblo Indians Ask Roosevelt for a Friendly Chief Official". Albuquerque Journal. Albuquerque, New Mexico. Associated Press. 11 January 1933. p. 1. Archived from the original on 20 January 2024 – via Newspapers.com.
- "Taos Governor Mixup Throws About Everybody in Dither". Santa Fe New Mexican. Santa Fe, New Mexico. Associated Press. 27 September 1948. p. 9. Archived from the original on 20 January 2024 – via Newspapers.com.
