= Antonio Archuleta =

American painter

- Occupation: painter

"Indians on Horseback," watercolor on paper, before 1933

Antonio Archuleta was a Pueblo-American painter from the Taos Pueblo who was known to be painting before the 1930s. Some of his works are in the permanent collection of institutions including the Museum of New Mexico and the School for Advanced Research. Some of his watercolors depict men riding and hunting on horseback.
