= Maria Rosa Villalpando =

Comanche captive (c. 1738–1830)

María Rosa Villalpando (also María Rosa Villapando, Marie Rose Vildepane, and Marie Rose Sale dit Lajoie), born c. 1738, Taos, New Mexico; died July 27, 1830, St. Louis, Missouri, was a New Mexican woman captured by the Comanche in 1760. She was sold or traded to the Pawnee where she met and married a French trader named Jean Sale. Sale later returned to France while Villalpando remained in St. Louis. Villalpando's life has been cited by several authors as an example of cultural fusion among the several races and ethnic groups living on the frontier of the southwestern United States in the 18th and 19th centuries.

== Background ==
Maria Rosa Villalpando's parentage and family cannot be determined with any certainty. She was possibly the daughter of Pablo Villalpando and Francisca Lujan, who were of Spanish heritage. Possible also was that she was the daughter of Juan Villalpando (brother of Pablo?) and Maria Valdés. The children of this union were described as "coyotes" which in the complicated caste system of Spanish America was the term used to describe persons of mixed Spanish and Native American (Indian) heritage. Valdés, thus, may have been a genizaro (a detribalized Indian adopted into or a servant in a Spanish family) and her daughter, Maria Rosa, may have been one-half Indian and one-half Spanish. The birthdate of Maria Rosa is likewise uncertain with dates given from 1723 to 1738 by various authorities. 1738 seems the most likely given her death date of 1830. Maria Rosa married Juan Jose Jaques and the couple had at least one child, Joseph Julian Jaques, born about 1758.

In 1760, Maria Rosa was living in the Pablo Villalpando estancia (ranch) near Taos, New Mexico. It is uncertain whether she was living in the Villalpando household as a daughter, a relative, or a servant who had adopted her employer's (or owner's) last name. The population of the Villalpando estancia was 12 to 17 families. The estancia resembled a fortress with observation towers, a chapel with a warning bell, a supply of muskets and ammunition, and probably a corral to herd livestock inside the walls to protect them from theft.

== Comanche raid and capture ==
The Comanches raided the New Mexico settlements frequently with over 100 raids recorded between the 1740s and 1770s. At the same time they were frequent visitors, especially to Taos, to trade with the New Mexicans. In 1760, a fragile peace between the Comanches and the New Mexicans had existed for several years but Taos Pueblo held a scalp dance and displayed several Comanche scalps. The Comanche were furious and on August 4, 1760 a large army of them—contemporary sources say 3,000 but that seems greatly exaggerated—descended upon the Villalpando estancia. The Comanches killed fourteen male defenders and several women and children including Maria Rosa's husband and mother. The Comanche took 56 women and children captive, including Maria Rosa Villalpando. Her two-year-old son was not captured although for more than 40 years she may not have known that he survived.

== Marriage and later life ==
Villalpando was a captive of the Comanche for several years and during that time had a child. She was traded to the Pawnee. While living with the Pawnee, she met the French trader Jean Sale and they lived together. She gave birth to a son by Sale in 1768 who they named Lambert. In 1770, Sale took Maria Rosa, Lambert, and her half-Comanche son, Antoine Xavier, to St. Louis with him. They were married on July 3, 1770. Lambert became a full heir to their estate, but Antoine Xavier was not given any rights of inheritance. The couple had three more children, only one of which (Helene) lived to adulthood. In 1792, Sale returned to France. He took his son Lambert with him, but two years later Lambert returned to St. Louis and lived there for the rest of his life, dying in 1834. Sale never returned.

In 1802, Villalpando had a surprise visitor: her son Joseph Julian Jaques who she had not seen since the Comanche raid of 1760. On August 3, 1803, he signed an agreement with his mother relinquishing any claims to her estate in exchange for a payment of 200 pesos, a substantial sum of money. Her daughter Helene became her sole heir. In 1805 her property in St. Louis was valued at 800 dollars. She died on July 27, 1830, aged about 91 years, at the home of her daughter Helene.

== Legacy ==
Josiah Gregg first brought the story of Villalpando to light in his 1844 book Commerce of the Prairies. Gregg's account, with many inaccuracies, said that she was the ancestor of many respectable families in St. Louis and was remembered for telling "her tale of woe." Historian James F. Brooks, who wrote of "slavery, kinship, and community in the Southwest borderlands," saw Villalpando as an example of the passage of many Hispanics, Anglos, French, and Indians between and among the blended cultures of the Southwest. Museum director Frances Levine saw Villalpando's life as a journey from "captive to creole," which ended with her as a matron and property owner in St. Louis. A historical marker posted near Taos says that her grandson, Antoine Leroux, returned to Taos and married into the Vigil family, "making her the ancestral matriarch of several prominent Taos families."
