= Lena Lovato Archuleta =

American educator, school librarian and administrator

- Born: Lena Lovato; July 25, 1920; Clapham, New Mexico
- Died: April 3, 2011 (aged 90); Denver, Colorado
- Education: B.A. education and M.S. library science, University of Denver
- Occupations: Educator, school librarian, administrator
- Years active: 1942–1979
- Employer: Denver Public Schools
- Spouse: Juan U. Archuleta
- Parent(s): Eusebio and Dominguita Lovato
- Awards: Colorado Women's Hall of Fame (1985)

Lena Lovato Archuleta (July 25, 1920 – April 3, 2011) was an American educator, school librarian, and administrator in New Mexico and Colorado for more than three decades. In 1976 she became the first Hispanic woman principal in the Denver Public Schools system. She was also the first Hispanic president of the Denver Classroom Teachers' Association and the Colorado Library Association, and the first female president of the Latin American Education Foundation. She was instrumental in the founding of several political and community advocacy groups for Latinos and served on numerous city and community boards. Following her retirement in 1979, she became a full-time volunteer for the American Association of Retired Persons (AARP). She was inducted into the Colorado Women's Hall of Fame in 1985. In 2002 the Denver Public Schools system dedicated the Lena L. Archuleta Elementary School in northeast Denver in her honor.

== Early life and education ==
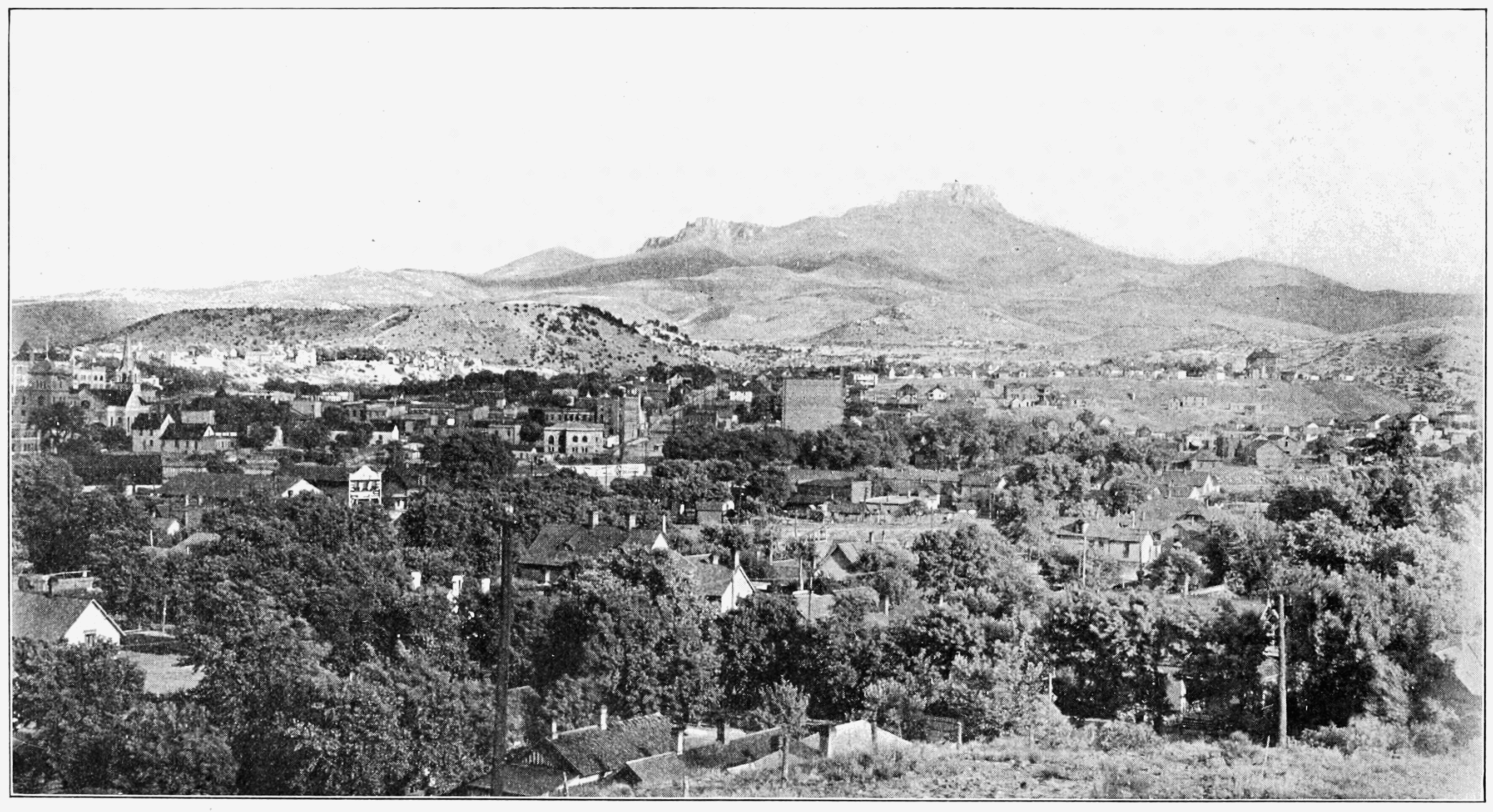
Town of Raton, New Mexico in 1909

Lena Lovato was born in Clapham, New Mexico, to Eusebio Lovato, a shoe repairman and World War I veteran, and his wife Dominguita. She was an eighth-generation Mexican American. She had one sister. In 1922 the family moved to Raton, where she graduated from Raton High School. She obtained a scholarship to the University of Denver, where she majored in Spanish and minored in Latin and education, graduating with a B.A. in education. In 1951 she earned her master's degree in library science at the University of Denver.

== Career ==
In 1942 she began working in the Northern New Mexico Normal School in El Rito, teaching music and Spanish. She married a year later, and in 1951 she and her husband relocated to Denver. Archuleta joined the Denver Public Schools system as a teacher and school librarian at Westwood Elementary School and, in 1953, Kepner Middle School. In the 1960s she began working in administration, becoming the coordinator of the Department of Library Services, supervisor of the Office of Community Relations, and supervisor of Federal bilingual education projects for Denver Public Schools.

In 1976 Archuleta became the first Hispanic woman principal in the Denver Public Schools system with her appointment at Fairview Elementary School. She retired in 1979, the same year as her husband.

Following her retirement from teaching and administration, Archuleta undertook full-time volunteer work. She was active in the American Association of Retired Persons (AARP) as both a member of the board of directors and an advocate, opening an AARP chapter in her own apartment building. To enhance her effectiveness, Archuleta took a public speaking course and thereafter conducted free public forums to educate seniors about their health care options.

== Latino advocacy ==
Archuleta was instrumental in the founding of several Latino advocacy groups. In 1964 she co-founded the Latin American Research and Service Agency (LARASA), a Latino political advocacy and community development organization. In 1976 she was one of the eight founders of the Mi Casa Resource Center for Women, a job training and employment development organization. In 2000 she helped found Circle of Latina Leadership, a leadership training group for Hispanic women in Denver, and mentored many of its participants.

== Affiliations ==
Archuleta was the first Hispanic president of the Denver Classroom Teachers' Association and the Colorado Library Association, and the first female president of the Latin American Education Foundation. She was an advisory council member of the Latino/a Research & Policy Center and a board member of LARASA, Brothers' Redevelopment, Community Colleges and Occupational Education, Circle of Latina Leadership, Rude Park Community Nursery, the Denver Public Library Commission, the Denver Landmark Preservation Commission, and the Denver Planning Board. She was a committee member of the Hospice of Metro Denver and the Denver Catholic Archdiocese finance committee. She served on the board of directors of AARP, and from 1990 to 1996 was the board's vice-president, being the first Hispanic woman to hold that position. She was also president of the Greater Denver Rainbow Chapter of AARP and represented Colorado at the 1995 White House Conference on Aging.

== Awards and honors ==
Archuleta received the Bernie Valdez Community Service Award from LARASA, the Civis Princeps (First Citizen) Citation in Humanitarianism from Regis University, the Hispanic Annual Salute, and the Denver Hispanic Chamber of Commerce "Famous Firsts" Award, among other local honors. She was inducted into the Colorado Women's Hall of Fame in 1985.

In 1999 she received a Distinguished Service Award from the University of Colorado Denver for her contributions to the Hispanic community and senior citizens. In December 2001 Archuleta was honored as one of Denver's "Unsung Heroes" by Mayor Wellington Webb.

In April 2002 the Denver Public Library Association introduced the annual Lena L. Archuleta Community Service Award, with Archuleta being the first recipient. LARASA initiated its annual Lena L. Archuleta Education Service Award in 2004.

In October 2002 the Denver Public Schools system dedicated the Lena L. Archuleta Elementary School in the northeast Denver neighborhood of Montbello in her honor. The school, built at a cost of $10.8 million and educating grades K-5, was the first Denver public school named for a Latina.

In December 2023, the Denver Public Library system dedicated its newest branch as the Lena Archuleta Branch Library in honor of Archuleta's contributions as an educator and leader in service of Denver's Hispanic community.

== Personal ==
She married Juan U. Archuleta in 1943. After their move to Denver in 1951, he worked for the Denver Public Schools system in power and water system maintenance. They were married for 55 years at the time of Juan's death in 1998. They had no children.

In 1999 Archuleta and five other women formed a Spanish-speaking widows support group at Centro San Juan Diego, the Hispanic ministry of the Roman Catholic Archdiocese of Denver. In 2004, the group created an annual awards brunch called the Las Madrinas Tribute, recognizing women who have made significant contributions to the community. An auction held at the brunch has been named the "Lena Archuleta Mercadito" in her memory.

Archuleta's interests included piano playing and dance. She was a member of Las Estrellitas Alegres (The Happy Little Stars) women's Spanish and Mexican dance group in Denver.

The Lena L. Archuleta Papers, covering her career from 1942 to 2010, are housed at the Denver Public Library.
