= Taos Pueblo =

Tiwa Pueblo in New Mexico; oldest U.S. city

Taos Pueblo tə̂otho or tə̂obo ȉałopháymųpʼȍhə́othə̀olbo or ȉałopháybo Pueblo de Taos Pueblo of Taos
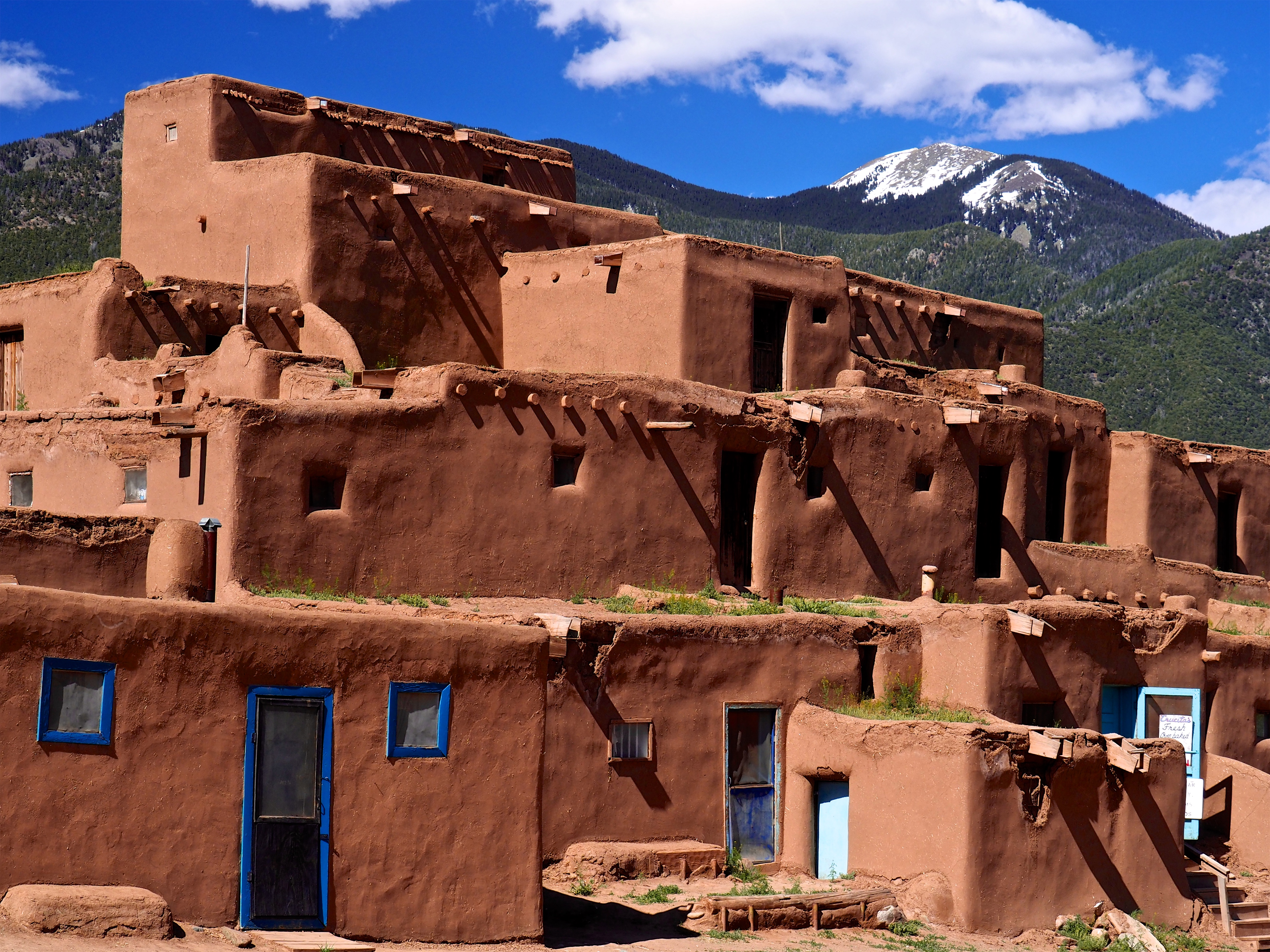
- The oldest building in the United States is this thousand-year old apartment in the Pueblo of Taos, pictured with the snow-capped peak of Maxwaluna in the background.
- Capital: Taos Pueblo; 36°26′21″N 105°32′44″W
- Other languages: Taos Tiwa, English, Spanish
- Government: Republic
  - Governor: Mike Martinez
  - Lt. Governor: Delbert Chisholm
  - Tribal Secretary: Cameron Martinez
  - War Chief: Curtis Sandoval
  - Tribal Sheriff: Gabriel Romero; Shaunte Bernal
- Legislature: Pueblo of Taos Tribal Council

Establishment
  - Tiwa people move into the Taos valley: c. 900
  - Initial construction of Taos Pueblo: c. 1000
  - Pueblo Revolt: 1680
  - Pueblo Republic: 1680-1692
  - Treaties with the Comanche: 1785-1786
  - Mexican Independence: 1821
  - Rio Arriba County, New Mexico: 1837
  - Taos Revolt: 1847
  - United States v. Sandoval: 1913
  - Return of Blue Lake: 1970

Taos Pueblo
- Location within New Mexico Location within United States
- Location: Taos Pueblo, New Mexico, U.S.

Site notes
- Governing body: Native American tribal government

UNESCO World Heritage Site
- Official name: Pueblo de Taos
- Type: Cultural
- Criteria: iv
- Designated: 1992 (16th session)
- Reference no.: 492
- Region: Europe and North America

U.S. National Register of Historic Places
- Designated: October 15, 1966
- Reference no.: 66000496
- Area: 19 acres (7.7 ha)
- Architecture: Pueblo

U.S. National Historic Landmark District
- Designated: October 9, 1960

NM State Register of Cultural Properties
- Designated: March 13, 1972
- Reference no.: 243

Taos
t’óynemą

Total population
- 4,500 (2010 U.S. census)

Regions with significant populations
- United States (New Mexico)

Languages
- Taos (Tiwa), English, Spanish

Religion
- Catholicism, Taos religion (Pueblo religion)

Related ethnic groups
- Picuris Pueblo, Sandia Pueblo, Isleta Pueblo, Ysleta del Sur Pueblo, Tanoan peoples

Taos Pueblo, also called the Pueblo of Taos, Pueblo de Taos, or Teotho, is an ancient Tiwa-speaking Pueblo inhabited by the Taos people. The Pueblo is one of the 575 federally-recognized Native American governments in the United States, and a UNESCO World Heritage Site.

Taos Pueblo is the oldest continuously inhabited city in the United States and is the only U.S. World Heritage Site where people live; about 4,500 people lived there in 2012. The Pueblo's old town lies about 1 mile (1.6 km) north of the modern town of Taos, New Mexico, though tribal land of 95,000 acres (38,000 ha) is attached to the Pueblo.

The Taos people settled in the Taos Valley around 900 CE. They constructed the oldest building still standing around 1000, with more ones built in the late 1200s and early 1300s. Taos was the most populous city-state of all the Pueblo peoples in the 1540s. It is the origin of the younger Tiwa Pueblos of Picuris, Sandia, Isleta, and Ysleta del Sur. Taos was the headquarters of the Pueblo Revolt in 1680 against the Spanish Empire. After this first successful anti-colonial revolution in the Americas, it became the capital city of the Pueblo republic. In the 1700s and 1800s, Taos people traded heavily with Comancheria, adopting some Plains Indians culture from the Comanche. Taos Pueblo became the capital of New Mexico again during the Río Arriba Rebellion of 1837.

The Taos people fought against the invasion of the United States during the Mexican-American War in the Taos Revolt of 1847. The 1848 Treaty of Guadalupe Hidalgo granted the people of Taos Pueblo U.S. citizenship, but it was inconsistently applied until the Supreme Court of the United States decided United States v. Sandoval in 1913. The U.S. federal government's return of Blue Lake in 1970 marked the first success of the contemporary Land Back movement and the Native Self-Determination Era. Tourism is a major part of the economy of Taos Pueblo.

== Setting ==
The pueblo was constructed in a setting backed by the Taos Mountains of the Sangre de Cristo Range. The settlement was built on either side of Rio Pueblo de Taos, also called Rio Pueblo and Red Willow Creek, a small stream that flows through the middle of the pueblo compound. Its headwaters come from Blue Lake, or Ba Whyea, in the nearby mountains.

Taos Pueblo is one of several settlements established in the late 13th and early 14th centuries.

Taos Pueblo's most prominent architectural feature is a multi-storied residential complex of reddish-brown adobe, built on either side of the Rio Pueblo.

The pueblo was designated a National Historic Landmark on October 9, 1960. In 1992 it was designated as a UNESCO Heritage Site. As of 2010, about 150 people live in the historical pueblo full-time.

== Name ==
=== Taos language ===
In the Tanoan language of Taos (Northern Tiwa), the pueblo is referred to as "the village" in either tə̂otho "in the village" (tə̂o- "village" + -tho "in") or tə̂obo "to/toward the village" (tə̂o- "village" + -bo "to, toward"). The proper name of the pueblo is ȉałopháymųpʼȍhə́othə̀olbo "at red willow canyon mouth" (or ȉałopháybo "at the red willows" for short).

== History ==
=== Pre-Columbian ===
It is most likely that the Taos Indigenous people, along with other Pueblo Indigenous people, settled along the Rio Grande after migrating south from the Four Corners region.

Throughout its early years, Taos Pueblo was a central point of trade between the native populations along the Rio Grande and their Plains Tribes neighbors to the northeast. Taos Pueblo hosted a trade fair each fall after the agricultural harvest.

=== Post-contact ===
Spanish conquistadors first arrived at Taos Pueblo in 1540; they were members of the Francisco Vásquez de Coronado expedition, which stopped at many of New Mexico's pueblos in search of the rumored Seven Cities of Gold. Around 1620, Spanish Jesuits oversaw construction of the first Catholic Church in the pueblo, the mission of San Geronimo de Taos. Reports from the period indicate that the native people of Taos resisted the building of the church and forceful imposition of the Catholic religion. Throughout the 1600s, cultural tensions grew between the native populations of the Southwest and the increasing Spanish colonial presence. Taos Pueblo was no exception. By 1660, the native people killed the resident priest and destroyed the church. The Spanish responded brutally. Several years after it was rebuilt, the Pueblo Revolt of 1680 began.

=== US control and 1847 revolt ===
During the Mexican-American War, New Mexico came under United States control after the Battle of Santa Fe in August 1846. Charles Bent was appointed as the American territorial governor. Many of the Taos Pueblo people and Hispanos feared that the new American regime would dispossess them of their land, especially since Bent had been involved in land-grant speculation schemes under the Mexican regime. On January 19, 1847, Hispanos and Taos Pueblo people launched a rebellion against the US territorial government. Tomás Romero led a group of Taos Puebloans to Charles Bent's house in the town of Taos. The governor was shot with arrows, scalped, and killed.

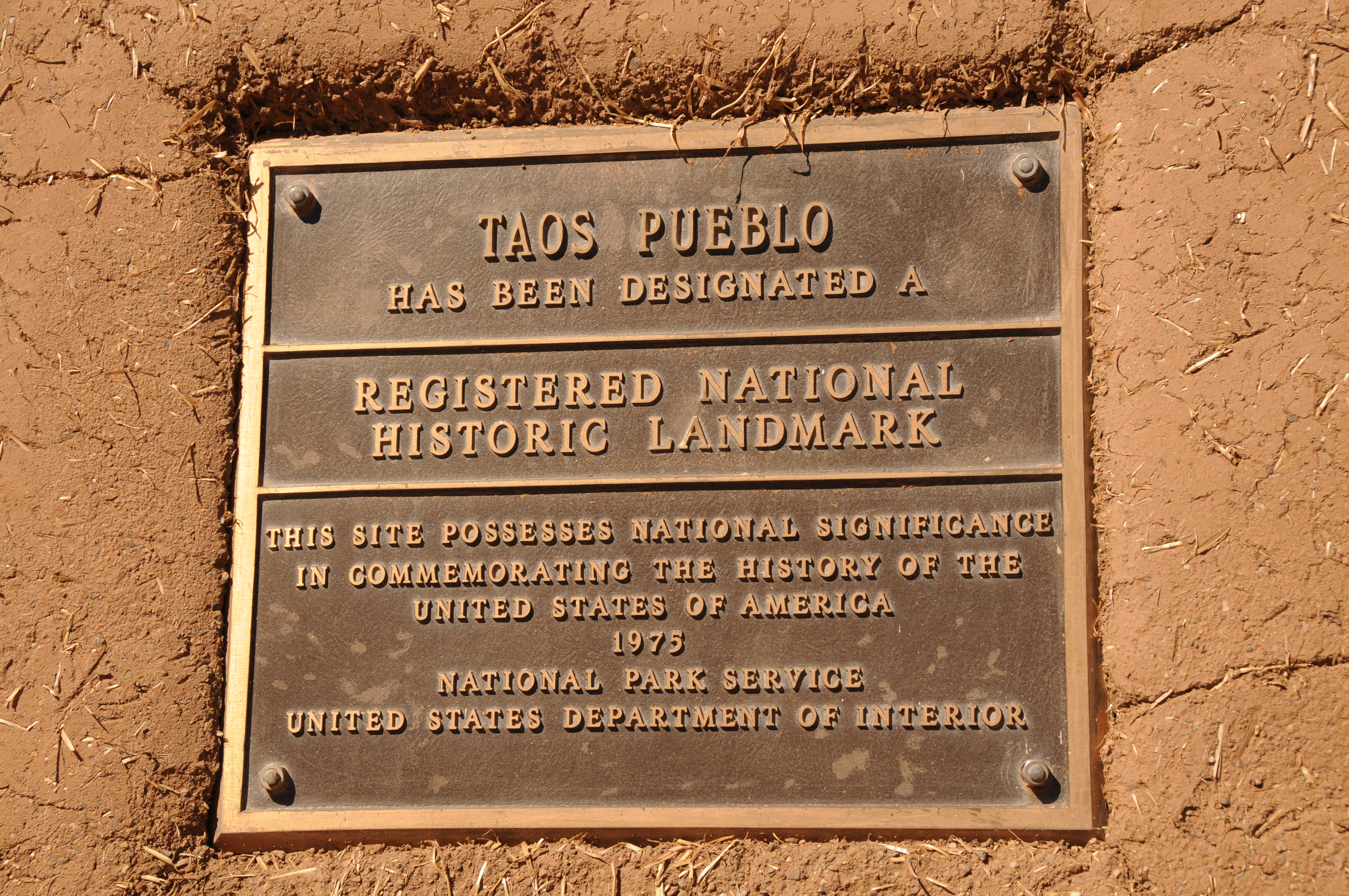
Bronze plaque, Taos Pueblo, New Mexico

Following the death of Bent and several other Americans, Col. Sterling Price, commander of the US forces based in Santa Fe, led an expedition against the insurgents, defeating them at the Battle of Cañada on January 24. The rebels retreated inside Taos Pueblo, and Price bombarded the town and the church where the defenders were sheltering with artillery on February 3. The next day, a hole was broken in the wall of the church to fire shells and grapeshot at those seeking refuge within. More than 150 people were killed during the attack. Tomás Romero was summarily executed after US forces captured Taos Pueblo.

=== Blue Lake ===
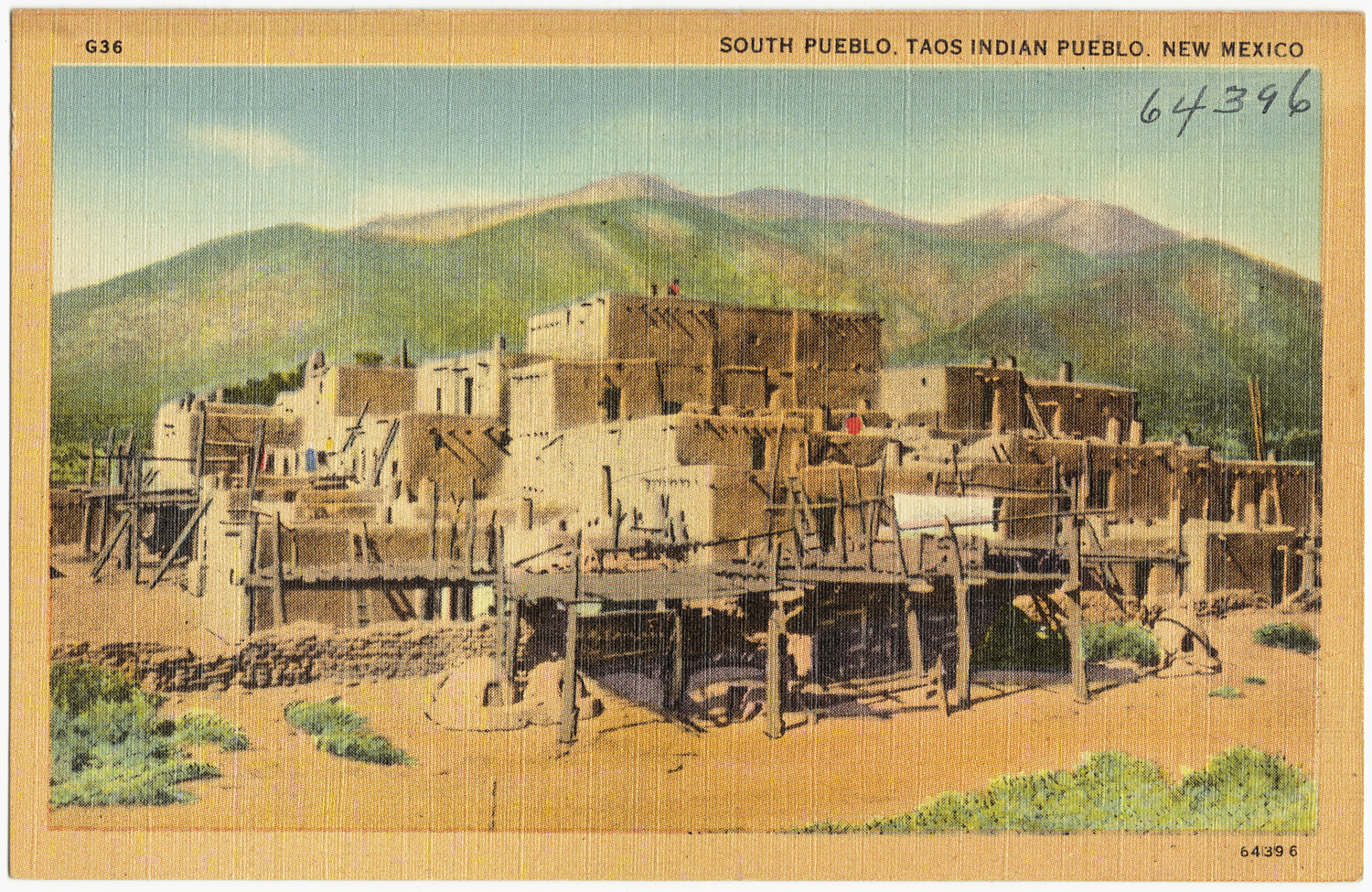
Residential adobe complex, and Taos Mountain pictured on an old postcard, circa 1930-1945.

The Pueblo's 48,000 acres (19,000 ha) of mountain land was taken by President Theodore Roosevelt and designated as the Carson National Forest early in the 20th century. It was finally returned in 1970 by the United States when the Republican Richard Nixon signed Democratic senator Fred Harris' Public Law 91-550. An additional 764 acres (309 ha) south of the ridge between Simpson Peak and Old Mike Peak and west of Blue Lake were transferred back to the Pueblo in 1996.

Blue Lake, which the people of the Pueblo consider sacred, was included in this return of Taos land. The Pueblo notably involved non-native people in lobbying the federal government for the return of Blue Lake, as they argued that their unrestricted access to the lake and the surrounding region was necessary to ensure their religious freedom. The Pueblo's web site names the reacquisition of the sacred Blue Lake as the most important event in its history due to the spiritual belief that the Taos people originated from the lake. It is believed that their ancestors live there, and the Pueblos themselves only ascend the mountain for ceremonial purposes. Blue Lake serves as a vital economic foundation for this farming community, providing the main water supply that supports their agricultural activities, including corn cultivation, fruit growing, bean production, and livestock ranching with cattle and sheep.

== Architecture ==
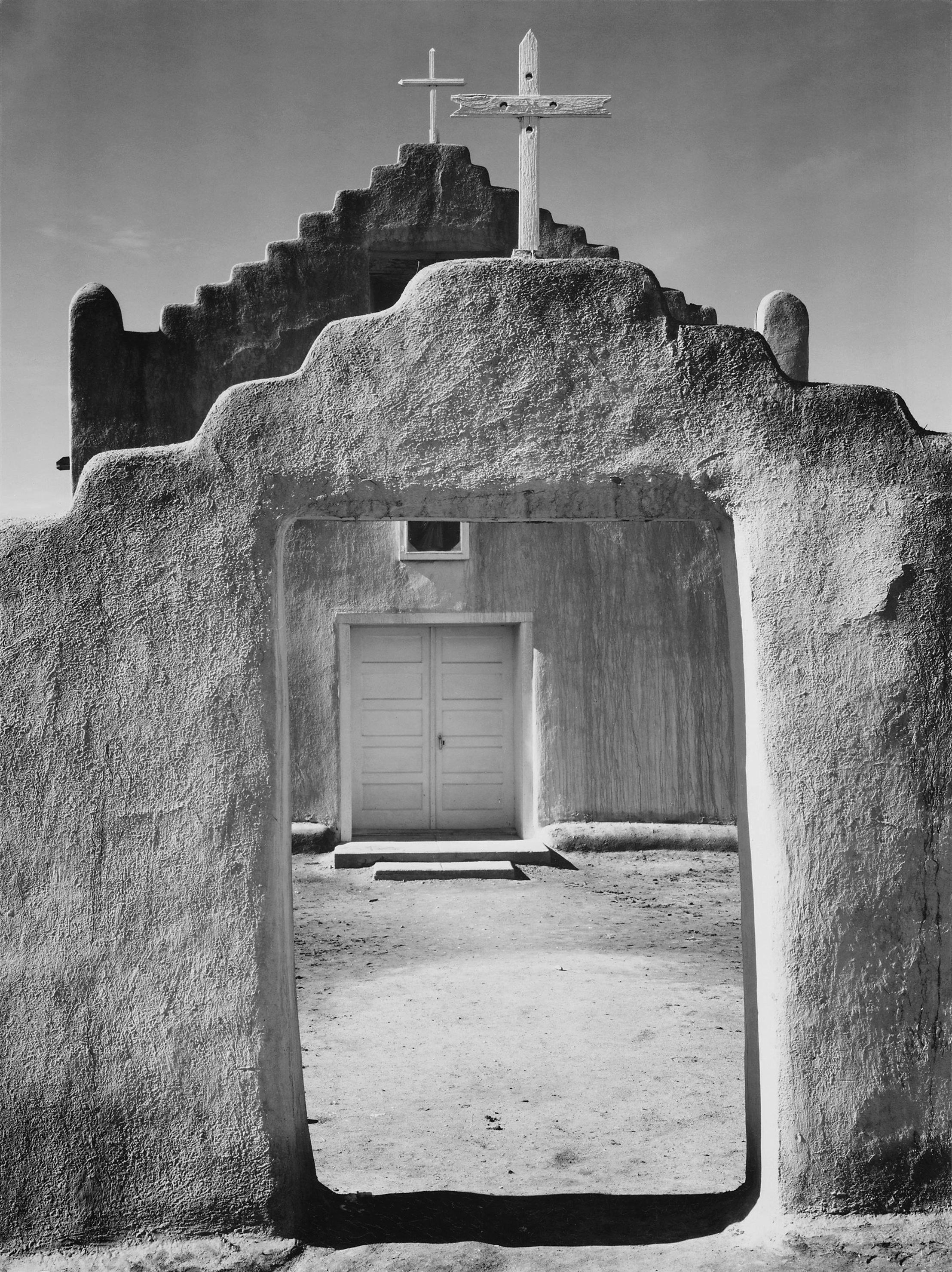
Church, Pueblo de Taos (Ansel Adams—1941)

At the time of the Spaniards' initial contact, Hernando de Alvarado described the pueblo as having adobe houses built very close together and stacked five or six stories high. The homes became narrower as they rose, with the roofs of each level providing the floors and terraces for those above.

The buildings at Taos originally had few windows and no standard doorways. Instead, access to rooms was through square holes in the roof that the people reached by climbing long, wooden ladders. Engelmann Spruce logs (or vigas) supported roofs that had layers of branches, grass, mud, and plaster covering them. The architecture and the building materials were well suited for the rigors of the environment and the needs of the people in the Taos Valley.

The first Spanish-influenced architecture appeared in Taos Pueblo after Fray Francisco de Zamora came there in 1598 to establish a mission, under orders from Spanish Governor, Don Juan de Oñate.

=== Main structure ===
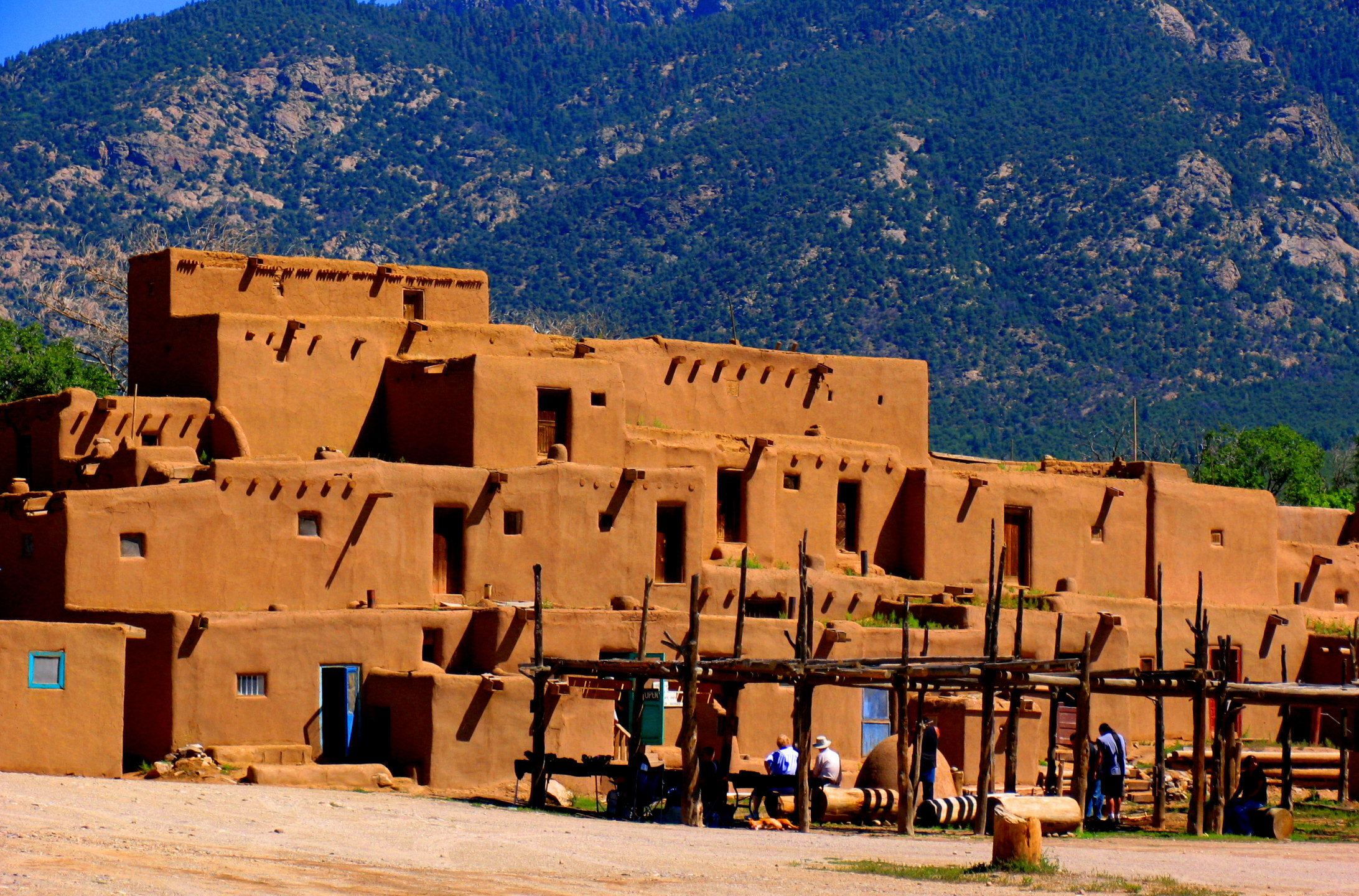
Pueblo de Taos — north side structure, circa 2005.

The north-side Pueblo is said to be one of the most photographed and painted buildings in North America. It is the largest multistoried Pueblo structure still existing. It is made of adobe walls that are often several feet thick. Its primary purpose was for defense.

=== Homes ===
The homes in this structure usually consist of two rooms, one of which is for general living and sleeping, and the second of which is for cooking, eating, and storage. Each home is self-contained; there are no passageways between the houses. Taos Indians made little use of furniture in the past, but today they have tables, chairs, and beds. In the pueblo, electricity, running water, and indoor plumbing are prohibited.

== Government ==
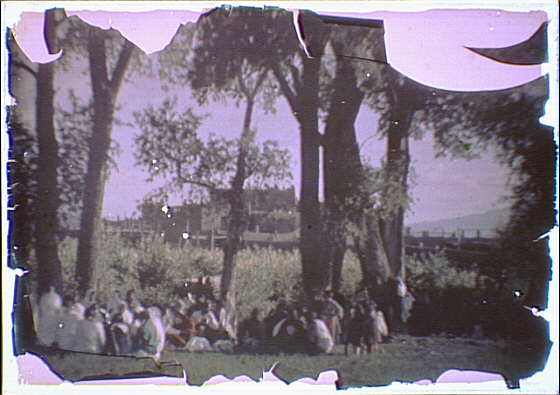
Taos Pueblo between 1906 and 1928

Taos Pueblo’s government is led by a cacique, who has both spiritual and political responsibilities. The war chief and his deputies report to the cacique and handle religious and enforcement duties. The positions of cacique and war chief are lifelong and are chosen by the Tribal Council, which is made up of former governors who serve as advisors. The cacique also manages a war captain and five assistants who serve for one year, working as both the community’s police and event organizers. Each year, the cacique selects a Governor and several assistants to represent the Pueblo in outside matters. These roles are unpaid and considered a community service.

Today, more young people and women in Taos Pueblo are taking part in tribal leadership and community activities. This marks a change from old traditions, which once limited these roles to men older than thirty.

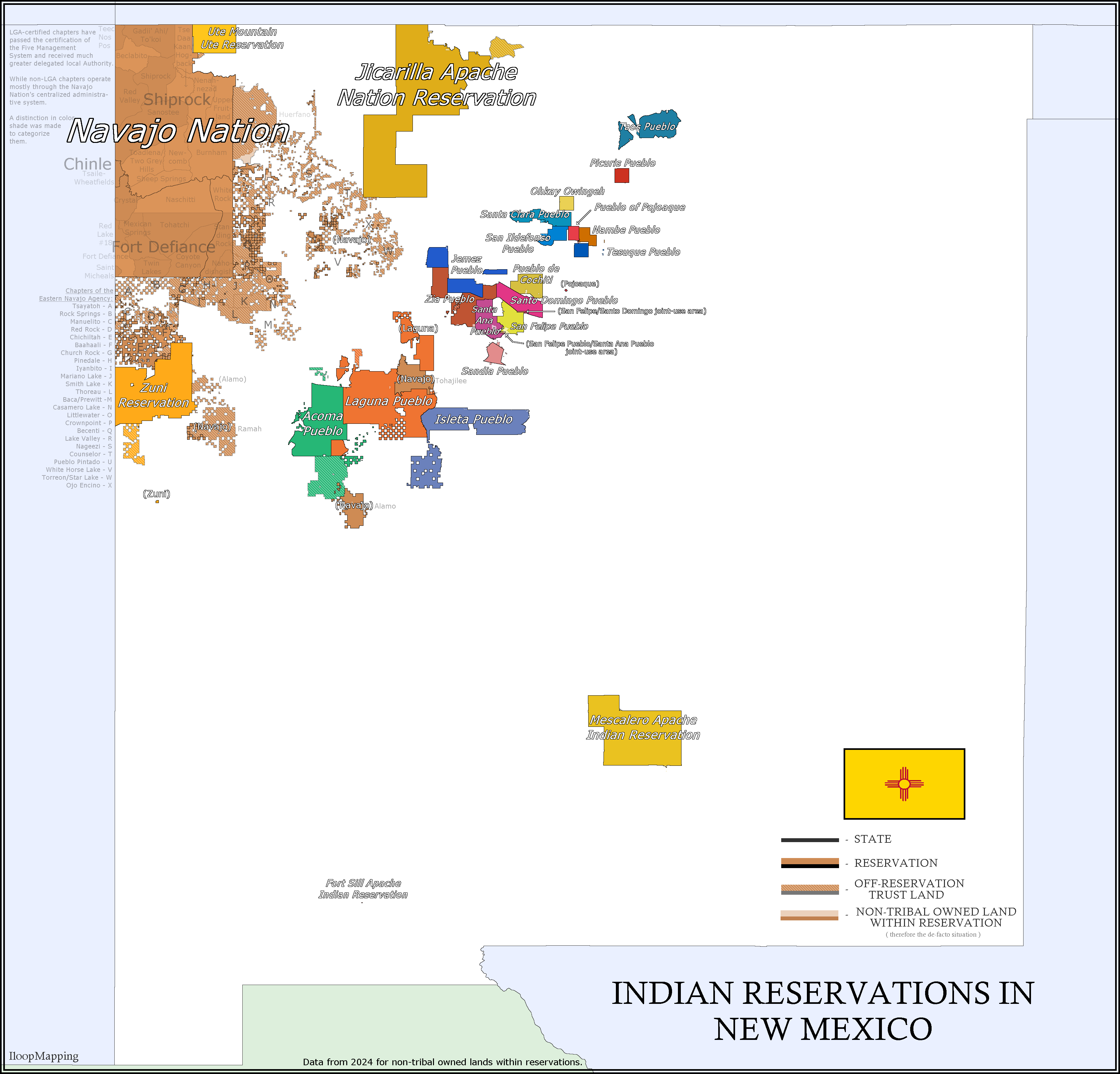
Map of the Taos and neighbouring tribes (In blue).

== Spiritual community ==
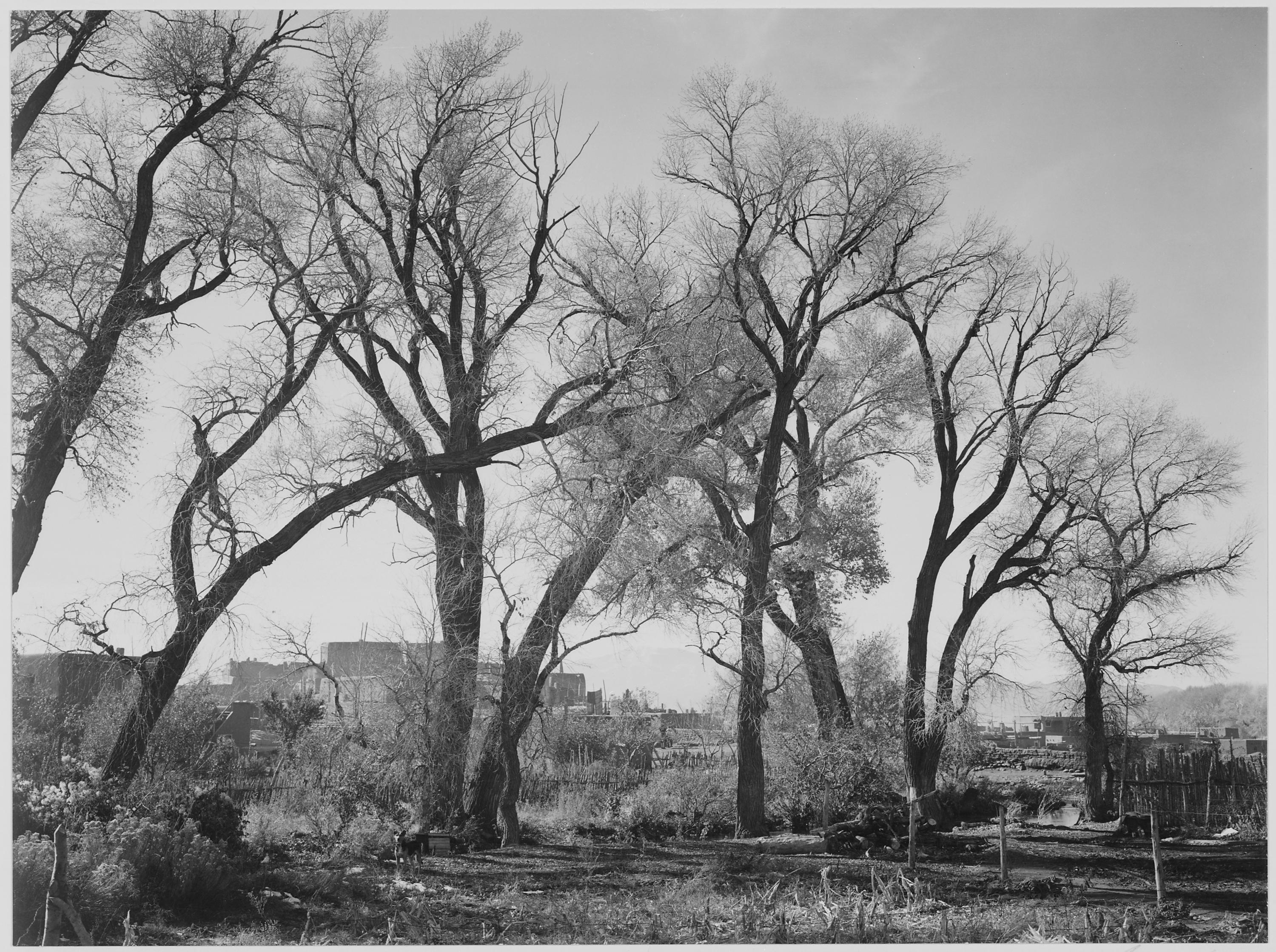
Landscape with pueblo through native cottonwood trees (Populus deltoides) (Ansel Adams—1941)

=== Religious practices ===
Religious life in Taos Pueblo is not well documented because the community keeps its spiritual traditions private. Unlike many other Pueblo groups, Taos does not practice the Kachina religion or have medicine societies. The people of Taos Pueblo follow four main faiths: the traditional Kiva religion, the Peyote movement, Roman Catholicism, and a small Baptist group.

Two spiritual practices are represented in the Pueblo: the original indigenous spiritual and religious tradition and Catholicism. The majority of Indigenous Taos continue to practice their ancient religion. Most (90%) members of the Taos Pueblo community are baptized as Catholics. Saint Jerome, or San Geronimo, is the patron saint of the pueblo.

Blue Lake is central to Taos religious and cultural life. The lake and its surrounding mountains are regarded as sacred, and water flowing from the area sustains the Pueblo and its agricultural lands. Anthropologist John J. Bodine wrote that Blue Lake represents water, life, religious authority, and the cultural integrity of the Taos community.

An annual pilgrimage to Blue Lake takes place in August. Bodine described it as the culmination of the initiation of young boys into the Pueblo's religious societies, following an extended period of instruction and preparation in a kiva. Participants travel from the Pueblo into the mountains, where observances include prayer, singing, offerings, ritual purification, and bathing in the lake. The ceremony also involves members of the wider community, who make the journey separately and later welcome the initiates. Completion of kiva initiation historically qualified a man for possible secular office and, later in life, religious leadership.

Bodine based his account primarily on field notes collected in 1906 by anthropologist Matilda Coxe Stevenson from Venturo Romero, then the head of a Taos kiva. He subsequently compared the account with information provided by knowledgeable members of the Pueblo between 1965 and 1981 and concluded that its principal features remained substantially accurate. He nevertheless recorded changes during the twentieth century, including greater use of horses during the pilgrimage, changes in clothing and purification practices, and declining participation caused partly by wage employment and increasingly restrictive eligibility requirements.

Public discussion of the ceremony has historically been limited. During campaigns against Indigenous religious practices in the 1920s, outsiders circulated allegations of coercion and sexual misconduct at Blue Lake. Bodine found no evidence supporting those claims and characterized sexual abstinence, rather than license, as consistent with the pilgrimage's religious nature. He argued that such attacks contributed to stricter controls over attendance and to the Pueblo's reluctance to disclose its religious practices. Despite changes in its observance, he described the pilgrimage as an important means of preserving Taos cultural continuity.

== Culture ==
=== Traditions involving the land ===
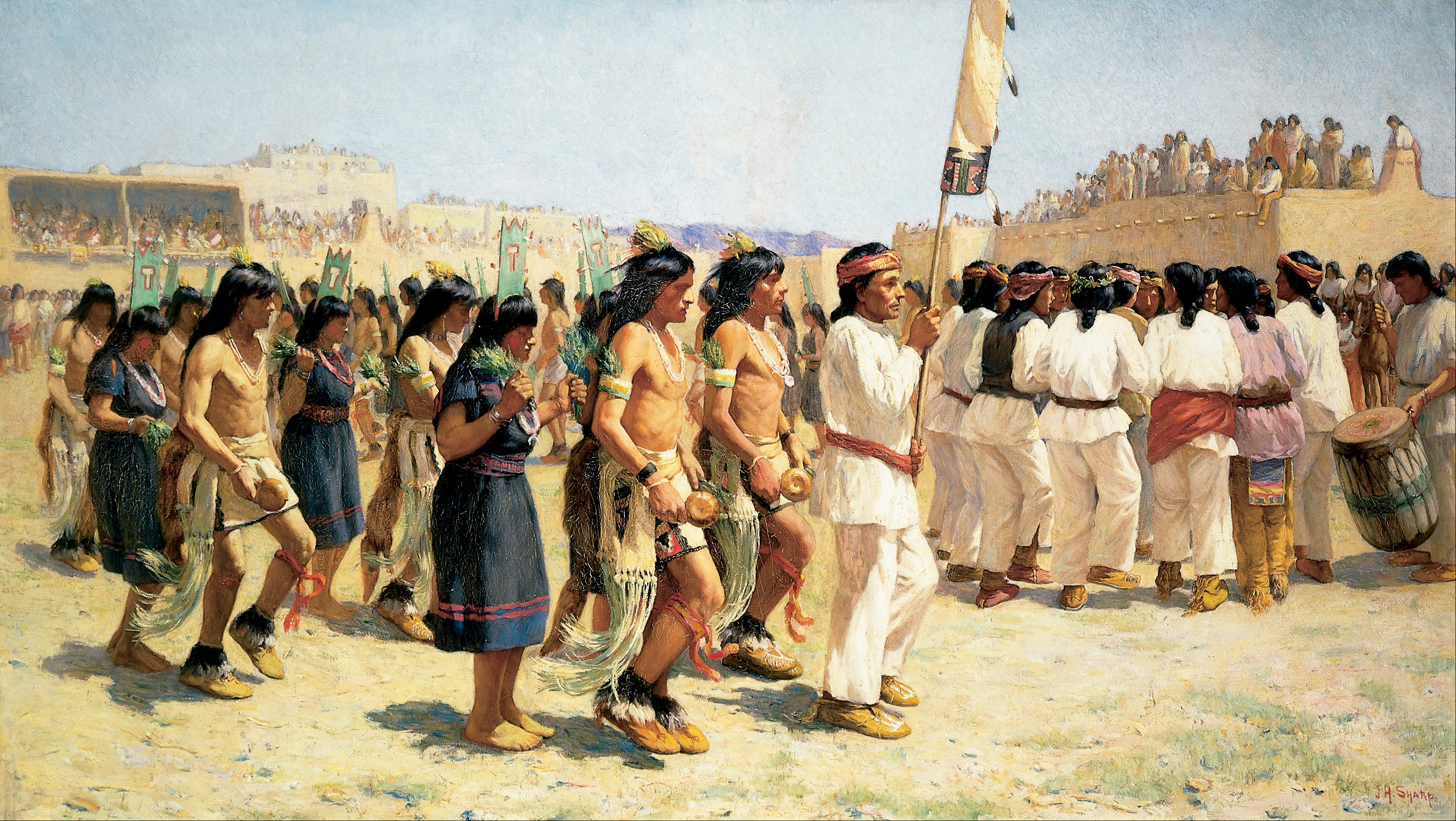
The Harvest Dance, painting by Joseph Henry Sharp

Since Spanish colonization, the native Taos people have resisted cultural change and influence with European ideas. Many ethnographers observe a high level of "interconnectedness and mutual dependence" between the Taos Pueblo and their surrounding land, where they derive many of their cultural traditions. Consequently, a historical rivalry exists between the people on the South side of the river (summer people) and the North side (winter people). Foot races, which have significant religious meaning in the tribe, are a common way for these two groups to express their rivalry, and there is a long held tradition in their tribe that was possibly created before the pyramids. In addition, the Taos Pueblo attribute great value to Blue Lake in regards to their "living culture and agricultural sustainability."

=== Death traditions ===
According to Wood, the Taos Pueblo people never turn strangers away from their doors because they value both courtesy and hospitality. However, on All Souls' Day, the Taos Pueblo spend a day with their families and close their village to any non-Indian. The Taos Pueblo approach death with an air of "stoicism".

=== Gender ===
In the cultural fabric of the Taos Pueblo, the ethnographic data suggests that women are considered to be subordinate to men. The Pueblo social structure is dictated by kiva memberships, and women are not allowed to take part in the rituals held in these sacred spaces because they "are not trained" to do so. Despite the exclusion of women from some spiritual activities, the women in the Taos Pueblo society "exercised a considerable degree of influence economically, politically, and interpersonally." For example, single women can run their own households, and married women control their own finances because they traditionally work as cooks or maids. Additionally, women have informal decision making power, using their abilities to influence the men around them.

== Health ==
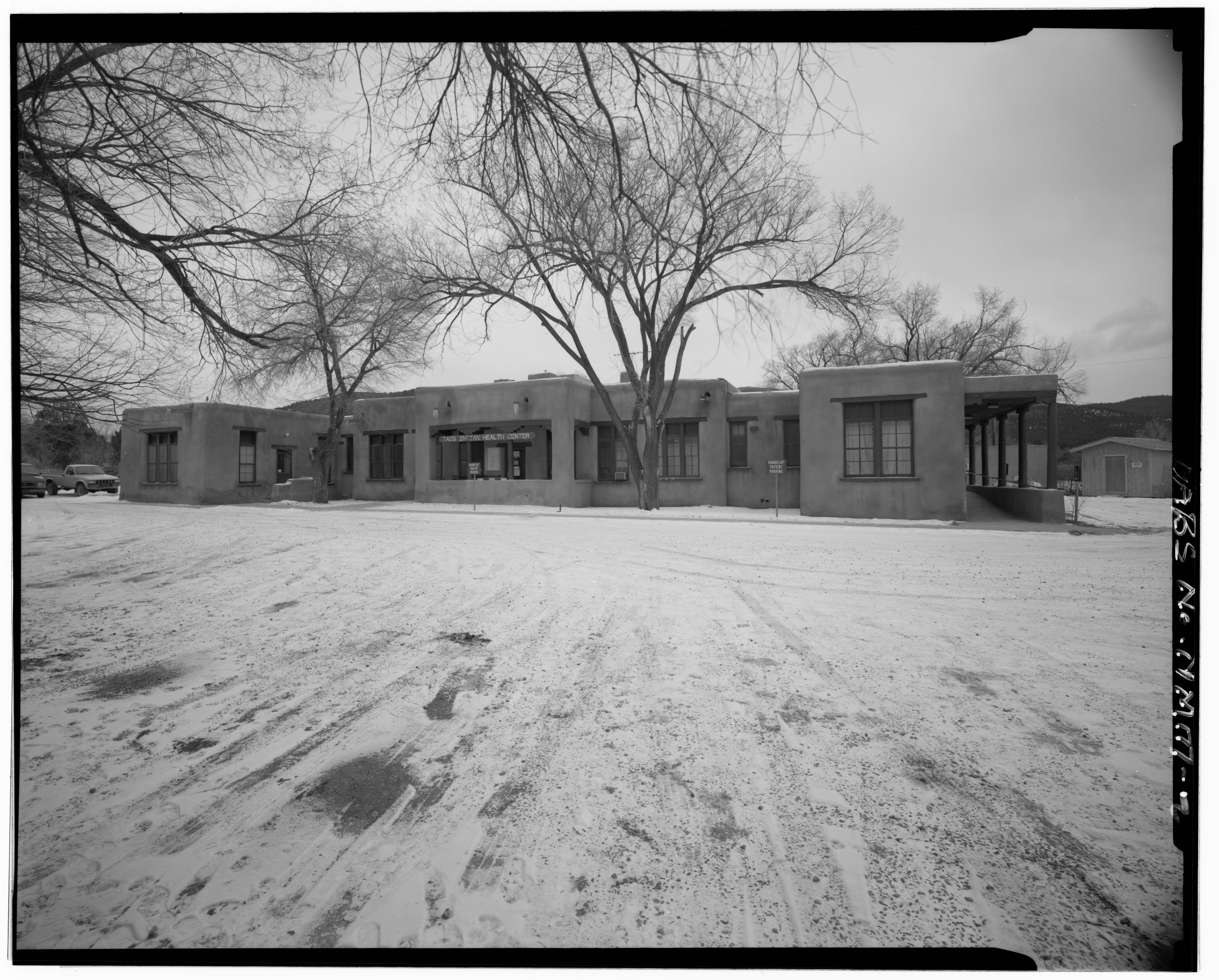
Taos Indian Health Center

Taos Pueblo, New Mexico, supports community health through several programs, such as its Public Health Nursing Department, a fitness program for seniors, and educational activities for children. The community also runs the Red Willow Cooperative, which acts as both a farmers market and a farm that grows organic food for local people. The cooperative gives jobs to high school students and teaches young people about sustainable farming and food production.

== Conservation ==
In 2011, the Taos Pueblo Preservation Program received a $800,000 grant from the U.S. Department of Housing and Urban Development. The fund aims to hire more workers, especially those who are trained in traditional construction techniques for conservation work, as well as workshop assistants who help pueblo homeowners with maintenance of traditional adobe homes. Supervisors teach trainees about traditional construction methods while rebuilding the majority of an 11-unit house which was in a state of near collapse.

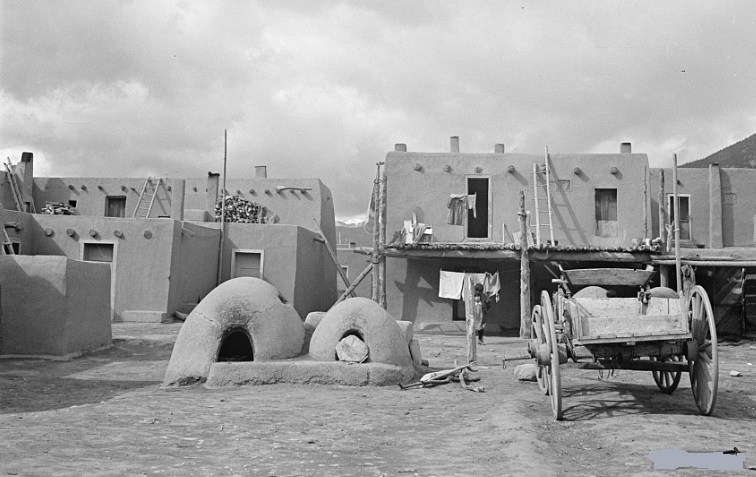
Taos Pueblo in 1936 showing hornos (clay ovens)

The first phase of the conservation of Taos Pueblo is the construction of the training center, restoration of 120 to 150 houses, training of the local people in the community, creation of a detailed assessment of the structure of the compound, and establishment of a cultural center and tribal archives. The second phase was financed by the World Monument Fund. It is listed on its watchlist because of its endangered nature, both culturally and structurally. By the end of the conservation efforts, twenty-one adobe houses are expected to be restored. The previous fund has also covered the cost of a laser scanning of the structures.

The main characteristics of the conservation of Taos Pueblo aim to encourage a community-based approach. They include the training of local people to manage their own property, as well as the establishment of partnerships with government and non-government entities. The project resolves to preserve the traditional way of life in the community and sustain cultural traditions.

In August 2020, the United States Department of Housing and Urban Development announced a grant of $899,754 awarded to the Taos Pueblo Housing Authority to rehabilitate five housing units to help reduce the risk of transmitting COVID-19. The grant will also be used to provide rental, food, and utility assistance.

== Visual arts and pottery ==
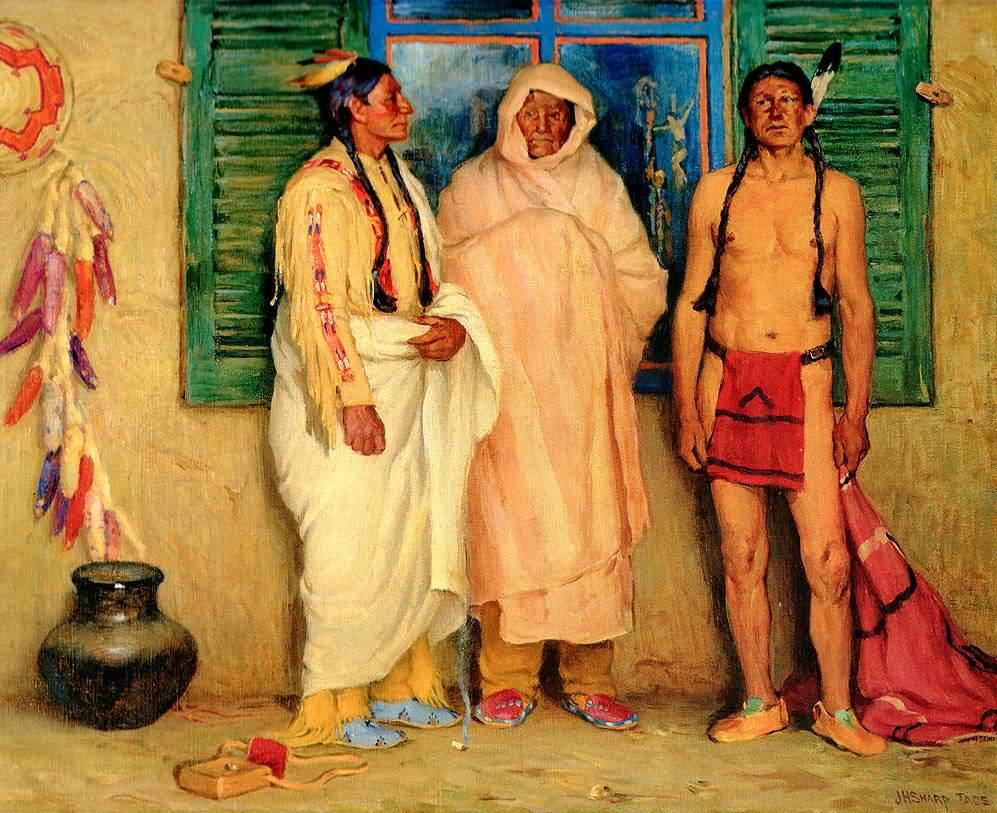
'Three Taos Indians' by Joseph Henry Sharp, oil on canvas, pre-1953

Taos Pueblo is known for its craftspeople and traditional art forms, such as silver and turquoise jewelry, heishi bead necklaces, and pottery. Heishi beads are usually made from carved seashells or soft stones. The pueblo’s pottery is unique because it uses micaceous clay, which contains mica that gives the pots a shiny orange color when fired. These sturdy, simple ceramics are valued for both their beauty and practicality, as they can be used for cooking over open flames or in ovens.

== Notable Taos Pueblo people ==
- Antonio Archuleta, painter
- Trinidad Archuleta, artist
- Ochwiay Biano, elder, political leader
- Pop Chalee, painter
- Juanita Suazo Dubray, potter
- Albert Looking Elk (c. 1888–1940), painter
- Albert Lujan (1892–1948), painter
- Patricia Michaels, fashion designer, textile artist
- Eva Mirabal (1920–1968), comic artist, painter
- Juan Mirabal (1903–1981), painter
- Robert Mirabal, Native American flute–player
- Tomás Romero (revolutionary) (died 1848), military leader
- DeAnna Autumn Leaf Suazo (1992–2021), painter
- Pop Wea, a.k.a Lori Tanner (died 1966), painter

== See also ==
- Elk-Foot of the Taos Tribe
- National Register of Historic Places listings in Taos County, New Mexico
- List of National Historic Landmarks in New Mexico
- List of the oldest buildings in New Mexico
