= Felipe Archuleta =

American painter

Felipe Benito Archuleta
- Born: Felipe Benito Archuleta; August 23, 1910; Santa Cruz, New Mexico
- Died: 1991 (aged 81); Tesuque, New Mexico

Felipe Benito Archuleta (1910–1991) was a Hispanic artist who worked mostly in New Mexico. Felipe Benito Archuleta grew up poor. He left school at an early age to work as a field hand and later as a stonemason, cook, and for many years a carpenter. His Spanish heritage exposed him to "bulto" making, the shaping of wooden religious figures used in shrines. In 1967, unable to find work, Felipe prayed to God to alleviate his poverty and desperation. His subsequent religious awakening led to his work as a carver of animals. Felipe is best known for his animal sculptures that emphasize the ferocious nature of the animals he portrays by providing them with irregularly carved teeth, wide-eyed stares, and exaggerated snouts and genitals.

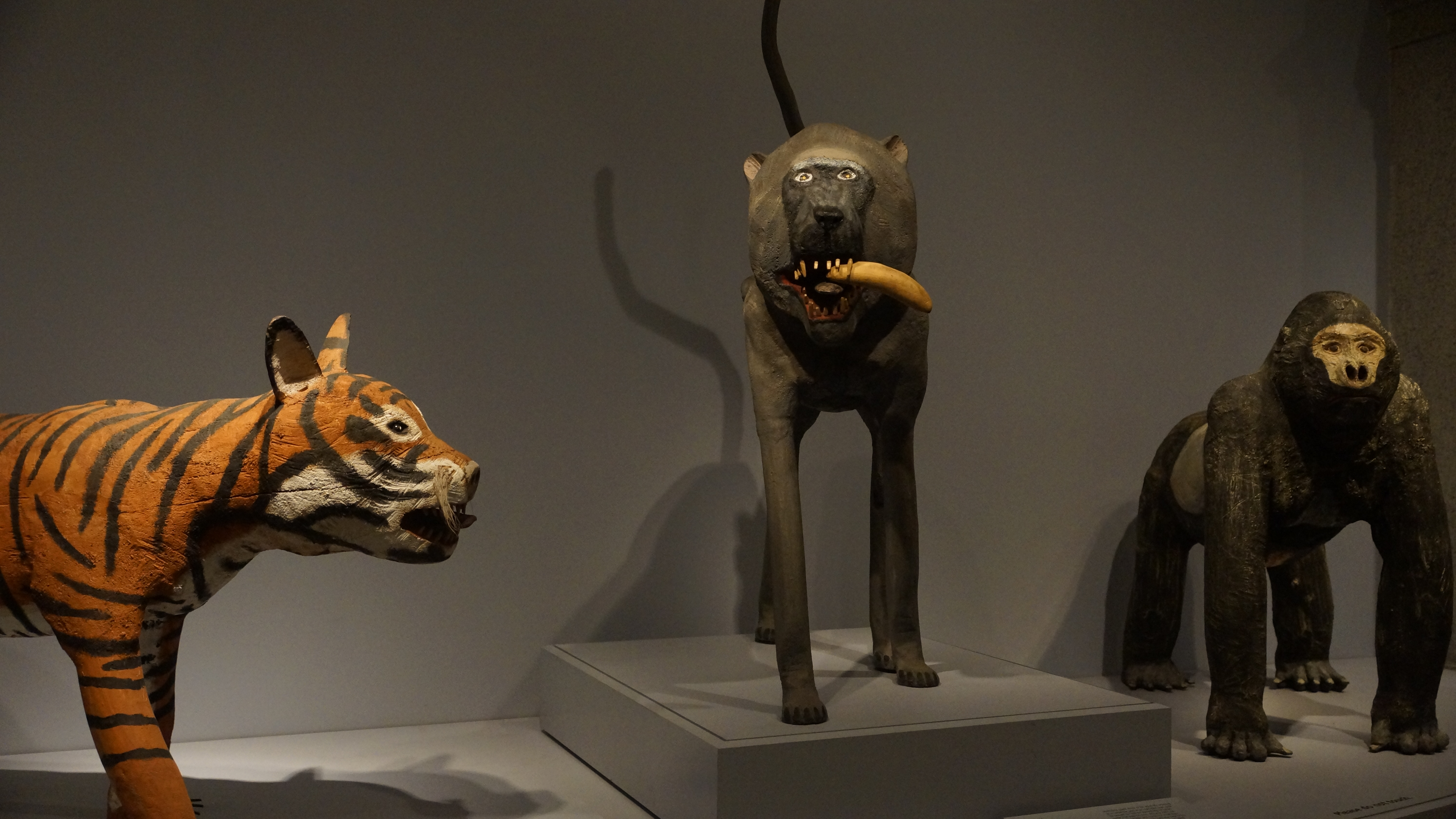
Felipe Archuletas' artwork

Archuleta carved his last major work in the Spring of 1987 due to suffering from arthritis.
