= Trinidad Archuleta =

Taos Pueblo painter (1905–1981)

Joe Trinidad Archuleta
- Born: September 13, 1905; Taos Pueblo, New Mexico
- Died: 1981 (aged 75–76)
- Citizenship: American, Taos Pueblo
- Occupation: painter
- Spouse: Rufina Romero

"Turtle Dance, Taos Pueblo," graphite, watercolor and gouache on paper.

Joe Trinidad Archuleta (September 13, 1905 – 1981) was a Pueblo-American painter and muralist from the Taos Pueblo. Some of his works are in the permanent collection of institutions including the Museum of New Mexico.

Archuleta was from a family of farmers. In 1922 he married Rufina Romero. He became a known painter in the Taos area, sometimes collaborating with other local artists on public murals. In middle age, Archuleta and his wife, Ruffina, spent time at the utopian D. H. Lawrence Ranch with D. H. Lawrence, along with his uncle Tony Luhan, Luhan's wife Mabel Dodge Luhan, and artist Dorothy Brett. A buffalo painting by Archuleta can be found on the west wall of the Lawrence Cabin at the Ranch. The mural depicts He also worked as a ranch hand and trail guide at the ranch.

== Collections ==
Archuleta's work is found in the collection of the Millicent Rogers Museum. He produced a painted mural of buffalo in 1934 for the D.H. Lawrence Ranch.
