= Lake San Agustín =

Former lake in New Mexico, United States

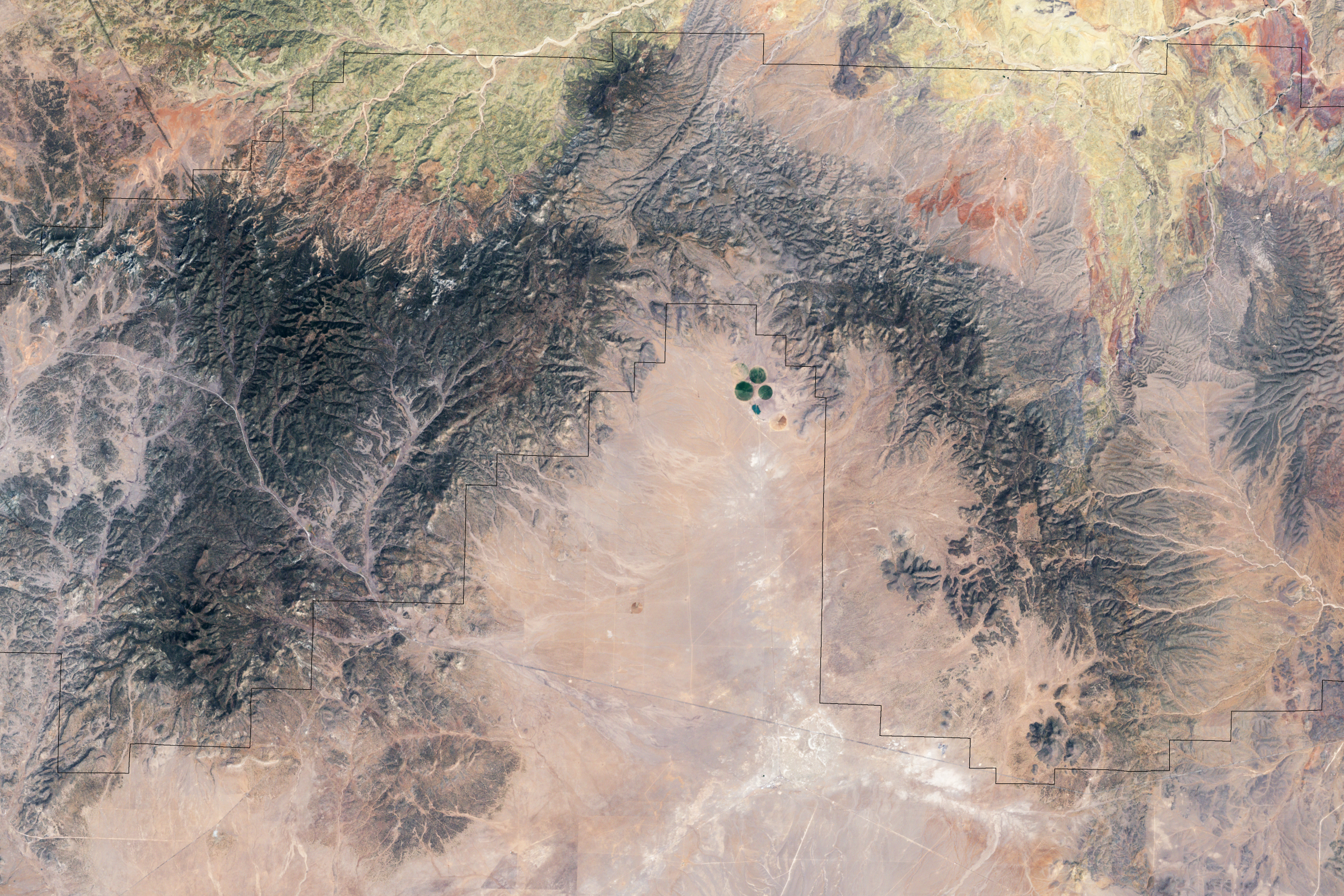
- Satellite image of the northern basin

- Coordinates: 33.82°N 108.19°W

Lake San Agustín is a former lake in New Mexico, which developed as a pluvial lake in the Plains of San Agustín during Pleistocene glacial periods. During its highstands it covered an area of 1,200 square kilometres (460 sq mi) with a maximum depth of 70 metres (230 ft), and split into several separate lakes while drying out. The lake last appeared during the Last Glacial Maximum (LGM) and dried out at the beginning of the Holocene, with the last remnant disappearing about 5,000 years ago.

The lake may have been an important resource for local Paleoindian people, with many archeological sites such as the Ake site associated with its environments. Presently, the Very Large Array radiotelescopes are located on the basin of the former lake, and core samples taken from its bed have been used to reconstruct the past vegetation of New Mexico.

== Description ==
The area of the former lake is now part of Catron County, with a small part in Socorro County, and is 90 kilometres (56 mi) west of Socorro, all in New Mexico. The Very Large Array radiotelescopes are situated on the floor of the northeastern basin. Datil and Horse Springs are located north of it. State Road 12 runs along part of its northwestern shore, and U.S. Route 60 crosses over the northeastern lake bed.

Three lake basins, connected by channels, lie on the floor of the former lake; these are C-N Lake at 2,101 metres (6,893 ft) elevation, San Agustin Lake at 2,065 metres (6,775 ft), and White Lake at 2,119 metres (6,952 ft). San Agustin Lake isalso known as the Horse Springs basin. The basin is not entirely closed; groundwater outflow appears to occur.

=== Former state ===
At highstand, the lake was 90 kilometres (56 mi) long and 30 kilometres (19 mi) wide. Water covered an area of 1,200 square kilometres (460 sq mi) and had a maximum depth of 70 metres (230 ft); the Wisconsin glaciation-age lake reached 2,115 metres (6,939 ft) elevation and had an area of 785 square kilometres (303 sq mi). It consisted of basins connected by overflow, a southwestern one with a roughly rectangular outline and a northeastern basin with an irregular shape. The northeastern basin featured three sub-basins (North Lake, C-N basin and White Lake), while the southwestern one had only one towards its southwestern end (Horse Springs). Lake San Agustín was a freshwater lake, but salinity varied by seasons and on average, alkaline waters may have been more common. The freshness of its waters may indicate that it overflowed (which would prevent salts from accumulating) but there is no geomorphological evidence of an overflow.

The former lake left shorelines between 2,070 metres (6,790 ft) and 2,149 metres (7,051 ft) elevation. Shoreline features mapped around Lake San Agustín include beaches, beach bars, fan-shaped deltas, spits and wave-cut notches. The shores of the former lake included numerous bays, which developed bars and spits. Alluvial fans from the Mogollon Slope drained into the lake; the shorelines are cut into the fans and their further development after the lake dried up is feeble.

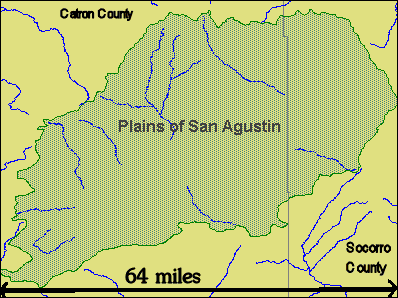
Watershed map

Its watershed covered an area of 3,880 square kilometres (1,500 sq mi), and was covered by pine-spruce forests. The lake was surrounded by mountains. Counterclockwise from north these include the Gallinas Mountains-Datil Mountains, the Continental Divide-Mangas Mountain-Tularosa Mountain, Continental Divide-Elk Mountains-O Bar O Mountain-Pelona Mountain-Luera Mountains and San Mateo Mountains. None of these mountains were glaciated during the Pleistocene; today they are remote and largely devoid of surface water.

=== Flora and fauna ===
Lake sediments contain remnants of diatoms, freshwater algae, gastropods, ostracods and sedges, including petrified plants. Pine-spruce woodlands and sagebrush grew along the shore and surroundings of Lake San Agustín, bulrushes were conspicuous features of the landscape. The fauna that lived around the lake share characteristics with present-day populations that occur at higher elevations and/or farther north.

Animal fossils found in lake deposits include unidentified species, but also fish and:

- Amphibians such as frogs and toads, mole salamanders, and North American spadefoots.
- Birds such as black geese, Anas ducks, grebes, and owls.
- Mammals such as American badgers, American mastodons, bisons, camels, deermice, Eastern meadow voles, ground squirrels, horses, jackrabbits, mammoths, muskrats, peccaries, prairie dogs, rabbits, short-faced bears, smooth-toothed pocket gophers, and Microtus voles. They are part of the Rancholabrean fauna and one of its most important New Mexico sites.
- More than 30 species of molluscs.
- Reptiles such as mud turtles.

== History ==
Based on a 300 metres (980 ft) long core drilled into the floor of the basin, sedimentation goes back to the Pliocene but was variable over time. It is the only basin in the region where the Neogene infill has been probed by coring.

Lakes may have existed for 650,000 years in the Plains of San Agustín but the existence of pre-Pleistocene lakes in the area is possible. The lake intermittently appeared during glacial stages of the Pleistocene, with the largest lakes forming before the Last Glacial Maximum (LGM). During the cold temperatures of the LGM 20,900 years ago, water levels reached 2,110–2,120 metres (6,920–6,960 ft) elevation. Warming set in 9,800 or 19,800 years ago but the water levels began to decline only after 19,000 years ago. Some fluctuations may be correlated to the Dansgaard-Oeschger cycles in Greenland. Individual highstands at Lake San Agustín 22,000, 19,000, 17,000 and 16,000 years ago are correlated to contemporaneous highstands of Lake Estancia and Lake King in Texas, as well as Lake Lisan in the Near East. During the last glacial maximum highstand, moisture influx was more than four times larger than present-day moisture supply and until 13,000 years ago precipitation primarily fell during winter.

By around 13,200 years ago, water levels had dropped beneath the 2,105 metres (6,906 ft) elevation of the "Bat Cave shoreline". Subsequent wet periods occurred during the Bolling-Allerod and Younger Dryas, supported by a stronger North American Monsoon. About 8,000 years ago, the climate warmed and the region became more arid. As water levels dropped, the lake eventually split into three basins. By 11,300-10,200 years ago, Lake San Agustín had dropped below 2,105 metres (6,906 ft) elevation, but an alkaline lake persisted in the Horse Springs basin until 5,000 years ago. Erosion during the Holocene removed parts of the sediment and produced dunes and sand sheets. Some low shorelines may have formed during a wet interval around 500 BCE. Presently, there is no permanent water body in the Plains of San Agustín, but ephemeral lakes sometimes form after wet years.

Lake San Agustín is one of many pluvial lakes in the wider region of Arizona, California, Nevada, and New Mexico. During the ice age, the Laurentide Ice Sheet expanded and displaced the jet stream and its precipitation systems to the south; simultaneously the Atlantic Ocean cooled and the Pacific warmed, increasing moisture supply to the region of the present-day Southwestern United States.

== Archeology ==
Numerous Paleoindian archeological sites have been found at the former lake, which provided important resources for early humans during the end of the ice age. The Ake Site, an archeological site on the National Register of Historic Places, is situated on the floor of the northeastern basin. Bat Cave faces the southwestern basin and formed through wave-cut erosion by Lake San Agustín. Folsom-age sites are mostly found in locations that suggest they were redeposited, or in association with aeolian deposits.

Most sites are associated with the smaller basins, implying that human activity came towards the end of Lake San Agustín's existence when it was shrinking and the smaller basins had turned into marshes and ponds. As water availability declined during the Holocene, occupation in the San Agustín area declined as well, especially after the demise of the Horse Springs lake. Early populations were hunters, later they experimented with agriculture.

Various projects to manage the cultural heritage took place in the San Agustín area, of mostly limited spatial extent except for those associated with the Very Large Array. Some of them relied on projectile points from private collections. According to an Ndé Apache creation myth, the creator Ussen warned her creation White Painted Woman of a large flood; White Painted Woman took refuge in an abalone shell and eventually became stranded on the San Agustín plains. White Painted Woman there gave rise to Child of the Water, the progenitor of the Ndé people.

== Present-day climate and vegetation ==
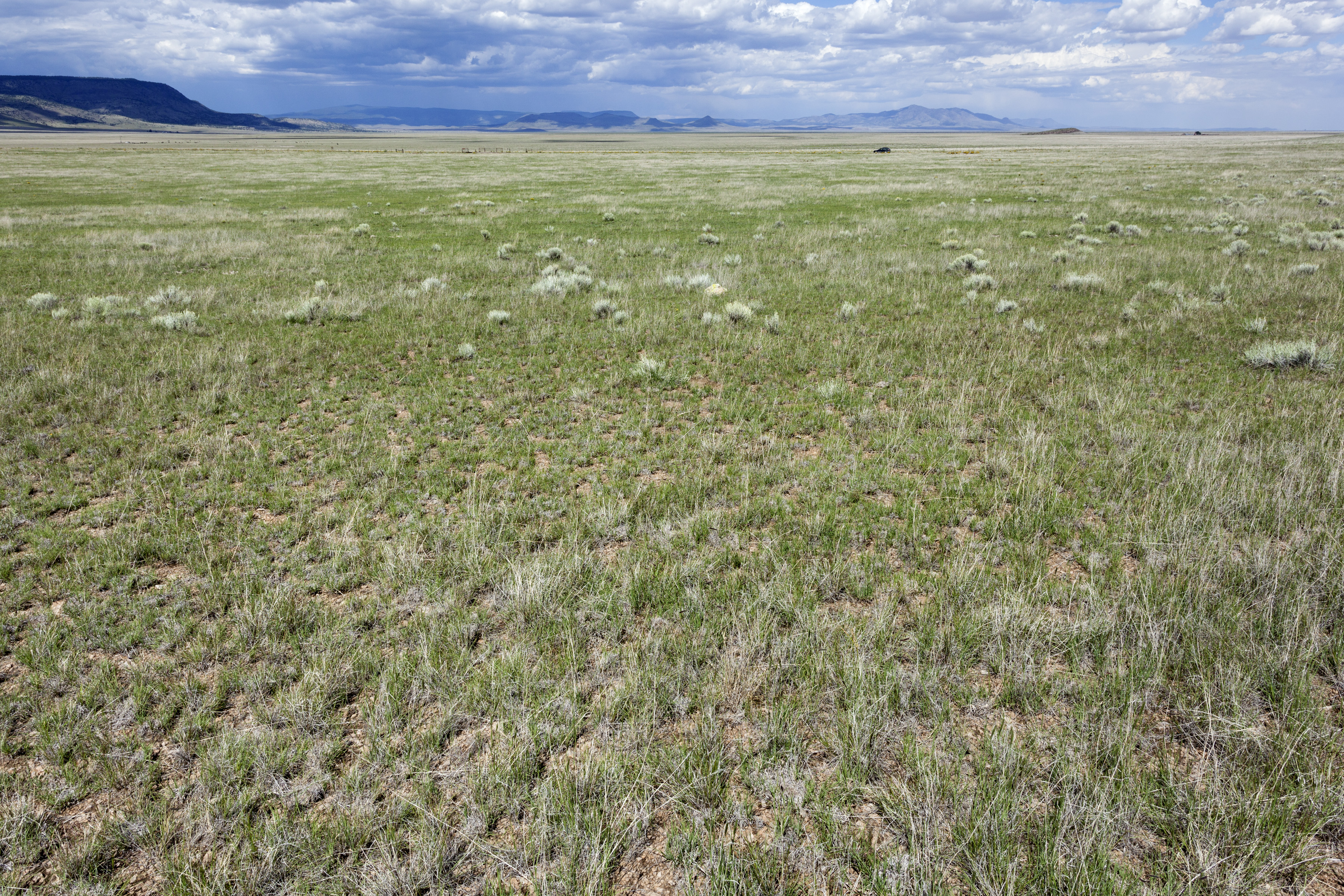
Present-day vegetation of the Plains of San Agustín

The region has a semiarid climate with a large temperature range and only sporadic precipitation. Present-day mean precipitation is 290 millimetres per year (11 in/year), while evaporation reaches 1,150 millimetres per year (45 in/year) and temperatures range between −30–40 °C (−22–104 °F); the mean is 8.5 °C (47.3 °F). Precipitation occurs during two wet seasons, one during the monsoon in summer and the other from Pacific weather systems in winter. Thunderstorms during summer can cause floods that deposit sediments in the basin.

Present-day vegetation consists of dropseeds, greasewood and saltbush grassland, as well as juniper-pinyon woodlands. Forests occur in wetter sites, below 2,700 metres (8,900 ft) elevation these are ponderosa pine forests and above that elevation Douglas fir, white fir, and the occasional spruce occur.

== Research history ==
Early reconnaissance was carried out by Kirk Bryan, with the results published in 1926. Bryan was the first to identify the existence of a former lake and named it "Lake San Augustin". In 1939 William E. Powers published a detailed study of the remnants of the former lake. Early research considered the possibility of an earlier overspill to the Rio Grande or even to the Gila River. Archeological surveys took place after World War II. In the 1970s-1990s, fossils were found on the ground of the Very Large Array and collected by the geologist Robert H. Weber, whose collection in 2014 became part of the New Mexico Museum of Natural History and Science.

Pollen deposits from the lake were used to reconstruct the vegetation of New Mexico during the LGM; they show a vegetation of pine-spruce woodlands with frequent Artemisia. Attempts to reconstruct the Pleistocene climate across several glacial cycles have all failed as of 2005, and as of 2014 none of the shorelines have been dated.

== Geology ==
The valley the lake formed in is a tectonic graben flanked by faults within the Mogollon-Datil volcanic field; it is located at the southeastern margin of the Colorado Plateau and west of the Rio Grande Rift, which the graben may be part of. Other interpretations are it is a basin formed by a circular emplacement of volcanic rocks, or a large volcanic caldera which may be the source of the 33.7 million years old Horse Springs dacite and Blue Canyon tuff. There is no evidence of recent faulting or of ongoing subsidence and the shorelines lie at the same altitude over the entire basin.

Apart from one Permian outcrop, all the rocks around the Plains of San Agustín are volcanic rocks of Eocene to Quaternary age with compositions ranging from basalt to rhyolite. West of the graben lies the dominating Horse Mountain volcano, which was active 14 million years ago, and there are other volcanic buttes in the vicinity.
