= National Register of Historic Places listings in Catron County, New Mexico =

Location of Catron County in New Mexico

This is a list of the National Register of Historic Places listings in Catron County, New Mexico.

This is intended to be a complete list of the properties and districts on the National Register of Historic Places in Catron County, New Mexico, United States. Latitude and longitude coordinates are provided for many National Register properties and districts; these locations may be seen together in a map.

There are 11 properties and 3 districts including 1 National Monument listed on the National Register in the county. All of the places within the county on the National Register are also listed on the State Register of Cultural Properties.

This National Park Service list is complete through NPS recent listings posted March 14, 2025.

Contents: NRHP in New Mexico by county
Bernalillo – Catron – Chaves – Cibola – Colfax – Curry – De Baca – Doña Ana – Eddy – Grant – Guadalupe – Harding – Hidalgo – Lea – Lincoln – Los Alamos – Luna – McKinley – Mora – Otero – Quay – Rio Arriba – Roosevelt – San Juan – San Miguel – Sandoval – Santa Fe – Sierra – Socorro – Taos – Torrance – Union – Valencia

== Current listings ==
	Name on the Register	Image	Date listed	Location	City or town	Description
1	Ake Site		April 2, 1976 (#76001193)	Address Restricted	Datil	
2	Bat Cave		April 23, 1976 (#76001194)	Address Restricted	Old Horse Springs	
3	Bearwallow Mountain Lookout Cabins and Shed		January 28, 1988 (#87002473)	Bearwallow Lookout Rd. in the Gila National Forest; 33°26′57″N 108°40′03″W	Bearwallow Park	
4	Black Mountain Lookout Cabin		January 28, 1988 (#87002474)	Gila National Forest; 33°22′41″N 108°13′36″W	Black Mountain	
5	El Caso Lookout Complex		January 28, 1988 (#87002476)	Gila National Forest; 34°06′11″N 108°29′39″W	El Caso Lake	
6	Gila Cliff Dwellings National Monument	Gila Cliff Dwellings National Monument	October 15, 1966 (#66000472)	Off New Mexico Highway 15, north of Silver City; 33°13′38″N 108°16′20″W	Silver City	
7	Mangas Mountain Lookout Complex		January 28, 1988 (#87002471)	Mangas Mountain; 34°03′07″N 108°18′24″W	Mangas	
8	Mogollon Baldy Lookout Cabin	Mogollon Baldy Lookout Cabin	January 28, 1988 (#87002470)	Gila National Forest; 33°16′18″N 108°35′40″W	Mogollon Baldy	Log cabin by the fire lookout tower at peak of Mogollon Baldy
9	Mogollon Historic District	Mogollon Historic District	September 10, 1987 (#87001541)	State Road 78; 33°23′45″N 108°47′37″W	Mogollon	
10	Mogollon Pueblo		May 5, 1978 (#78001811)	Address Restricted	Red Hill	Also called Cox Ranch Ruin
11	Socorro Mines Mining Company Mill, Fannie Hill	Socorro Mines Mining Company Mill, Fannie Hill	September 10, 1987 (#87001567)	Fannie Hill and west to Fannie Hill Mill; 33°24′11″N 108°47′56″W	Mogollon	

== See also ==
- List of National Historic Landmarks in New Mexico
- National Register of Historic Places listings in New Mexico
