= Greens Gap, New Mexico =

Coordinates: 34°05′41″N 108°08′34″W

Greens Gap is an extinct town in Catron County, in the U.S. state of New Mexico. The GNIS classifies it as a populated place.

A post office was established at Greens Gap in 1918, and remained in operation until 1942. The community was named after the local Green family, who were early settlers.
