= Datil Mountains =

Mountain range in New Mexico, United States

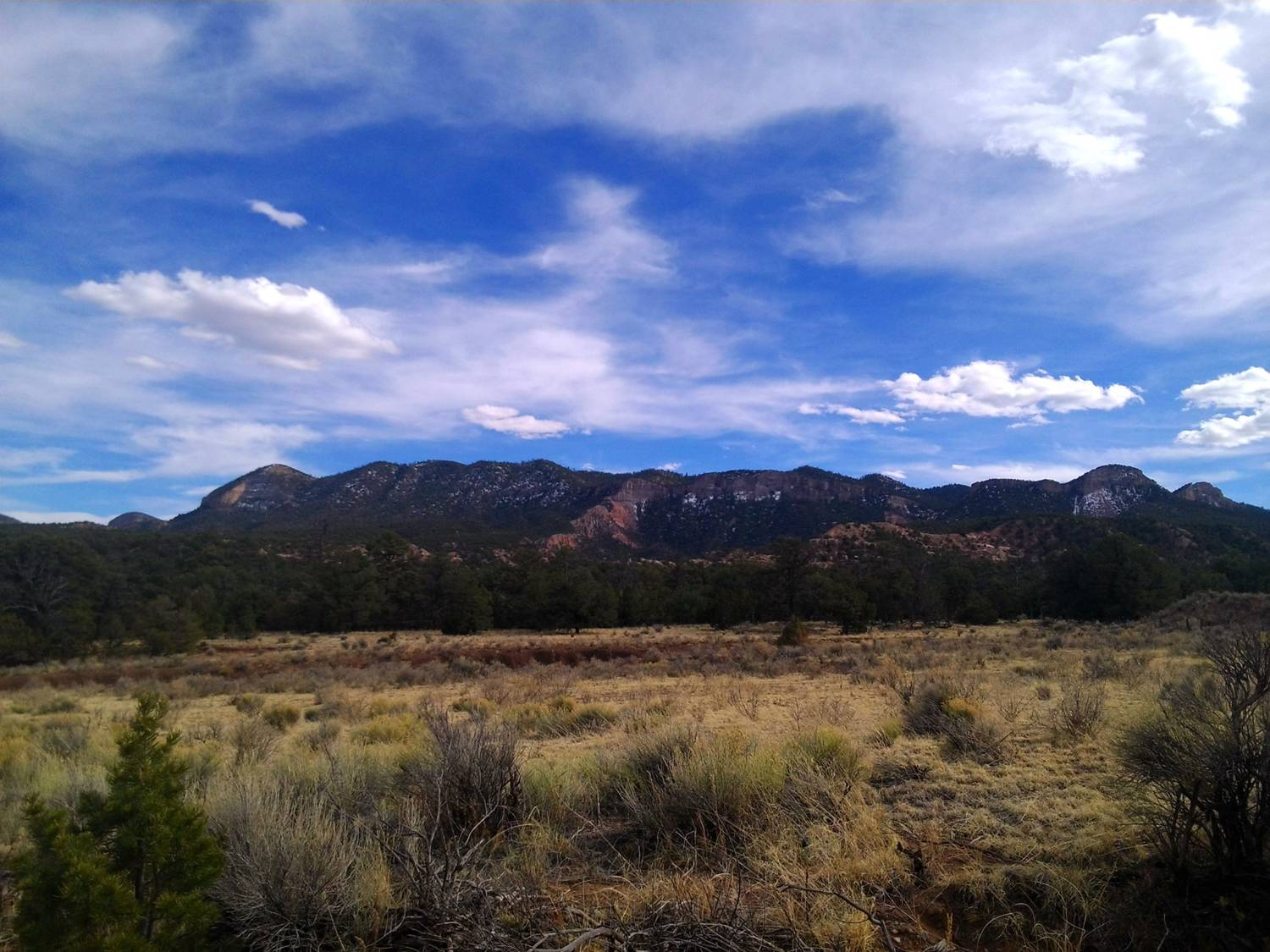
- Looking south at the Madre Mountain Inventoried Roadless Area in the Datil Mountains.

- Location within New Mexico
- Location: New Mexico, United States
- Nearest city: Datil, NM
- Coordinates: 34.291°N 107.840°W
- Governing body: U.S. Forest Service, Cibola National Forest
- Website: www.fs.usda.gov/cibola/

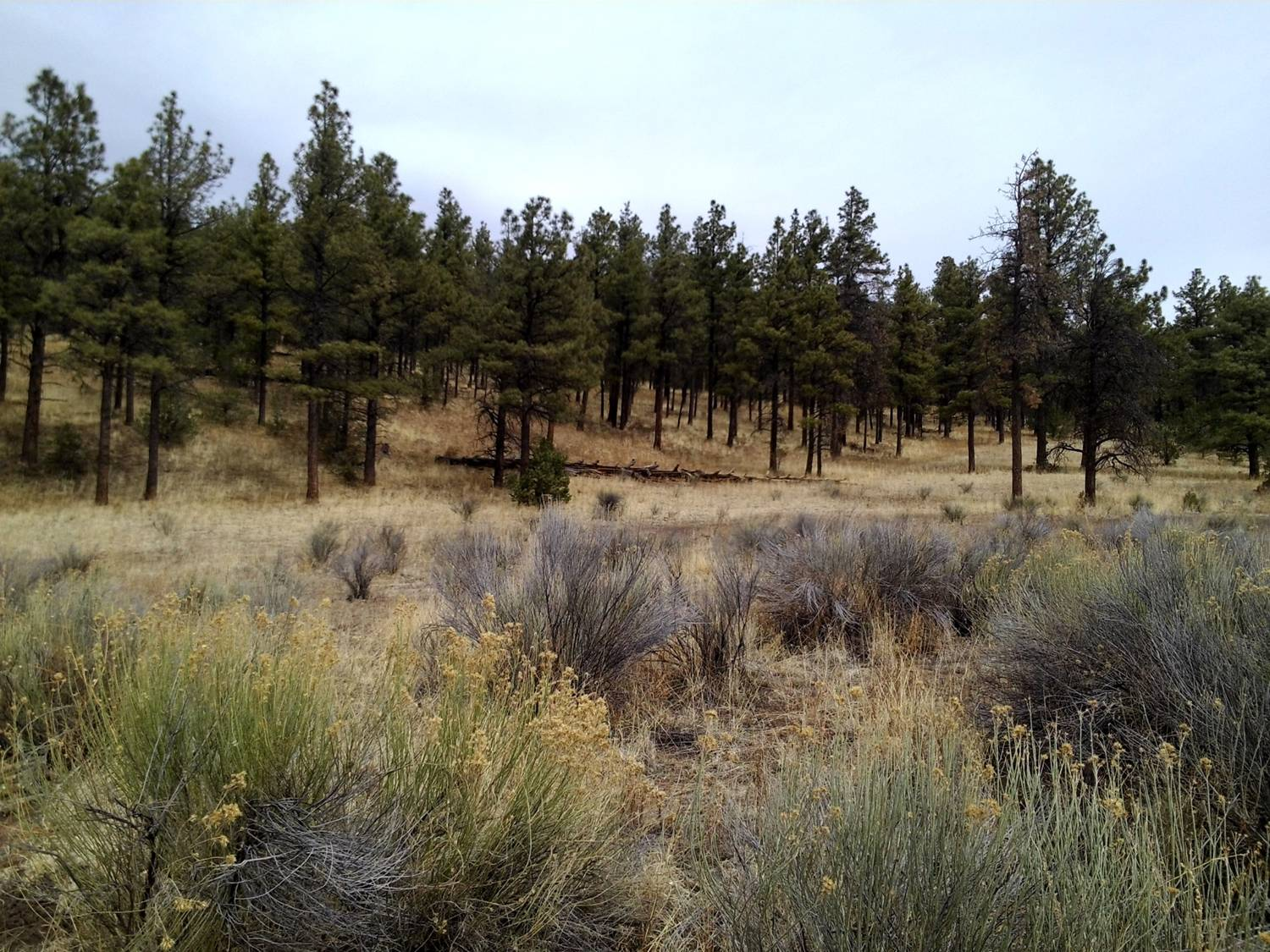
The Datil Inventoried Roadless Area within the Datil Mountains.

The Datil Mountains are a small range on the northern edge of the Mogollon-Datil volcanic field, just northwest of the Plains of San Agustin in the U.S. state of New Mexico. The range lies in Socorro and Catron Counties, north of the town of Datil, New Mexico and takes its name from the Spanish word for “date,” dating back over two hundred years. In The Place Names of New Mexico, Robert Julyan suggests two possible explanations for the name: 1) that “the seedpods of the broad-leafed yucca sufficiently resembled dates” or 2) “the Spanish applied the name to the fruit of the prickly pear cactus.” The area includes the major ridgeline of Madre Mountain (elev. 9,556 feet), which is sacred ground to the Acoma, Laguna, and Zuni tribes, as well as several other unnamed peaks and ridges. US Highway 60 crosses the Datil Mountains between the towns of Datil and Pie Town.

The majority of the Datil Mountains are part of the Magdalena Ranger District of the Cibola National Forest. There are two Inventoried Roadless Areas (IRAs) within the Datil Mountains: the Datil (13,974 acres) and Madre Mountain (19,855 acres) IRAs. The landscape is expansive and natural with steep-sided hills cloaked with dense conifer forest. The jagged Sawtooth Mountains can be seen to the west.

== Ecology ==
The Datils contain scrubland, pinyon-juniper woodland, ponderosa pine forest, deciduous oak and grassland areas. At lower elevations, grasses include black and sideoats grama, poverty three-awn, burrograss, and galleta grass. Higher up, grass species include blue and hairy grama, and little bluestem. Shrubs include sotol, cholla, yucca, Apache plume, mountain mahogany, shrub live oak, gambel oak, and alligator juniper. Wildlife includes elk, mule deer, Merriam's turkey, black bears, bobcats, coyotes, foxes, bald and golden eagles, prairie falcon, kestrel, hawks, and owls as well as Gambel's, scaled, and Mearn's quail.

The range contains important breeding ground for mountain lion and the southern portion is important for mountain lion connectivity. The Nature Conservancy identified the Datils as a key conservation area in New Mexico due to the range's ecological diversity and species richness.

Wildlife in the Datil Mountains
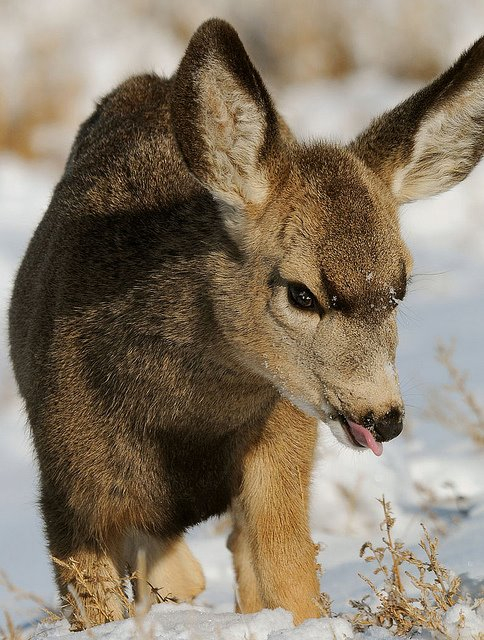
A mule deer fawn in the snow. Photo: US Forest Service.

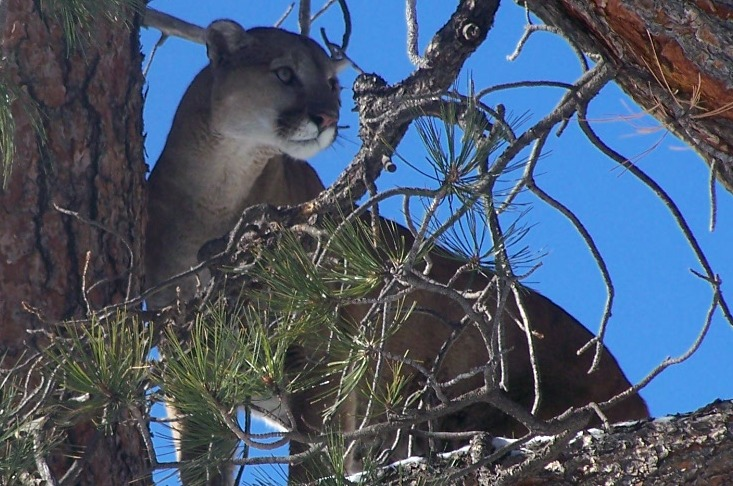
A mountain lion in the Cibola National Forest. Photo: US Forest Service.

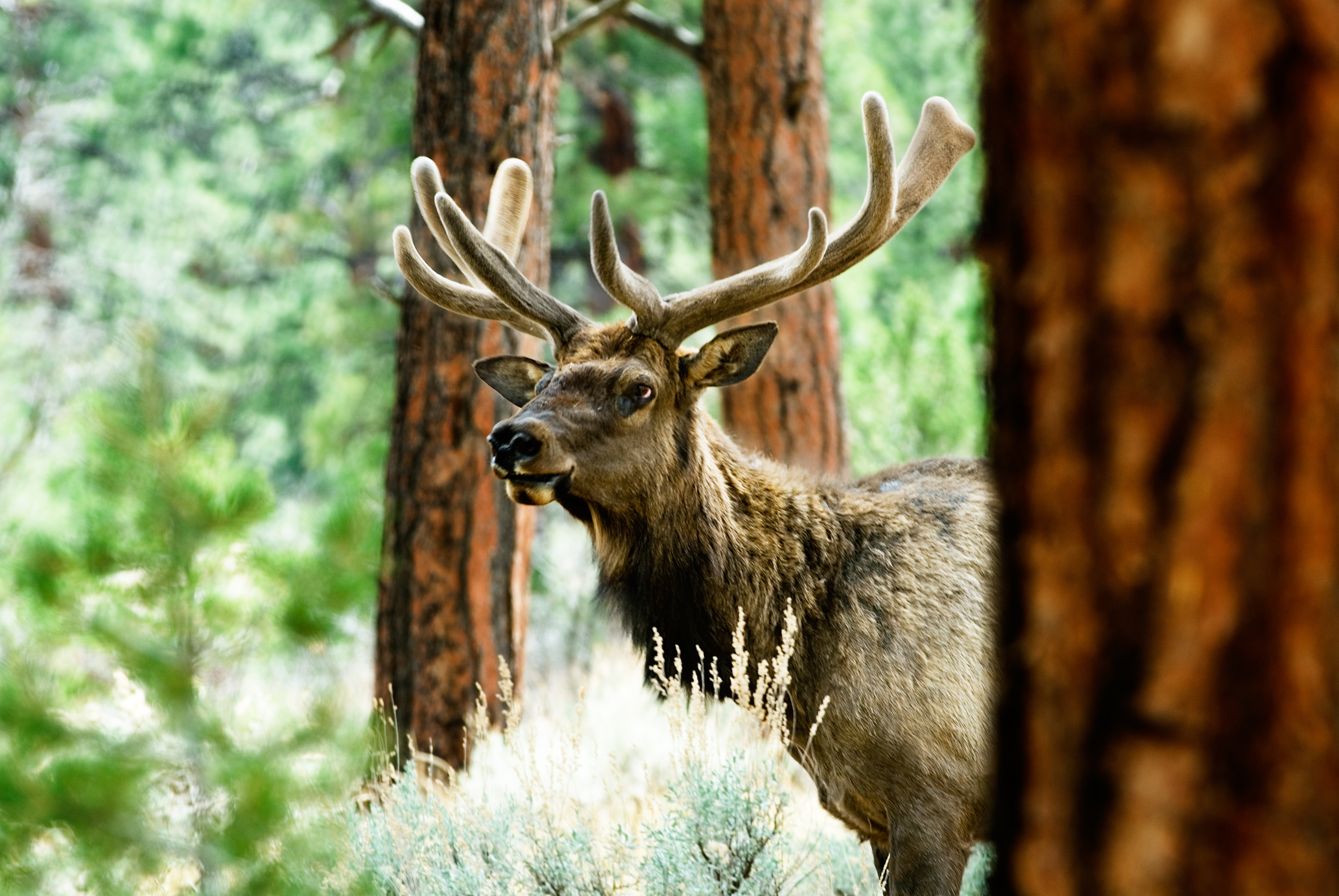
The Datil Mountains are home to elk. Photo: US Forest Service.

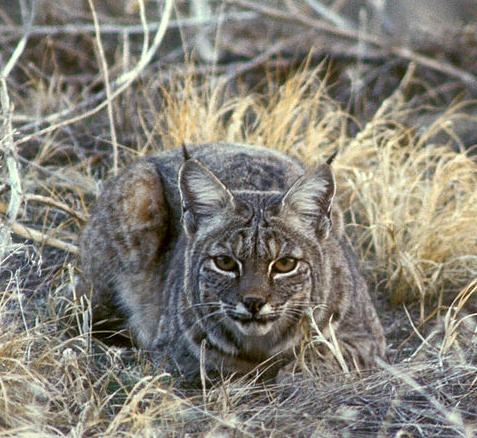
Bobcats live in the Datil Mountains. Photo: US Fish and Wildlife Service.

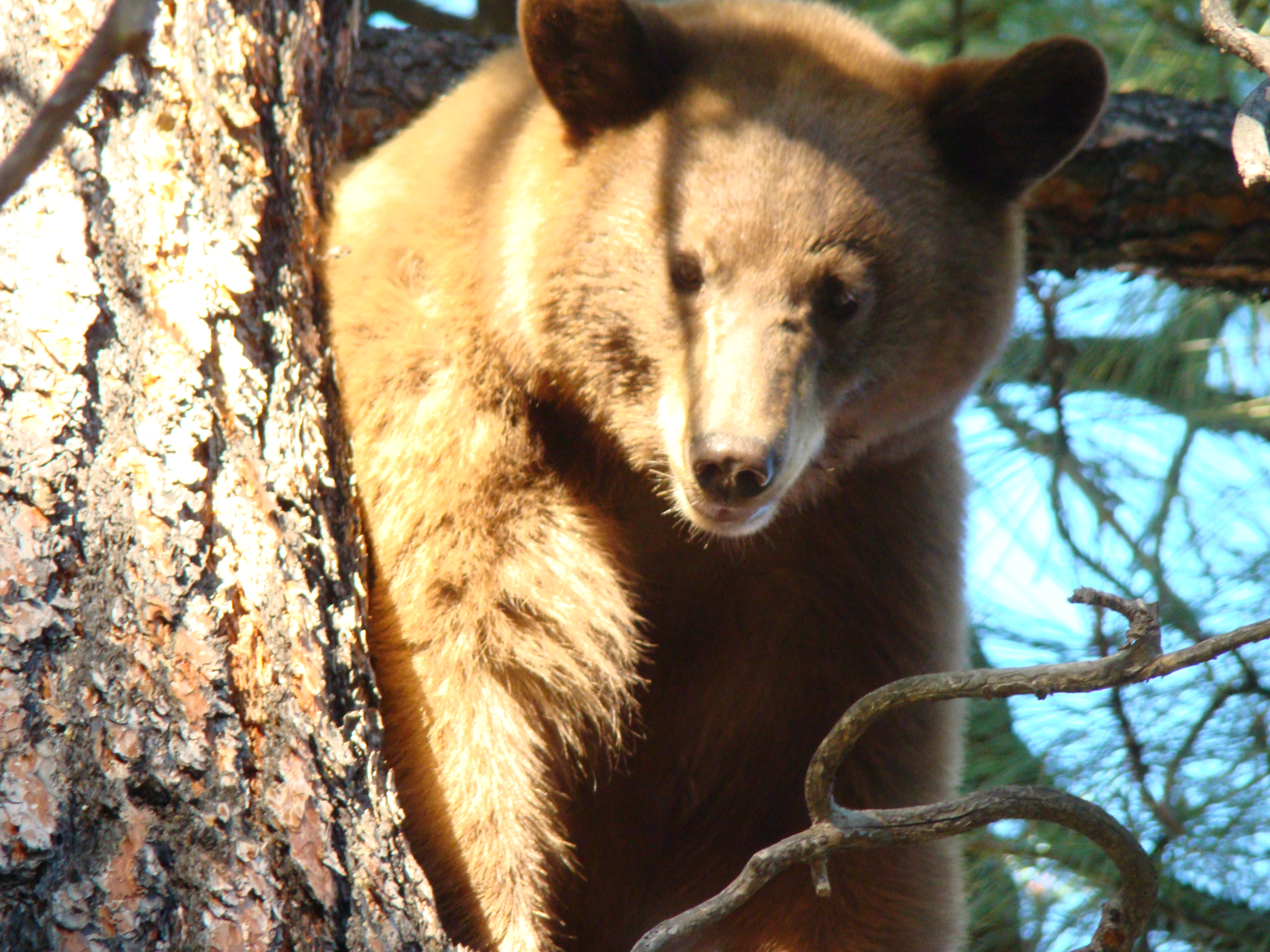
A black bear in Cibola National Forest. Photo: US Forest Service.

== Recreation ==
The Datil Mountains provide outstanding opportunities for hiking, camping, backpacking, hunting, rock climbing, horseback riding and other forms of primitive dispersed recreation given the natural and rugged character, high quality habitat, remarkable views, and size. Thompson Canyon features the challenging Enchanted Tower, and is a popular destination for rock climbers.
