= Pie Town, New Mexico =

- unincorporated community
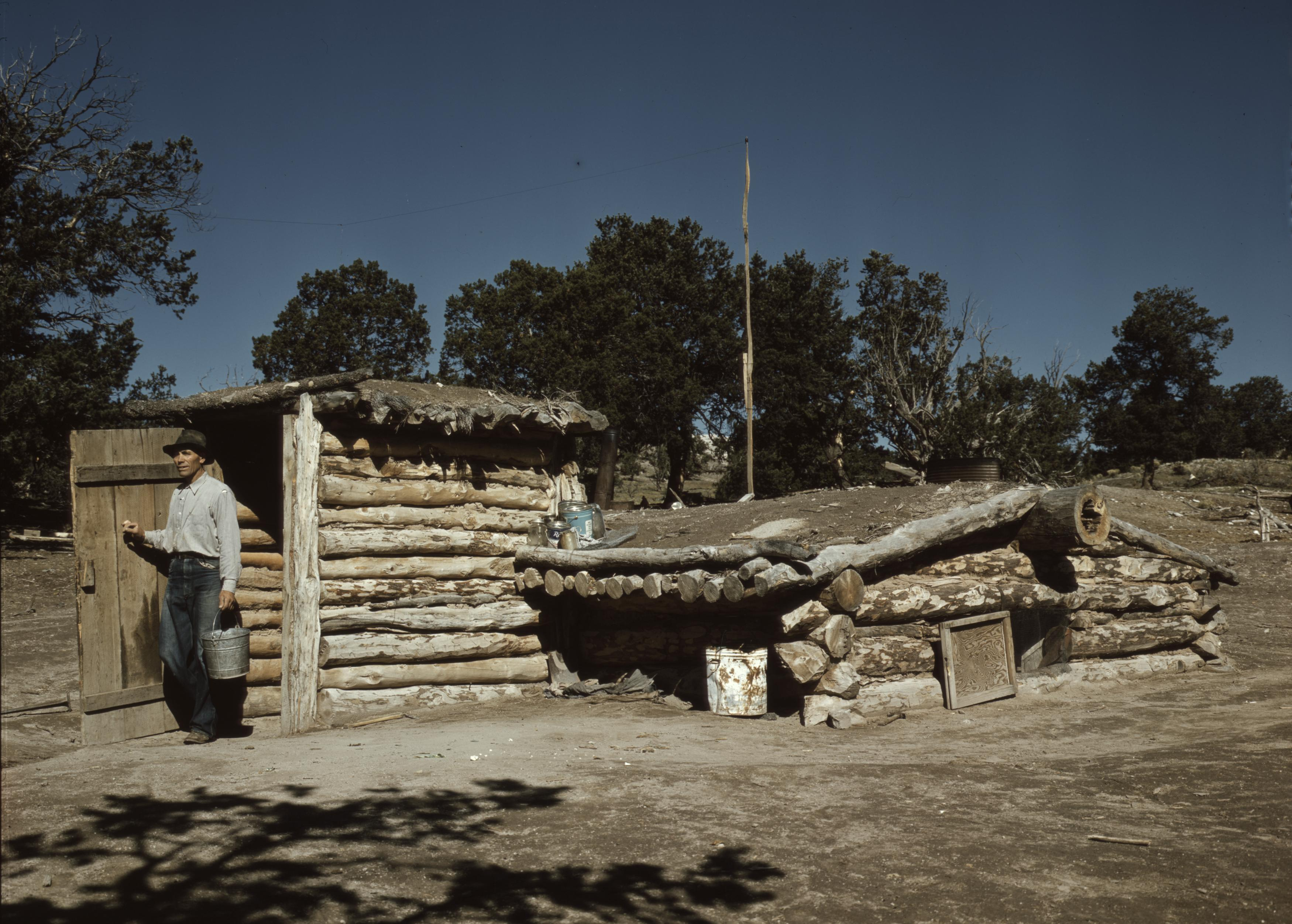
- Homesteader with dugout house in Pie Town, 1940 photograph by Russell Lee.
- Motto: America's Friendliest Little Town
- Location within New Mexico Pie Town (the United States)
- Coordinates: 34°20′24″N 108°10′15″W
- Country: United States
- State: New Mexico
- County: Catron County

Area
  - Total: 57.3 sq mi (148.4 km^{2})
  - Land: 57.3 sq mi (148.3 km^{2})
  - Water: 0.039 sq mi (0.1 km^{2})
- Elevation: 7,536 ft (2,297 m)

Population (2020)
  - Total: 111
  - Density: 3.4/sq mi (1.3/km^{2})
- Time zone: UTC−7 (MST)
  - Summer (DST): UTC−6 (MDT)
- ZIP Code: 87827
- Area code: 575
- GNIS feature ID: 2584176

Pie Town is an unincorporated community and census-designated place located along U.S. Highway 60 in Catron County, New Mexico. As of the 2020 census, Pie Town had a population of 166. Pie Town has been noted for its unusual name. Pie Town is the location of a "Pie Festival" on the second Saturday of each September. Pie Town is located immediately north of the Gila National Forest and not very far west of the Plains of San Agustin, the location of the Very Large Array radio telescope, which is also located along U.S. 60. In addition, one of the ten large radio antennas that form the Very Long Baseline Array of the National Radio Astronomy Observatory can be seen from U.S. 60, just east of Pie Town.

== Depictions in media ==
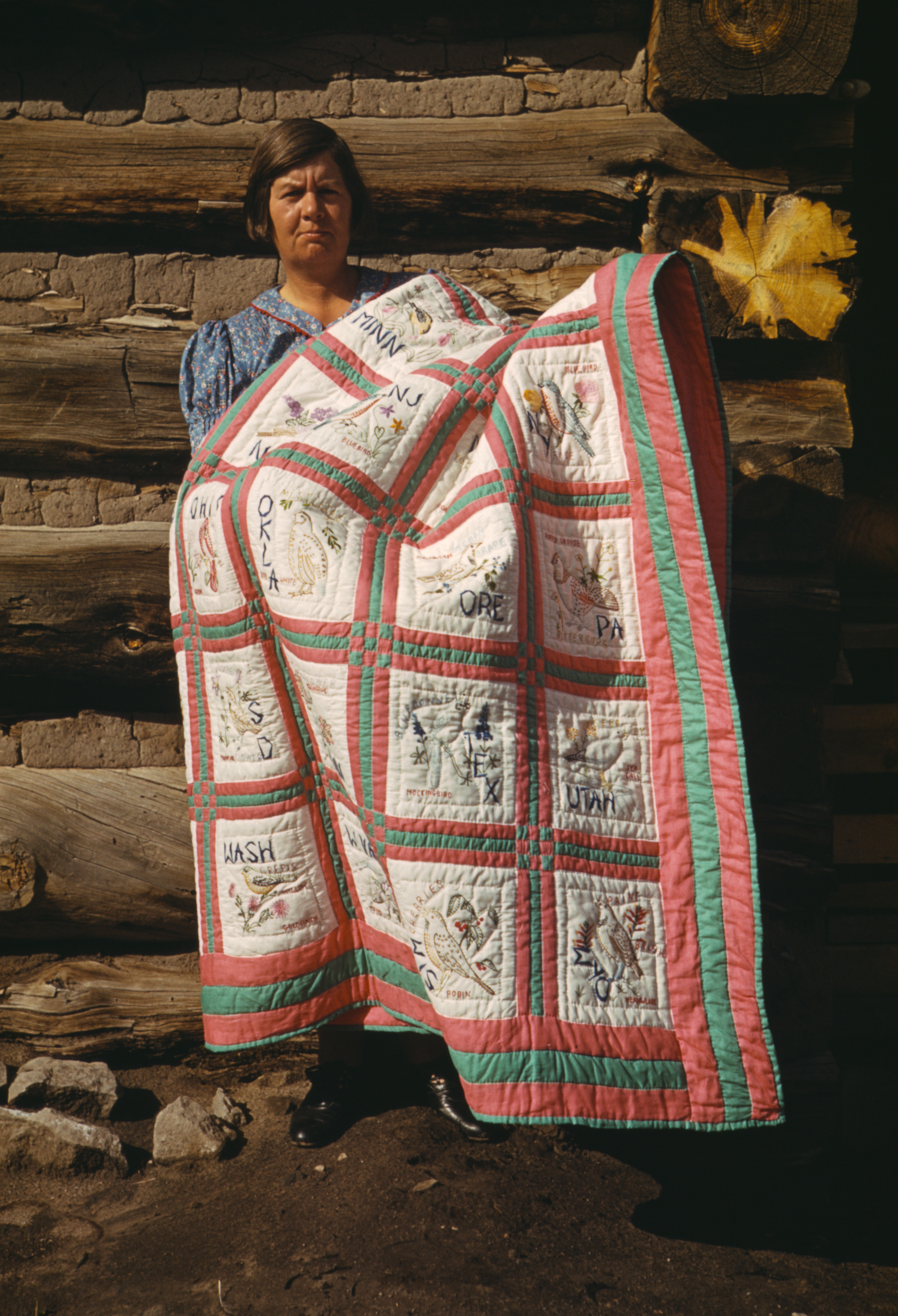
Mrs. Bill Stagg of Pie Town with state quilt, 1940, Russel Lee

Pie Town and its people were photographed in 1940 by Russell Lee, a photographer for the Farm Security Administration of the U.S. government. Pie Town, Lee's photos, and the local restaurant, the Daily Pie Cafe, were the subject of an article in Smithsonian magazine in February 2005. In 2014, a feature-length documentary, Pie Lady of Pie Town, was produced. CBS News Sunday Morning aired a story about the town in 2015.

== Education ==
The school district is Quemado Schools.

== Tourism ==
Pie Town is located along U.S. 60, 83 miles (134 km) west of Socorro and approximately 290 miles (470 km) east of Phoenix, Arizona. Albuquerque is 136 miles (219 km) to the northeast by other highways.

The center of Pie Town is 2 miles (3 km) west of where US 60 crosses the Continental Divide, and some visitors arrive by way of the Continental Divide Trail (CDT) that provides a respite between Silver City and Grants, New Mexico. For cyclists, equestrians, motorcyclists, and hikers, Pie Town provides a number of services, including lodging, supplies, and unique flavors of pie on request. In June 2007, three residents of Pie Town, Nita Larronde, Don Kearney, and Kathy Knapp, were awarded the Curry Trail Angel Award by the Adventure Cycling Association in recognition for their kindness and generosity.

The area of Pie Town is rich in relics of the Native Americans. Many Anasazi and Acoma pottery shards have been found in the area, along with grinding slicks, an ancient axe head, and petrified wood. Some fossilized bones have been found on the ground. The ruins of Native American communities, which consist of one to a few dozen structures, are found here.

The Pie Town Annual Pie Festival includes a pie-baking contest, games and races, music, food, and arts and crafts.

Alongside traditional events like pie-eating and pie-baking, the Pie Town Pie Festival features a horned toad racing tournament. Locals and tourists capture their own horned lizards (which are locally called toads). The competitors get the lizards from the surrounding high desert and register them for the race. Once registered, the race begins, and they cheer on the lizards as they sprint to the edges of a drawn circle.

== Gallery ==
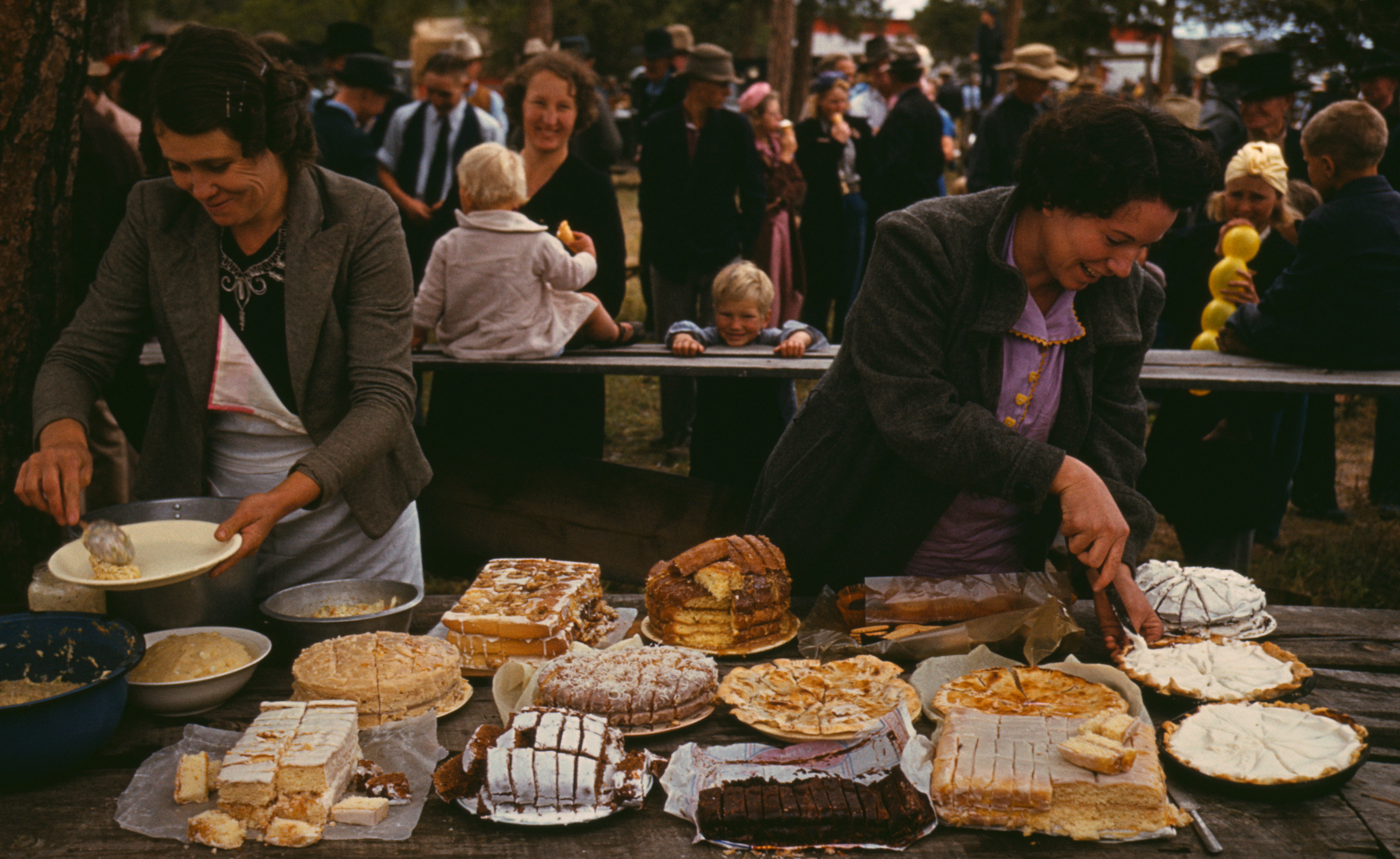
Serving food in Pie Town, 1940

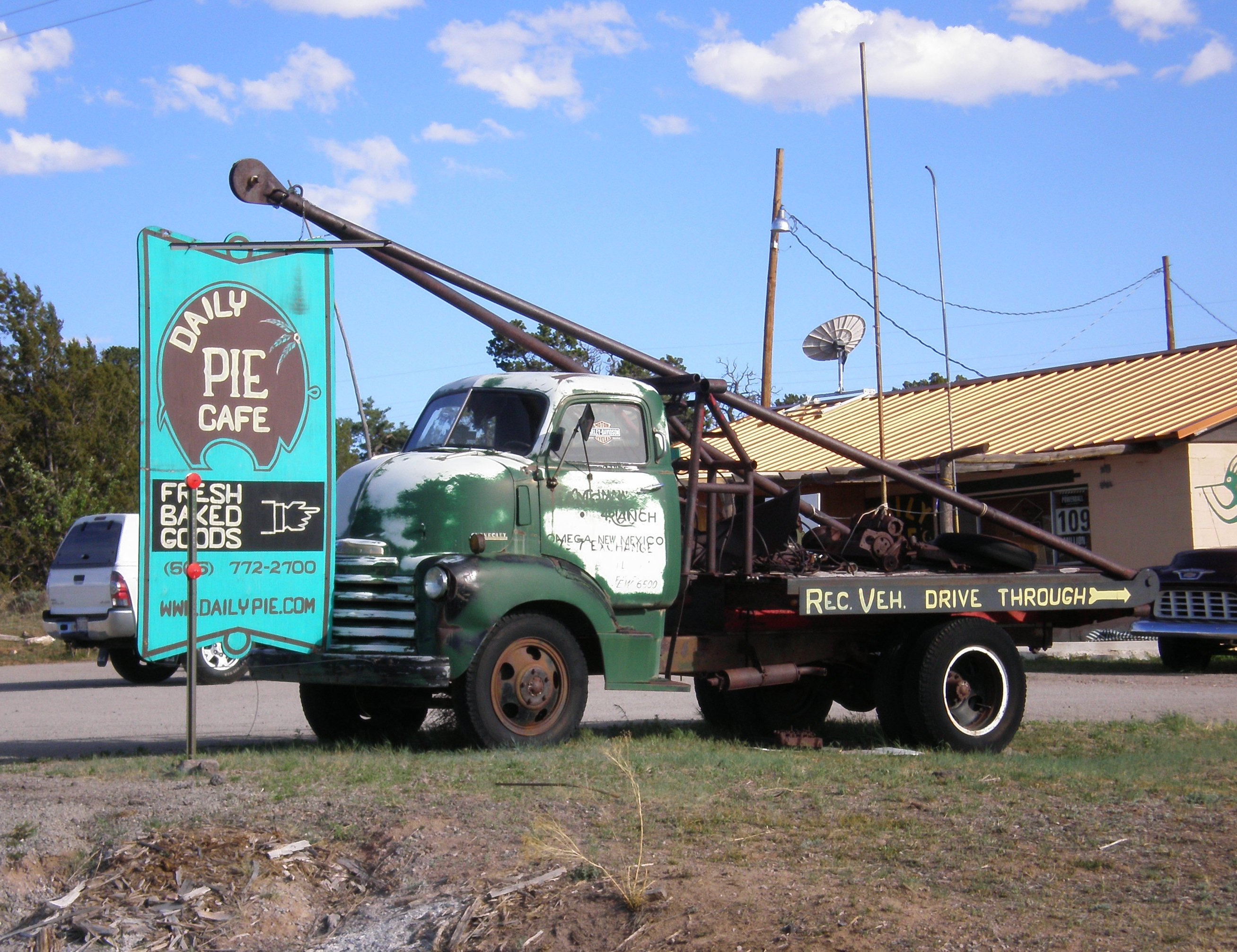
Daily Pie Cafe, May 2009

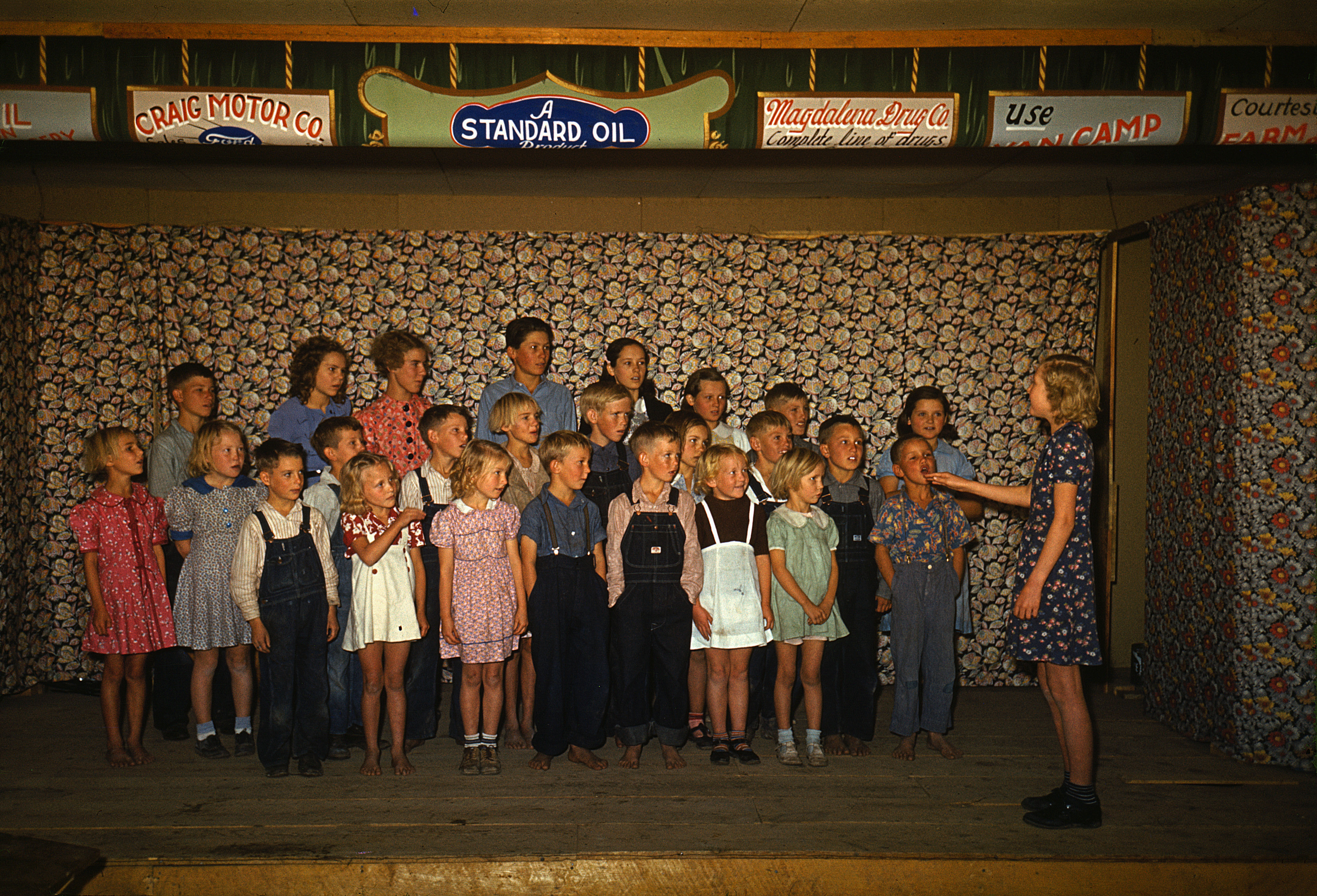
School children singing, 1940

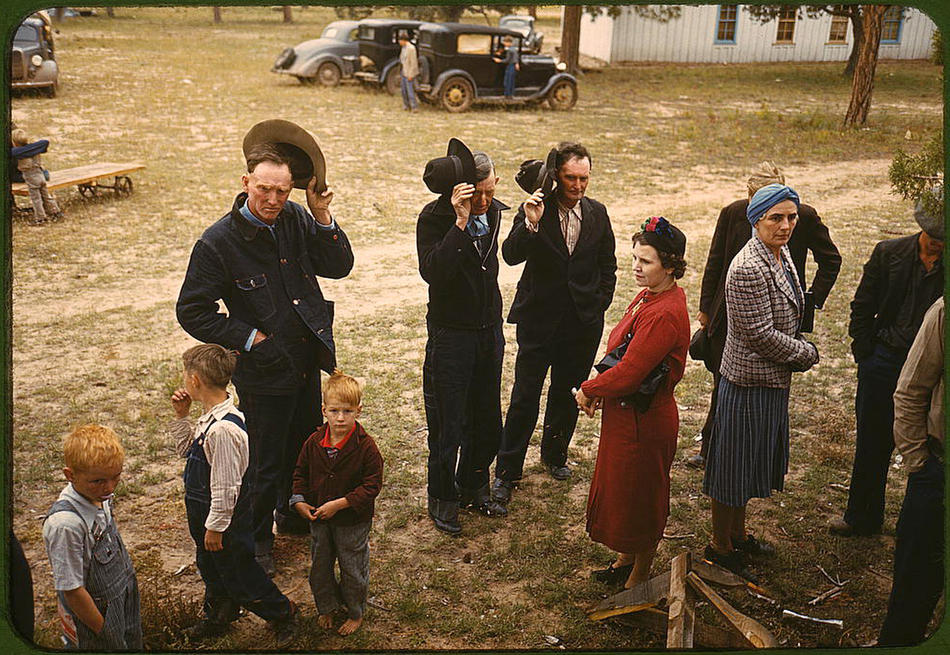
Saying grace before the barbeque dinner in Pie Town, 1940

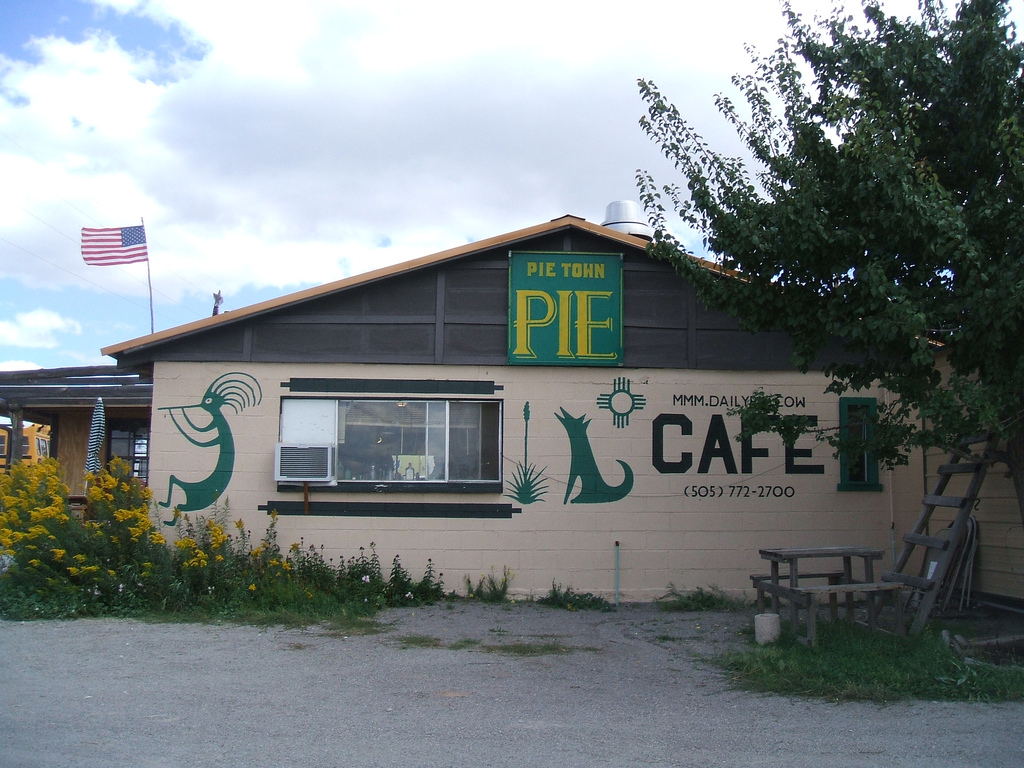
Pie Cafe in Pie Town (2006)

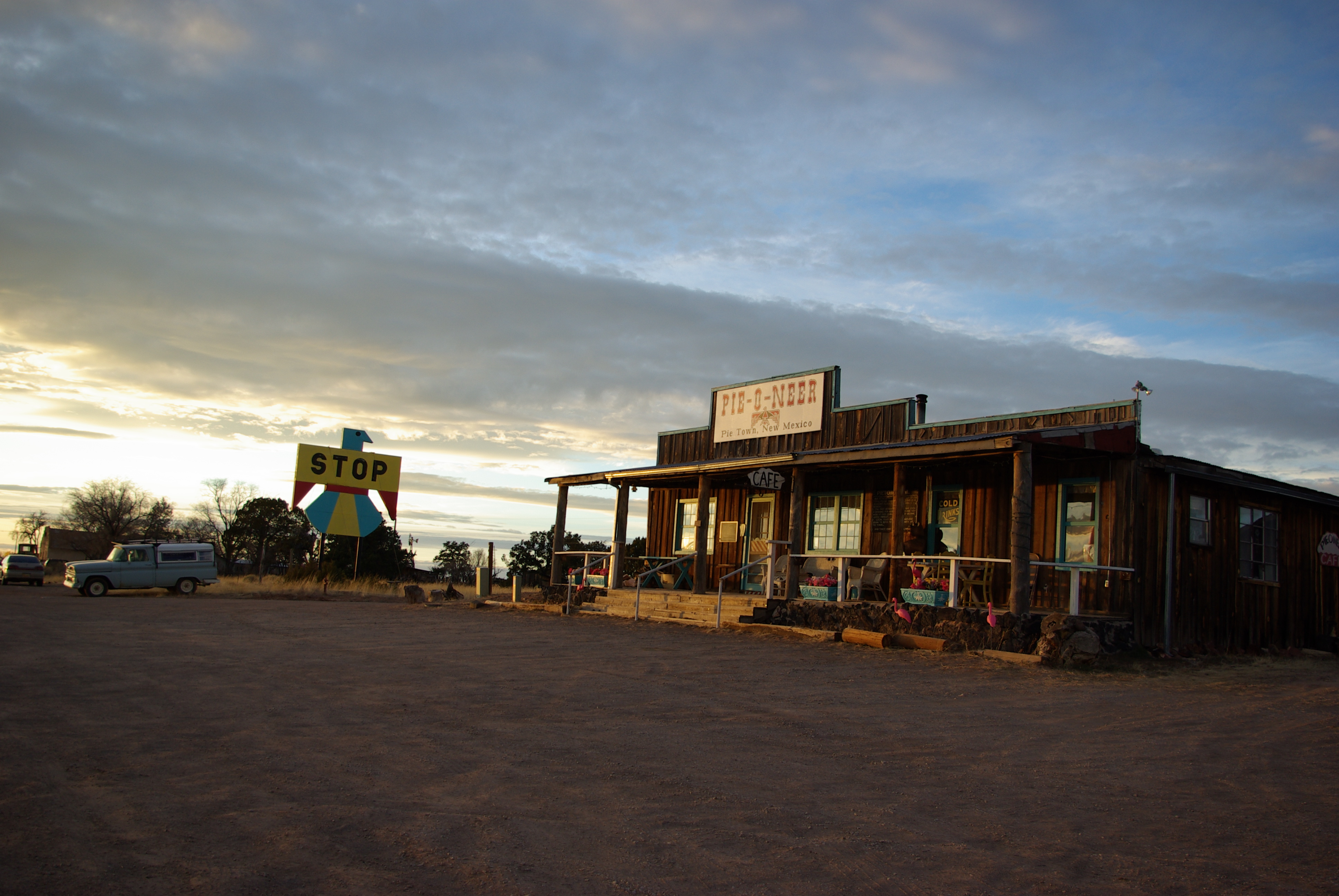
Pie-O-Neer Cafe in Pie Town 2007

== See also ==
- The Lightning Field, located near Pie Town. Tours meet in Quemado, NM
