= Ake Site =

Archaeological site in New Mexico, US

- U.S. National Register of Historic Places
- NM State Register of Cultural Properties
- Nearest city: Datil, New Mexico
- Area: 2.3 acres (0.93 ha)
- NRHP reference No.: 76001193
- NMSRCP No.: 424

Significant dates
- Added to NRHP: April 2, 1976
- Designated NMSRCP: December 19, 1975

The Ake Site is a name for a prehistoric archaeological location near the town of Datil in the San Augustine Basin of Catron County, New Mexico, United States. It was listed on the New Mexico Register of Cultural Properties in 1975, and listed on the National Register of Historic Places in 1976. The Ake Site is particularly important for the age and length of its use by prehistoric peoples. It has been dated during the Clovis period between 10,999 BC and 8000 BC, and during the Folsom period between 7999 BC and 5999 BC, making it among the oldest sites in the American Southwest.

Other sites around Ake are not as old, with the nearby Bat Cave dating from 4999 BC to 1000 BC and nearby pueblos dating from 1000 BC to 1000 AD.

== See also ==
- National Register of Historic Places listings in Catron County, New Mexico

== Bibliography ==
- Beckett, P.H. (1980) The Ake Site: Collection and Excavation of LA 13423, Catron County, New Mexico. New Mexico State University, Department of Sociology and Anthropology, Cultural Resources Management Division Report 357.
