= Big Burros National Forest =

Former national forest in New Mexico

Big Burros National Forest was established by the U.S. Forest Service in southwestern New Mexico on February 6, 1907, with 156,780 acres (634.5 km^{2}). On June 18, 1908, Big Burros was combined with Gila National Forest and the name was discontinued.

The lands presently form an isolated section of Gila National Forest, encompassing the Big Burro Mountains to the west of Silver City, New Mexico in the Silver City Ranger District.
