= Beverly Magennis =

Canadian ceramic sculptor (born 1942)

Beverley Magennis (born 1942) is a ceramic sculptor who works within the nexus of tile and architectural form.

== Early life ==
Born in Toronto, Beverley Magennis is a self-described feminist who covers architectural forms in ceramic tiles.

Magennis received her AOCA from the Ontario College of Art in Toronto in 1964 and received her MA in Ceramics from the Claremont Graduate School and University Center in California in 1968.

Magennis came to New Mexico in the 1970s as a part of Roswell's Artist-in-Residence program, and taught art in Chama, New Mexico.

== Career ==
She has worked in Los Angeles, where she was inspired by outsider artists, and throughout New Mexico, in Roswell, Albuquerque, and southwestern New Mexico. Magennis has tiled the interiors and exteriors of homes, including her own, with tiles, pennies, and mosaics, creating a "transformation of nonart materials into aestheticized objects." She also sculpts representational forms or repurposes commercial tiles which she fractures the tiles into abstract designs. She is well-known for her ceramic-tiled chairs, which usually include cats or birds, held in the collections of the New Mexico Museum of Art in Santa Fe, and the Albuquerque Museum of Art and History. She is noted for her quirky style fusing California modernism, breaking down barriers of high and low art through her tiled and mosaic artwork.

=== Literary career ===
After moving back to Albuquerque from Catron County, New Mexico, Beverley began writing a series of books, under the name Bev Magennis, about life in Catron County. The first book, Alibi Creek, was published by Torrey House Press in March 2016. Subsequent books comprise the series "Alibi Creek Tales" which includes "Desplazado," "Equity," "Nothing Fancy," and "Walker Walker."

== Works ==
Her home is considered an Albuquerque landmark, known as The Tile House, and was created during an 11-year period from the late 1980s to the early 1990s. It now belongs to Beverly's daughter, Erin Magennis, and her husband Kyle Ray, both artists carrying on the mosaic tradition. The mosaics on the exterior of the house includes over 150,000 tiles, as well as pennies, mirrors, cereal boxes, plastic straws, bottle caps, and cigarette lighters, in fractured rows and grids, modernizing the ancient technique of mosaic through a Warholian reuse of common materials. The interior of the house is governed by the same opportunistic reuse of materials, noted by visitors. The house is on the Cultural Registry of the City of Albuquerque.

The Dome Lady, which stands 26 feet tall, and around 19 feet wide is a guest house located in Apache Creek, New Mexico. With a concrete foundation, its skirt is reinforced with rebar concrete walls and the torso is constructed of metal lathe. The exterior is decorated in mosaic tile, with an entrance and windows. The torso is constructed has a bondo finish and is painted. The stucco interior contains a small kitchen, mosaic countertops, dining table, and sleeping quarters.

The 22 foot high mosaic sculpture, Tree of Life, created in 1999 and located at Fourth Street and Montano Rd. in North Valley, Albuquerque, New Mexico, is an artwork referencing the early peoples of Mexico and New Mexico, with black and white animal images referencing Native American Mimbres pottery, as well as color figures from the Maya culture.

Mexican Hat, installed in 1997 on the City and County Building in Albuquerque, New Mexico, is a black and white lithograph print with two boxes, one with flowers, the other with a Mexican sombrero done in an illustrative style.

The Full Circle, located in Zia Park, Albuquerque, New Mexico, dates to 1990, and is another great example of her public mosaic sculptural installation works. It incorporates a ceramic tiled round bench surrounded by a low ceramic tiled wall, with a rainbow motif and other whimsical Native American symbols and figure, integrating into the adjacent playgrounds and Zia Elementary School.

Untitled (Chairs), are held in the New Mexico Museum of Art in Santa Fe, and were created in 2000. They are ceramic mosaic on cement sculpture and installed outside the museum. The floral motifs integrate into the grassy courtyard in which they are installed; "combining seemingly naive subject matter with a sophisticated sense of design and quirky sense of humor."

Patio Chair with Black Cat, held in the Albuquerque Museum of Art and History, was created in 1999 and features her signature ceramic mosaic, heavy sculptural architectonic style, and decorative motifs.

The Parade, is a series of mosaic pillars installed at the University of New Mexico Hospital/1992

The Walkway, is a mosaic pathway at the Albuquerque Art Museum/1991

Alibi Creek, a novel about life in rural Catron County, New Mexico (March 2016)
