= Catron County, New Mexico =

County in New Mexico, United States

- County
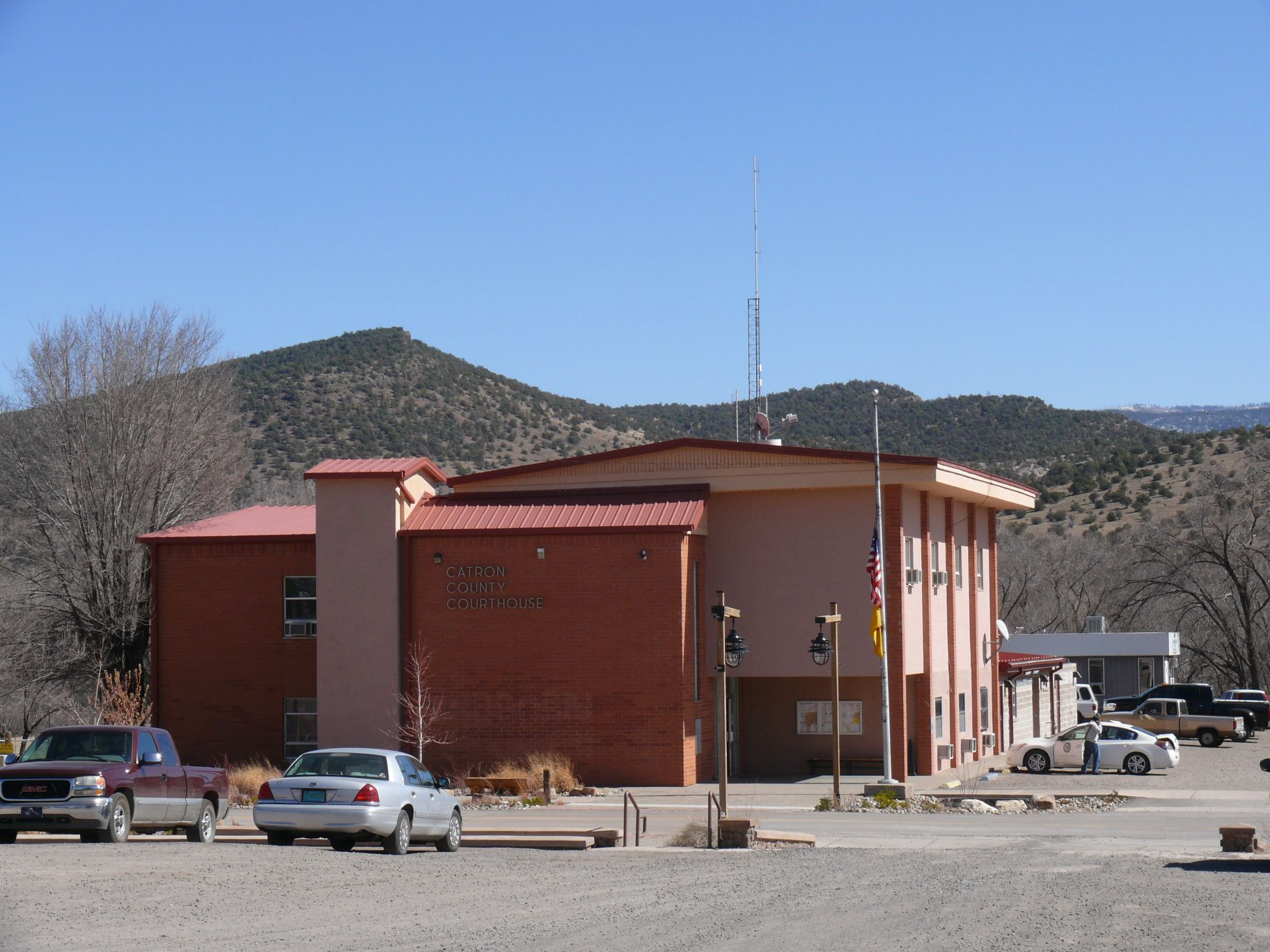
- Catron County Courthouse in Reserve

- Location within the U.S. state of New Mexico
- Coordinates: 33°55′N 108°25′W
- Country: United States
- State: New Mexico
- Founded: February 25, 1921
- Named for: Thomas B. Catron
- Seat: Reserve
- Largest village: Reserve

Area
  - Total: 6,929 sq mi (17,950 km^{2})
  - Land: 6,924 sq mi (17,930 km^{2})
  - Water: 5.5 sq mi (14 km^{2}) 0.08%

Population (2020)
  - Total: 3,579
  - Estimate (2025): 3,827 ▲
  - Density: 0.52/sq mi (0.20/km^{2})
- Time zone: UTC−7 (Mountain)
  - Summer (DST): UTC−6 (MDT)
- Congressional district: 2nd
- Website: www.catroncounty.us

Catron County is a county in the U.S. state of New Mexico. As of the 2020 census, the population was 3,579, making it New Mexico's third-least populous county. Its county seat is Reserve. Catron County is New Mexico's largest county by area.

== History ==
Human settlement in the Catron County region dates to some of the earliest in the Americas. During the Clovis period, between 10999 BC and 8000 BC, and Folsom period, between 7999 BC and 5999 BC, the Ake Site was occupied near Datil. Bat Cave, near Horse Springs, was occupied around 3,500 BC.

The Mimbres culture was expressed by the Mogollon people. They lived throughout the Catron County area from AD 1000 to 1130. Their art is renowned for its beauty.

In the 16th century, Spanish explorers and colonists came to the region, declaring it in 1598 to be part of Santa Fé de Nuevo México, a province of New Spain in the Americas. The province remained in Spanish control until Mexico gained independence in 1821. Under the 1824 Constitution of Mexico, this became the federally administered Territory of New Mexico.

Mexico ceded the region to the U.S. in the Treaty of Guadalupe Hidalgo in 1848 after being defeated in the Mexican–American War. In 1849, President Zachary Taylor proposed that New Mexico, including this region, immediately be admitted as a state in order to sidestep political conflict over the expansion of slavery in the territories. That did not happen. European-American settlers from the southern and eastern states began to arrive here, including some with enslaved African Americans. The territory did not become a state until 1912, long after the Civil War and abolition of slavery.

In 1880, Sergeant James C. Cooney was the first person to find silver and gold ore in the mountains of Catron County. He was reportedly killed by Chiricahua Apache led by Victorio that year, in what the European Americans called the "Alma Massacre". His remains are buried at Cooney's Tomb.

The foothills and canyons provided many hiding places for Apache warriors as they continued to resist American encroachment. During this time Cochise was another well-known Chiricahua leader. Noted war chief Goyaałé (Geronimo) had several hideouts in the county. Later in 1880, Buffalo Soldiers led by Sergeant George Jordan defeated Chiricahua Apache warriors led by Victorio in the Battle of Fort Tularosa. Four years later, self-appointed sheriff Elfego Baca was the hero of the so-called Frisco shootout in San Francisco Plaza.

The country also attracted European-American outlaws. In the mid-1880s Butch Cassidy and his Wild Bunch gang holed up at a ranch near Alma. Notorious outlaw Tom Ketchum also lived in Catron County around this time.

Socorro County included all of Catron County's territory from the creation of Santa Fé de Nuevo México until 1921. At that time, Catron County was organized and named for Thomas B. Catron, a leading figure in New Mexico statehood and its first US senator. In 1927, the State Legislature attempted to abolish both Socorro and Catron in order to create a new Rio Grande County. A court suit voided this act, and the two counties retained their independence.

The Lightning Field, an art installation on the open earth, brought national attention to Quemado in this county in the late 1970s.

== Geography ==
According to the U.S. Census Bureau, the county has a total area of 6,929 square miles (17,950 km^{2}), of which 6,924 square miles (17,930 km^{2}) is land and 5.5 square miles (14 km^{2}) (0.08%) is water.

Catron County is the largest county, by area, in New Mexico. At almost 7,000 square miles (18,000 km^{2}), Catron County is larger than each of the three smallest U.S. states. With a population of only 3,400 people, the county is as sparsely populated as many an old West frontier area. The elk population at some 12,000 head, is much larger than the sparse human population.

There are no stoplights in the county. Cattle ranching is a major industry. Grey Wolves, which were hunted to near extinction in the twentieth century, have been reintroduced and are now considered a pest by cattle ranchers.

Within the boundaries of Catron County lie parts of the Gila National Forest, the Apache National Forest and the Cibola National Forest. The establishment of these national forests, in the past called "forest reserves," led to the name Reserve being given to a village on the San Francisco River, which also serves as the County Seat. There are no stop lights in the whole county, so when license tests are given in Reserve, an artificial portable stop light is set up in a parking lot.

Bordering Arizona, Catron County affords the shortest route between Albuquerque and Phoenix or Tucson. Reserve can also be reached by following U.S. Route 180 north from Silver City and New Mexico State Road 12 east for a total of 99 miles (159 km).

In Catron County there is a volcanic area that until recently contained sufficient heat to cause steam to rise after a slight rain. It is called Burning Mountain and appears to have been used by the Apache for healing purposes. The county is home to the Red Hill Volcanic Field as well as the Plains of San Agustin.

=== Mountains ===
- Black Mountain
- Black Range
- Datil Mountains
- Diablo Range
- Gallo Mountains
- Mangas Mountains
- Mogollon Mountains
- Saliz Mountains
- San Francisco Mountains
- Tularosa Mountains
- Whitewater Baldy

=== Bodies of water ===
- San Francisco River
- Tularosa River
- Rio Salado
- Middle Fork Hot Springs
- Jordan Hot Springs (New Mexico)
- Turkey Creek Hot Springs
- Quemado Lake
- Zuni Salt Lake

=== Forests ===
- Apache-Sitgreaves National Forest
- Blue Range Wilderness
- Cibola National Forest
- Gila Wilderness
- Gila National Forest
- Whitewater Canyon National Forest Recreation Area

=== Adjacent counties ===
- Cibola County - north
- Socorro County - east
- Sierra County - southeast
- Grant County - south
- Greenlee County, Arizona - west
- Apache County, Arizona - west

=== National protected areas ===
- Apache National Forest (part)
- Cibola National Forest (part)
- Gila Cliff Dwellings National Monument
- Gila National Forest (part)

== Demographics ==
Historical population
Census	Pop.	Note	%±
1930	3,282		—
1940	4,881		48.7%
1950	3,533		−27.6%
1960	2,773		−21.5%
1970	2,198		−20.7%
1980	2,720		23.7%
1990	2,563		−5.8%
2000	3,543		38.2%
2010	3,725		5.1%
2020	3,579		−3.9%
2025 (est.)	3,827	▲	6.9%
U.S. Decennial Census; 1790–1960 1900–1990; 1990–2000 2010

=== 2020 census ===
As of the 2020 census, the county had a population of 3,579. The median age was 61.9 years. 10.1% of residents were under the age of 18 and 43.3% of residents were 65 years of age or older. For every 100 females there were 110.4 males, and for every 100 females age 18 and over there were 111.4 males age 18 and over.

The racial makeup of the county was 82.7% White, 1.0% Black or African American, 1.6% American Indian and Alaska Native, 0.2% Asian, 0.0% Native Hawaiian and Pacific Islander, 4.3% from some other race, and 10.1% from two or more races. Hispanic or Latino residents of any race comprised 16.8% of the population.

Catron County, New Mexico – Racial and ethnic composition Note: the US Census treats Hispanic/Latino as an ethnic category. This table excludes Latinos from the racial categories and assigns them to a separate category. Hispanics/Latinos may be of any race.
Race / Ethnicity (NH = Non-Hispanic)	Pop 2000	Pop 2010	Pop 2020	% 2000	% 2010	% 2020
White alone (NH)	2,687	2,832	2,738	75.84%	76.03%	76.50%
Black or African American alone (NH)	9	15	35	0.25%	0.40%	0.98%
Native American or Alaska Native alone (NH)	66	87	47	1.86%	2.34%	1.31%
Asian alone (NH)	23	5	8	0.65%	0.13%	0.22%
Pacific Islander alone (NH)	0	0	0	0.00%	0.00%	0.00%
Other race alone (NH)	8	10	37	0.23%	0.27%	1.03%
Mixed race or Multiracial (NH)	71	67	112	2.00%	1.80%	3.13%
Hispanic or Latino (any race)	679	709	602	19.16%	19.03%	16.82%
Total	3,543	3,725	3,579	100.00%	100.00%	100.00%

0.0% of residents lived in urban areas, while 100.0% lived in rural areas.

There were 1,835 households in the county, of which 11.4% had children under the age of 18 living with them and 22.8% had a female householder with no spouse or partner present. About 39.1% of all households were made up of individuals and 24.7% had someone living alone who was 65 years of age or older.

There were 3,231 housing units, of which 43.2% were vacant. Among occupied housing units, 85.2% were owner-occupied and 14.8% were renter-occupied. The homeowner vacancy rate was 4.6% and the rental vacancy rate was 9.6%.

=== 2010 census ===
As of the 2010 census, there were 3,725 people, 1,787 households, and 1,080 families living in the county. The population density was 0.5 inhabitants per square mile (0.19 inhabitants/km^{2}). There were 3,289 housing units at an average density of 0.5 units per square mile (0.19 units/km^{2}). The racial makeup of the county was 89.8% white, 2.7% American Indian, 0.4% black or African American, 0.2% Asian, 3.8% from other races, and 3.1% from two or more races. Those of Hispanic or Latino origin made up 19.0% of the population.

The largest ancestry groups were:

- 29.1% American
- 18.8% English
- 17.5% German
- 10.4% Mexican
- 9.8% Irish
- 5.1% Spanish
- 3.3% Scottish
- 2.3% Scotch-Irish
- 2.1% Navajo
- 1.8% Swedish
- 1.8% Welsh
- 1.7% Danish
- 1.2% Dutch
- 1.1% Italian
- 1.1% Norwegian

Of the 1,787 households, 16.4% had children under the age of 18 living with them, 52.2% were married couples living together, 4.8% had a female householder with no husband present, 39.6% were non-families, and 34.8% of all households were made up of individuals. The average household size was 2.03 and the average family size was 2.57. The median age was 55.8 years.

The median income for a household in the county was $31,914 and the median income for a family was $40,906. Males had a median income of $46,304 versus $23,325 for females. The per capita income for the county was $20,895. About 10.1% of families and 15.3% of the population were below the poverty line, including 31.5% of those under age 18 and 12.0% of those age 65 or over.

=== 2000 census ===
As of the 2000 census of 2000, there were 3,543 people, 1,584 households, and 1,040 families living in the county. The population density was 0.51 people per square mile (0.20 people/km^{2}). There were 2,548 housing units at an average density of 0.37 units per square mile (0.14/km^{2}). The racial makeup of the county was 87.75% White, 0.28% Black or African American, 2.20% Native American, 0.68% Asian, 0.06% Pacific Islander, 5.42% from other races, and 3.61% from two or more races. 19.16% of the population were Hispanic or Latino of any race.

There were 1,584 households, out of which 22.30% had children under the age of 18 living with them, 55.40% were married couples living together, 7.60% had a female householder with no husband present, and 34.30% were non-families. 30.10% of all households were made up of individuals, and 11.40% had someone living alone who was 65 years of age or older. The average household size was 2.23 and the average family size was 2.75.

In the county, the population was spread out, with 21.10% under the age of 18, 4.20% from 18 to 24, 19.50% from 25 to 44, 36.40% from 45 to 64, and 18.80% who were 65 years of age or older. The median age was 48 years. For every 100 females there were 104.70 males. For every 100 females age 18 and over, there were 101.70 males.

The median income for a household in the county was $23,892, and the median income for a family was $30,742. Males had a median income of $26,064 versus $18,315 for females. The per capita income for the county was $13,951. About 17.40% of families and 24.50% of the population were below the poverty line, including 39.60% of those under age 18 and 14.90% of those age 65 or over.

== Points of interest ==
- Ake Site - A prehistoric archaeological location near the town of Datil in the San Augustine Basin, it has been dated during the Clovis period between 10999 BC 8000 BC, and during the Folsom period between 7999BC and 5999 BC, making it among the oldest inhabited sites in the American Southwest.
- Bat Cave - Formed by ancient wave, the cave was covered by an inland sea 35 miles long and 165 feet deep 15,000 years ago. In the late 1940s and early 50s, archeologists found stone artifacts of human inhabitation spanning 5,000 years. In 1948 and 1950, evidence, as early as 3600 BCE, for popping corn, as ears of popcorn, were discovered by Harvard anthropology graduate student Herbert W. Dick and Harvard botany graduate student Earle Smith, in the "Bat Cave" complex of rock shelters, and attributed to the Ancestral Puebloan peoples, who maintained trade networks with peoples in tropical Mexico.
- Bearwallow Mountain Lookout Cabins and Shed - Built in 1940 by the Works Progress Administration, they are one of three New Deal-era buildings in the Gila National Forest.
- Black Mountain Lookout Cabin
- Catwalk National Recreation Trail - A remnant of a water system for the former mining town of Graham, as many as 29,000 visitors a year walk on the Catwalk's trail or picnic at the mouth of the canyon.
- Continental Divide Trail - A section of the trail passes through the county starting northeast of Silver City, before going through the Gila Wilderness and exiting north of Pie Town. In an unaffiliated poll, the Gila Wilderness section was ranked third among the favorite sections of the CDT by hikers in 2019.
- Pie Town - A hiker and biker-friendly hamlet on the trail with a hostel (the "Toaster House") supported by hiker's donations and a restaurant which serves pie.
- Cooney's Tomb - Located on the outskirts of Alma and near the ghost town of Cooney, Cooney's Tomb is a large boulder beside the road. It marks the burial location of James C. Cooney, a miner in the area who was killed by Apaches in 1880.
- El Caso Lookout Complex - Built in 1934 by the Works Progress Administration, the complex was one of three New Deal-era forest fire lookouts built in Catron County.
- Mangas Mountain Lookout Complex
- Mogollon Historic District - The site of many historic buildings, Mogollon was a successful mining town until the turn of the 20th century.
- Mogollon Baldy Lookout Cabin
- The Lightning Field - A 640-acre art installation by Walter De Maria. Commissioned and maintained by Dia Art Foundation
- Tularosa River Site and Tularosa Ranger Station - A collection of more than 500 petroglyphs and a historic US Forest Service ranger station dating to the 1920s.
- Zuni Salt Lake and Sanctuary - The Pueblo people of the Southwest have made annual pilgrimages to Zuñi Salt Lake to harvest salt, for both culinary and ceremonial purposes for thousands of years. Ancient roadways radiate out from the lake to the various pueblos and ancient pueblo sites.

== Politics ==
Catron County is overwhelmingly Republican, last voting for a Democratic presidential candidate in 1964.

United States presidential election results for Catron County, New Mexico
Year	Republican		Democratic		Third party(ies)	
Year	No.	%	No.	%	No.	%
1924	499	47.30%	418	39.62%	138	13.08%
1928	774	64.77%	420	35.15%	1	0.08%
1932	610	37.94%	972	60.45%	26	1.62%
1936	798	35.12%	1,456	64.08%	18	0.79%
1940	949	47.74%	1,039	52.26%	0	0.00%
1944	699	54.23%	589	45.69%	1	0.08%
1948	521	44.42%	648	55.24%	4	0.34%
1952	741	61.49%	464	38.51%	0	0.00%
1956	711	59.85%	477	40.15%	0	0.00%
1960	671	53.90%	573	46.02%	1	0.08%
1964	584	48.34%	624	51.66%	0	0.00%
1968	674	62.29%	278	25.69%	130	12.01%
1972	829	73.49%	271	24.02%	28	2.48%
1976	602	53.18%	517	45.67%	13	1.15%
1980	906	62.74%	466	32.27%	72	4.99%
1984	970	68.55%	418	29.54%	27	1.91%
1988	925	62.25%	490	32.97%	71	4.78%
1992	771	49.65%	465	29.94%	317	20.41%
1996	923	60.56%	423	27.76%	178	11.68%
2000	1,273	74.40%	353	20.63%	85	4.97%
2004	1,427	71.60%	551	27.65%	15	0.75%
2008	1,398	66.19%	664	31.44%	50	2.37%
2012	1,494	70.37%	560	26.38%	69	3.25%
2016	1,464	71.45%	427	20.84%	158	7.71%
2020	1,698	73.00%	595	25.58%	33	1.42%
2024	1,752	74.33%	571	24.23%	34	1.44%

== Communities ==
=== Village ===
- Reserve (county seat)

=== Census-designated places ===
- Alma
- Apache Creek
- Aragon
- Cruzville
- Datil
- Escudilla Bonita
- Glenwood
- Homestead
- Lower Frisco
- Luna
- Middle Frisco
- Mogollon
- Pie Town
- Pleasanton
- Quemado
- Rancho Grande
- Rivers

=== Unincorporated communities ===
- Old Horse Springs
- San Francisco Plaza

== Education ==
School districts include:

- Quemado Independent Schools
- Reserve Independent Schools

== Notable people ==
- Elfego Baca, sheriff and folk hero
- Agnes Morley Cleaveland, writer and cattle rancher
- Jerry D. Thompson, historian of the American Southwest, American Civil War, and Texas, was reared in Quemado in Catron County.
- Beverly Magennis, tile artist, author

== Transportation ==
=== Major highways ===
- US 60
- US 180
- NM 12
- NM 15
- NM 32
- NM 36
- NM 59
- NM 103
- NM 159
- NM 163
- NM 174
- NM 435
- NM 601
- NM 603

== See also ==
- National Register of Historic Places listings in Catron County, New Mexico
