= Old Horse Springs, New Mexico =

- Unincorporated community
- Location within the state of New Mexico Old Horse Springs (the United States)
- Coordinates: 33°55′28″N 108°13′40″W
- Country: United States
- State: New Mexico
- County: Catron
- Elevation: 6,982 ft (2,128 m)

Population (2000)
  - Total: 0
- Time zone: UTC-5 (Mountain (MST))
  - Summer (DST): MDT
- Area code: 575
- GNIS feature ID: 909340

Old Horse Springs is an unincorporated community in Catron County, New Mexico, United States. It is 20 miles northeast of Aragon and 20 miles west of Datil. To the west of Horse Springs is the Continental Divide, then South to the Plains of San Agustin.

== History ==
Old Horse Springs had a post office from 1879 to 1882. The town's name originated when soldiers traveling from Fort Tularosa to Socorro lost a horse. Apparently they found it at the natural hot springs approximately ½ mile west of the settlement. The original community of Horse Springs is now labeled Old Horse Springs and is two miles west of New Horse Springs.
