= Gila National Forest =

Protected area in New Mexico, US

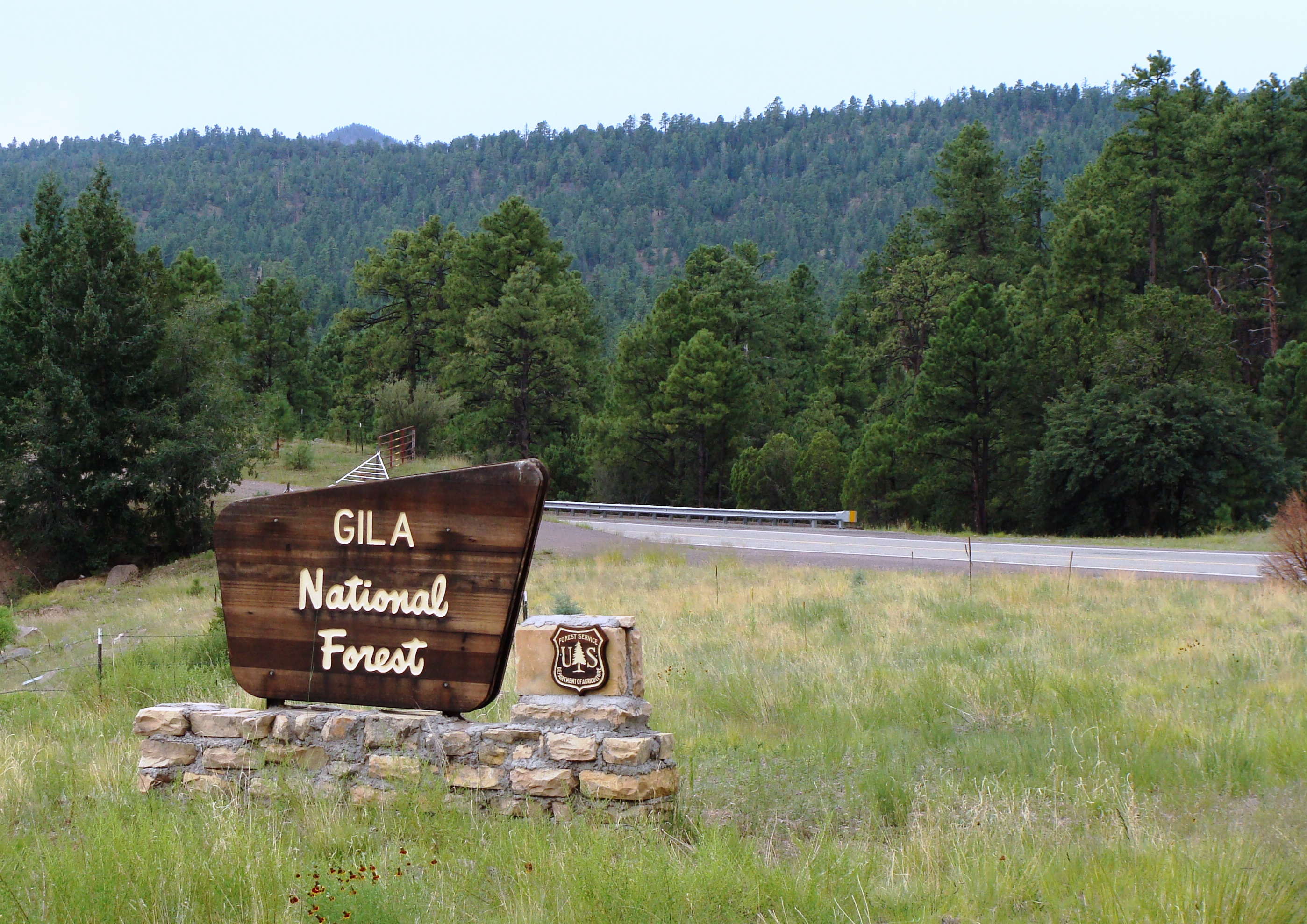
- Gila National Forest along New Mexico Route 180

- Location within the United States
- Location: New Mexico, United States
- Nearest city: Silver City, NM
- Coordinates: 33.47°N 108.53°W
- Area: 2,710,659 acres (10,969.65 km^{2})
- Established: July 21, 1905
- Governing body: U.S. Forest Service
- Website: Gila National Forest

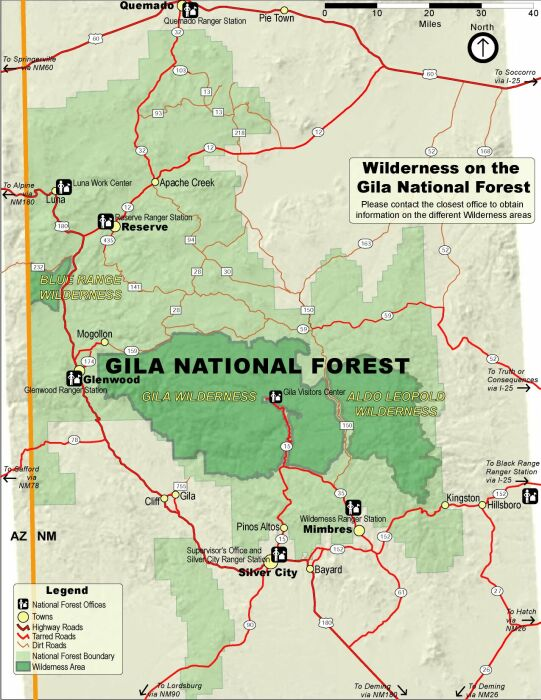
Map of wilderness areas in the Gila National Forest

The Gila National Forest is a United States national forest in New Mexico. Established in 1905, it now covers approximately 2,710,659 acres (10,969.65 km^{2}), making it the sixth largest national forest in the continental United States. The Forest administration also manage the part of the Apache National Forest in New Mexico which covers 614,202 acres for a total of 3.3 million acres managed by the Gila National Forest. Within the forest, the Gila Wilderness was established in 1924 as the US's first designated wilderness. The Aldo Leopold Wilderness and Blue Range Wilderness are also found within its borders. The Blue Range Primitive Area lies within Arizona in the neighboring Apache National Forest.

== Geography ==
The forest lies in southern Catron, northern Grant, western Sierra, and extreme northeastern Hidalgo counties in southwestern New Mexico. Forest headquarters are located in Silver City, New Mexico. There are local ranger district offices in Glenwood, Mimbres, Quemado, Reserve, Silver City, and Truth or Consequences. The Gila Cliff Dwellings National Monument is located with the Catron County section of the forest.

The forest's terrain ranges from rugged mountains and deep canyons to mesas and semi-desert. Due to the extremely rugged terrain, the area is largely unspoiled. There are several hot springs in Gila National Forest, including Middle Fork Hot Springs, Jordan Hot Springs, and Turkey Creek Hot Springs.

== Wildlife ==
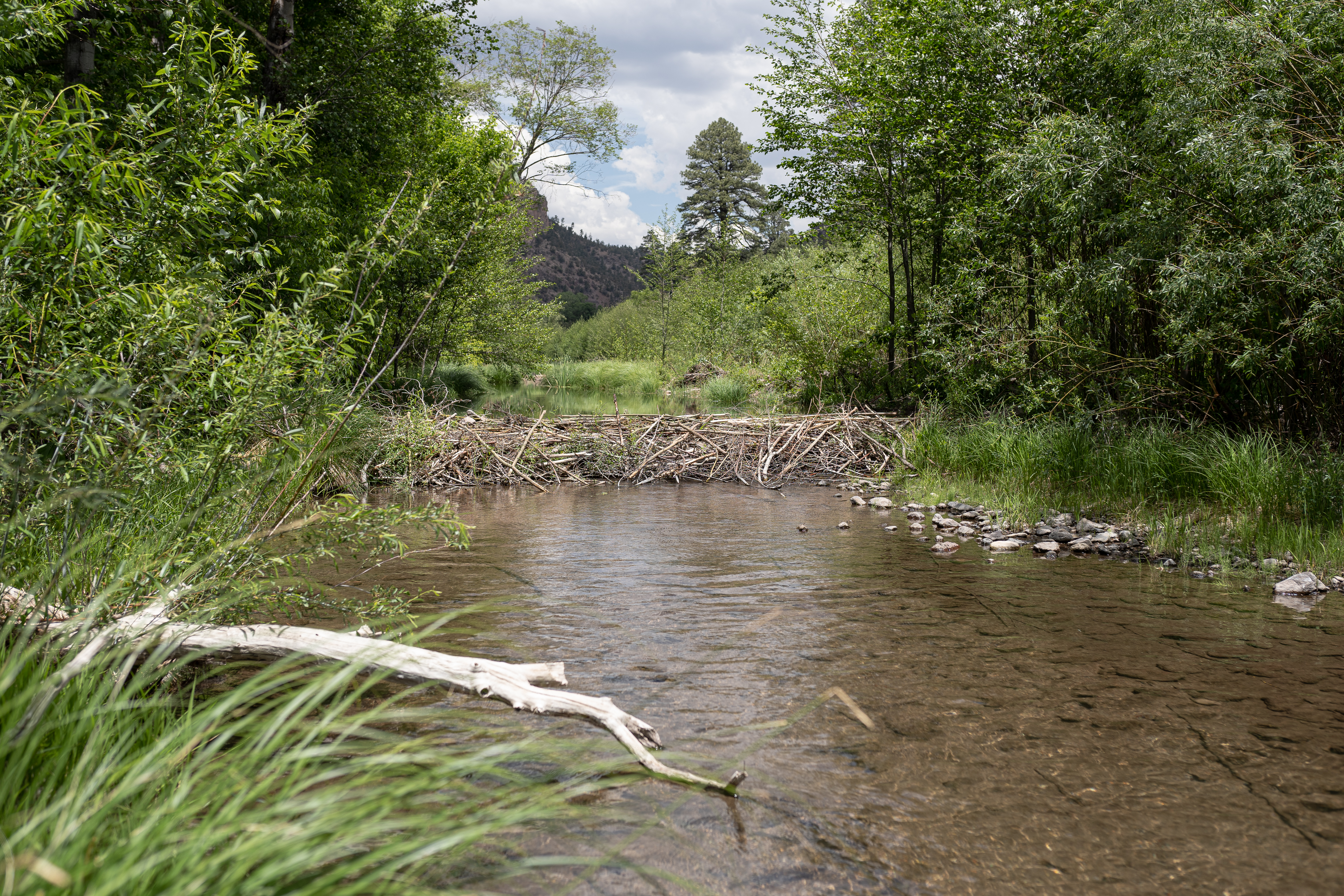
A beaver dam spans a section of the Middle Fork of the Gila River

Gila is home to namesake wildlife that includes the Gila monster, Gila trout, Gila topminnow, several members of the Gila (western chub) genus, and the Gila woodpecker. Other notable species include black bear, bald eagle, cougar, Coyote, spotted owl, elk, white-tailed deer, osprey, peregrine falcon, bobcat, collared peccary, Gray fox, white-nosed coati, racoon, mule deer, wild turkey, beaver, desert bighorn sheep, and the endangered Sonoran Pronghorn and Mexican gray wolf,

== Conservation Issues ==
Hundreds of unregulated cattle roam freely in parts of the Gila National Forest, consuming vegetation by rivers and streams and trampling habitats. In 2022, the U.S. Forest Service used helicopters to gun down 47 of these feral cattle. The Forest Service proposes to use aerial gunning to kill more of these cattle again in 2023.

In 2020, the U.S. Forest Service proposed allowing 21 herbicides within the forest, including dicamba, picloram and aminocyclopyrachlor (ACP). Dicamba is a threat to monarch butterfly habitat. ACP is a threat to ponderosa pines.

== History ==
The Gila River Forest Reserve was established on March 2, 1899, by the United States General Land Office, and was renamed the Gila Forest Reserve on July 21, 1905. The following year the forest was transferred to the U.S. Forest Service, and on March 4, 1907, it became a National Forest. Additions included Big Burros National Forest on June 18, 1908, Datil National Forest on December 24, 1931, and part of Crook National Forest on July 1, 1953.

== Recreation ==
The Gila National Forest provides much opportunity for recreation. The forest includes 139 developed recreation sites, with 30 developed campgrounds, seven picnic areas, eight points of interest, and 94 trailheads. The forest provides limitless opportunities for dispersed camping along more than 3,300 miles of designated roads and 1,600 miles of designated non-motorized trails. The forest hosts three National Recreation Trails, including 248 miles of the Continental Divide National Scenic Trail.

The 3.5 acre (1.4 ha) Cosmic Campground is ideal for star-gazing. In 2016, the campground has the claim of being the first International Dark Sky Sanctuary in North America.

Gila National Forest is probably best known for Wilderness, containing 789,385 acres within three designated wilderness areas: the Gila Wilderness, Aldo Leopold Wilderness, and Blue Range Wilderness. The Gila Wilderness was the first area to bear that designation in the country and the world. When it was designated on June 3, 1924, it included 755,000 at the core of the Gila National Forest. When the Gila Wilderness was designated in 1924, it was 40 years before the Wilderness Act established a national policy of wilderness preservation. As an administrative designation by the Forest Service, there was no law preventing changes to the boundary, uses or designation. In the 1950s, the Forest Service improved Forest Road 150, the North Star Road, bisecting the Gila Wilderness and resulting in the Gila and Aldo Leopold Wilderness boundaries we have today. Hundreds of miles of trail traverse through, over, and across these wilderness areas. The 100-mile Centennial Loop Trail was identified in 2024 to commemorate the centennial anniversary of the Gila Wilderness.

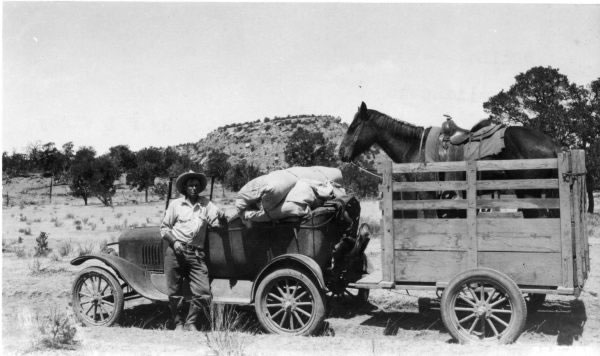
A Gila Forest Ranger with his outfit, 1928

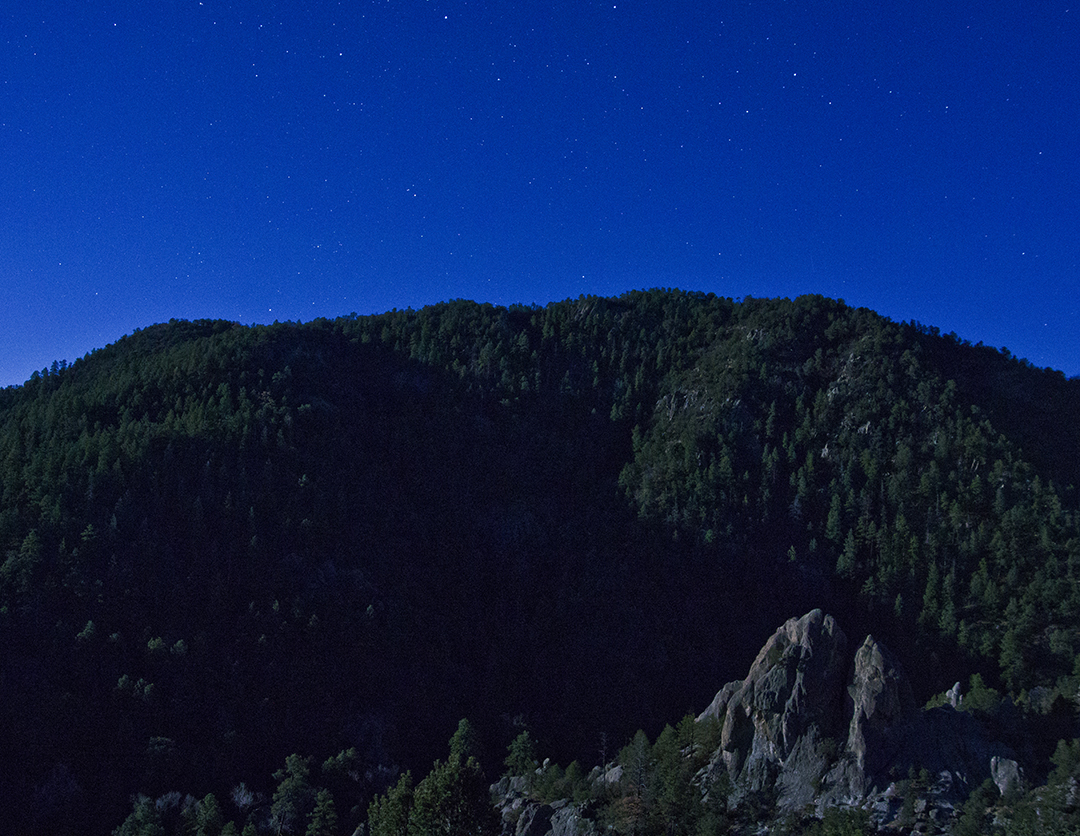
Moonlit view of Gallinas Canyon in the Black Range

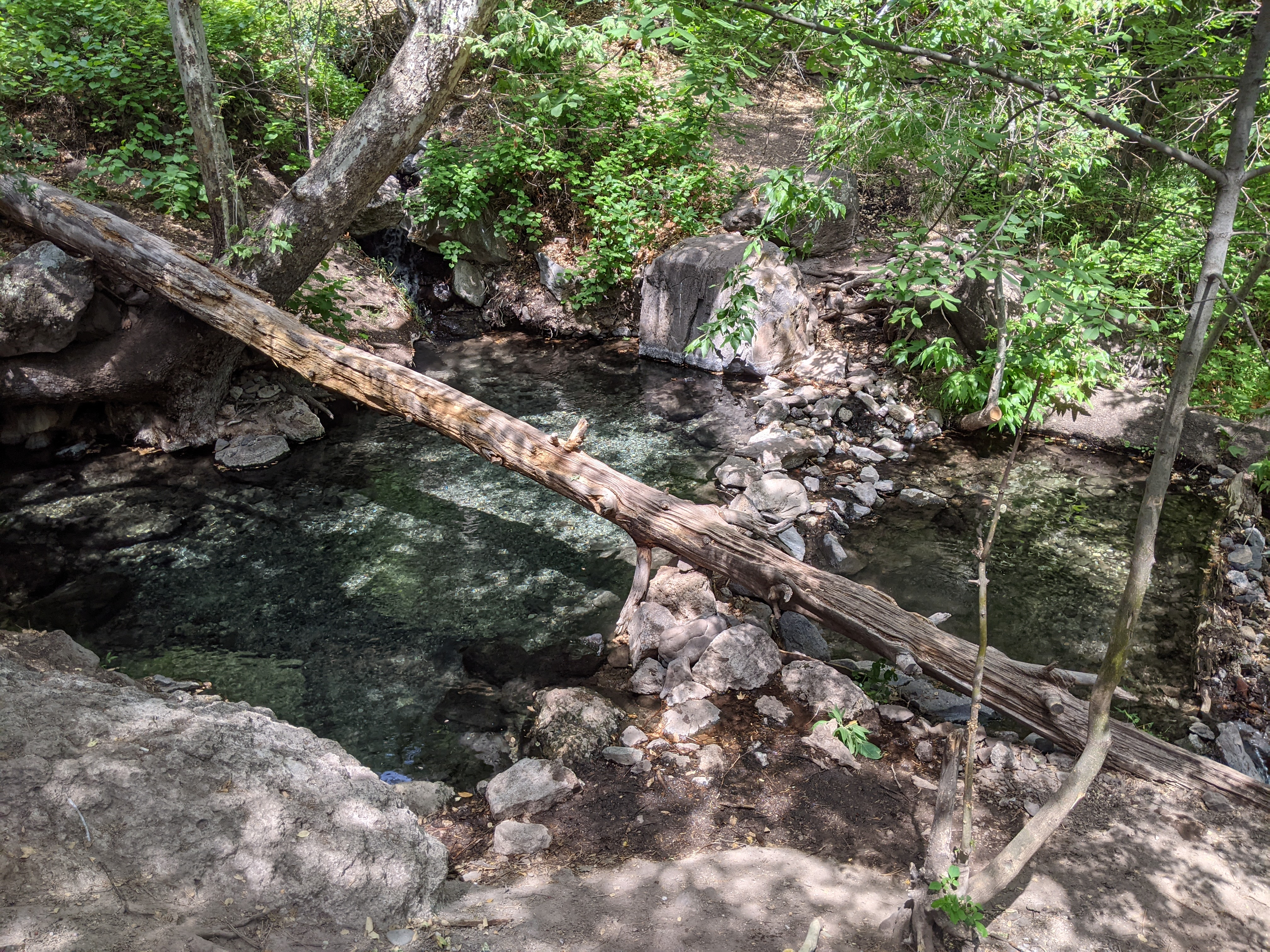
Overlooking Jordan Hot Springs in the Gila National Forest

== See also ==
- List of national forests of the United States
