= Datil, New Mexico =

- Census-designated place
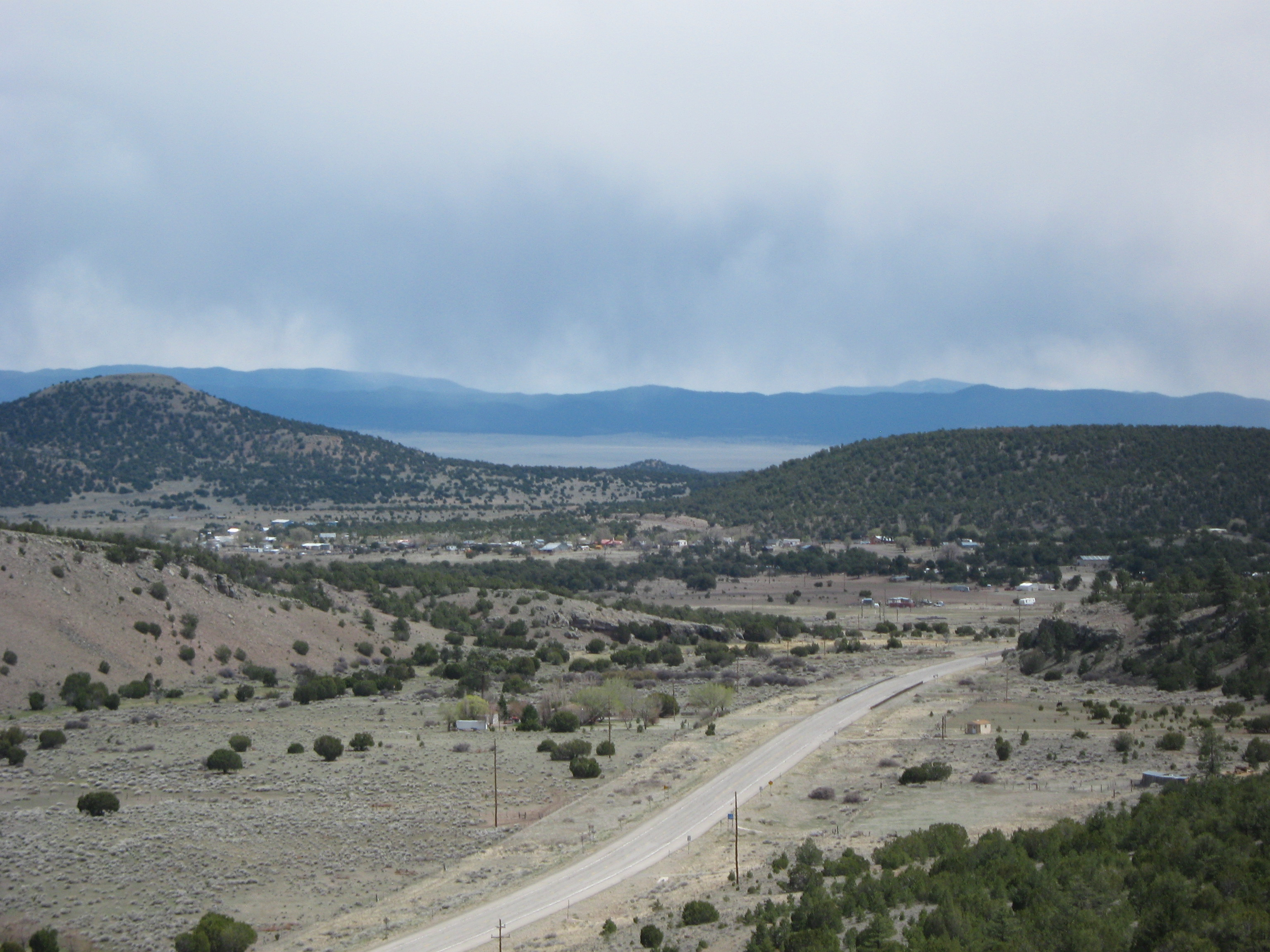
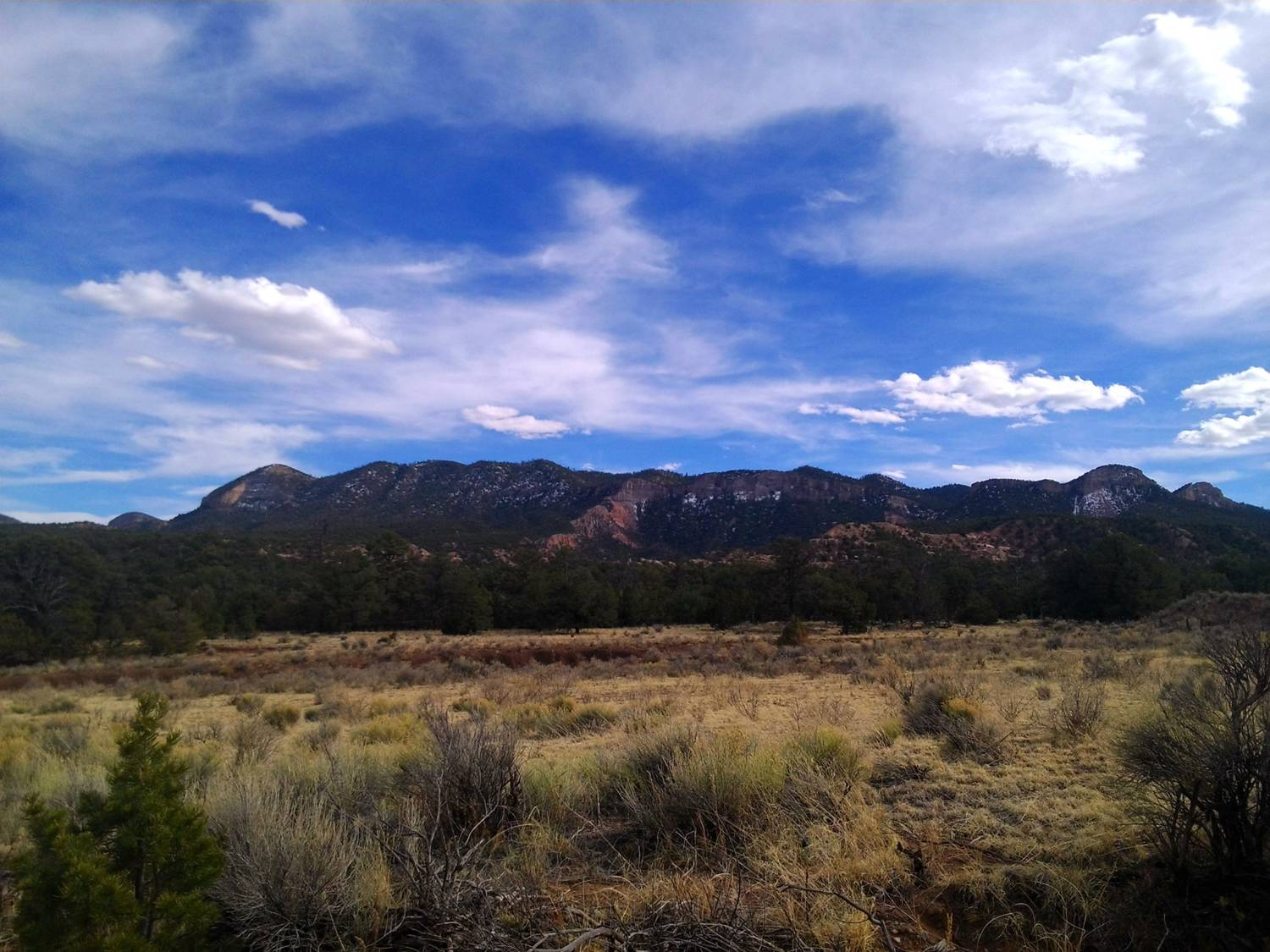
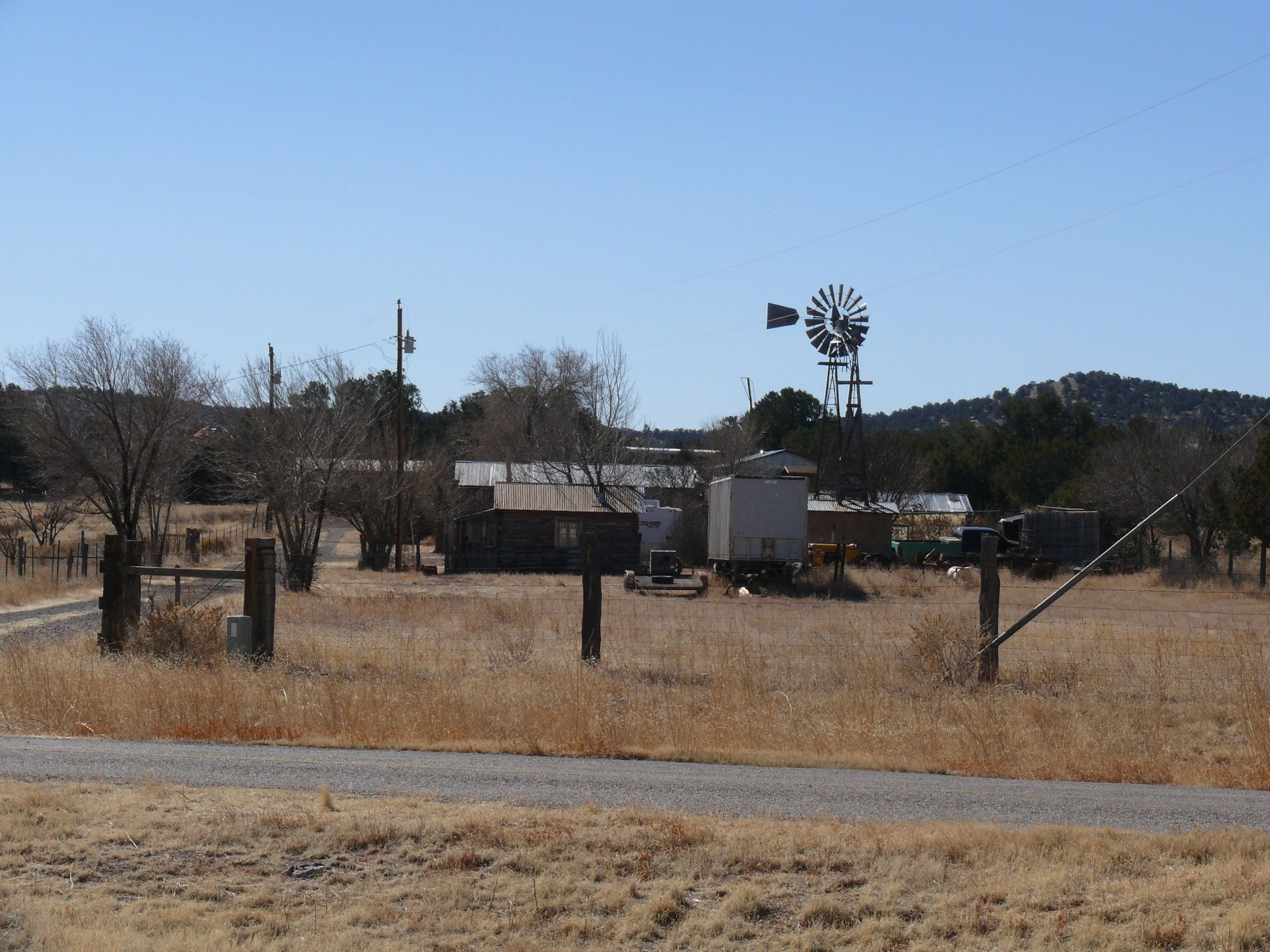
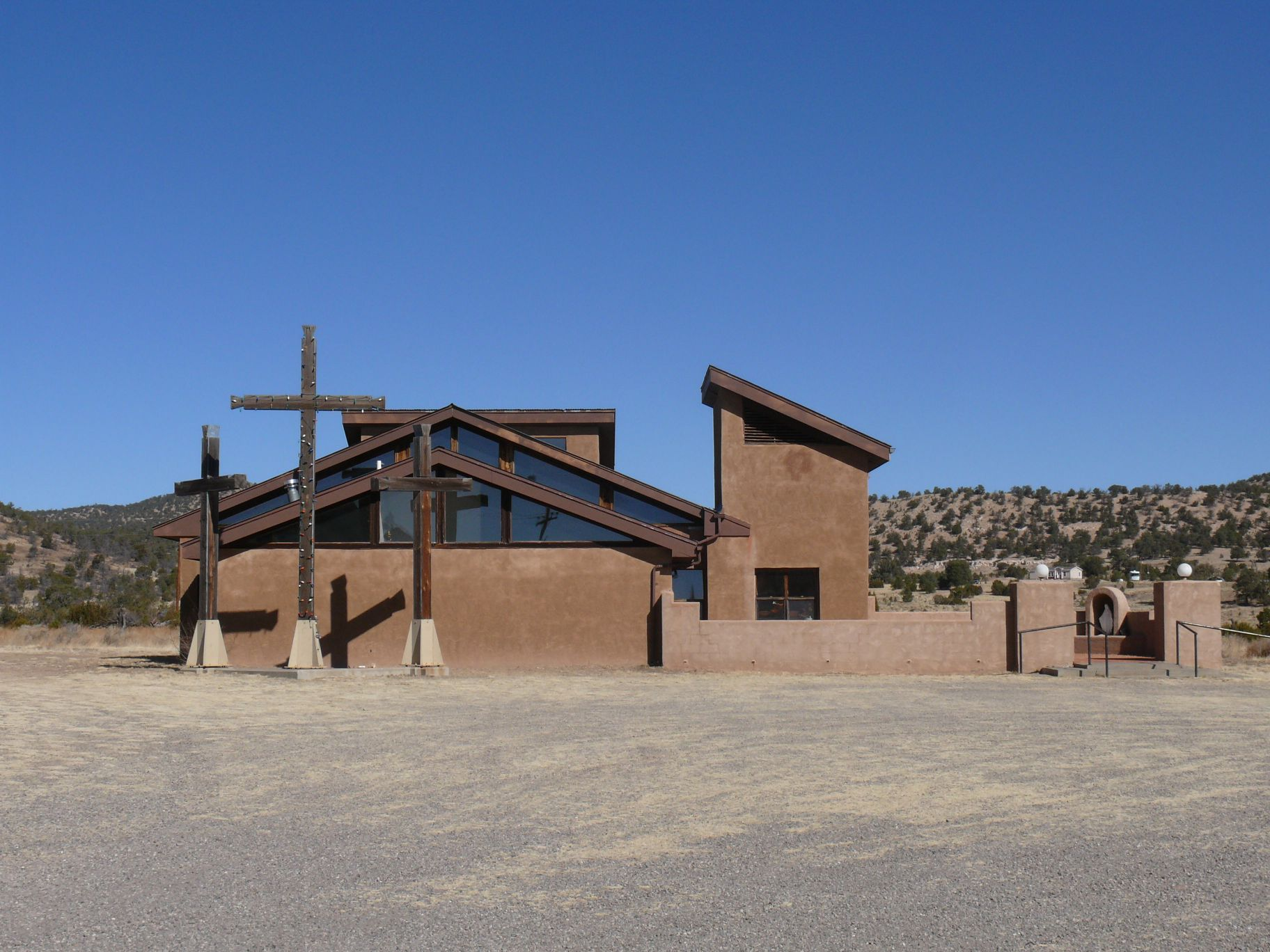
- Datil viewed from the northwest Datil Mountains Farm and windmill Church of the Nativity of the Blessed Virgin Mary

- Location within the state of New Mexico
- Coordinates: 34°08′32″N 107°50′33″W
- Country: United States
- State: New Mexico
- County: Catron

Area
  - Total: 1.87 sq mi (4.85 km^{2})
  - Land: 1.87 sq mi (4.84 km^{2})
  - Water: 0.0039 sq mi (0.01 km^{2})
- Elevation: 7,441 ft (2,268 m)

Population (2020)
  - Total: 50
  - Density: 26.7/sq mi (10.32/km^{2})
- Time zone: UTC−7 (Mountain (MST))
  - Summer (DST): UTC−6 (MDT)
- Area code: 575
- GNIS feature ID: 2584087

Datil is a census-designated place in Catron County, New Mexico, United States. As of the 2020 census, Datil had a population of 50. Located at the intersection of U.S. Route 60 and New Mexico State Road 12, Datil is on the edge of the Cibola National Forest. The Very Large Array is also nearby.

== History ==
Datil is named after the nearby Datil Mountains. The name of the mountains came in turn from the Spanish word dátil, meaning “date”; the name most likely resulted from the fruit-like appearance of the seedpods of local yucca species.

The town lay along the Magdalena Stock Driveway. The driveway, which had wells spaced every ten miles along its length, was used by ranchers during the late 19th to mid-20th century as they drove cattle from Springerville, Arizona, to the railroad at Magdalena. The Bureau of Land Management maintains a campsite, Datil Well Campground, at the location of one of the former wells.

== Geography ==
Datil is located at the intersection of U.S. Route 60 and New Mexico State Road 12. To the east lie the San Agustin Plains, the Very Large Array, and the village of Magdalena.

To the southwest, several populated subdivisions are accessible from State Road 12. The state highway continues past the local landmark Horse Mountain, a 9,490-foot (2,890 m) peak, and further through the small town Apache Creek until reaching the county seat of Reserve.

U.S. 60 travels westward from Datil, passing northwest through the Cibola National Forest and coming out the other side just outside Pie Town.

== Demographics ==
Historical population
Census	Pop.	Note	%±
2020	50		—
U.S. Decennial Census

== Education ==
The school district is Quemado Schools.

The district operates Datil Elementary School, a two-room schoolhouse with multi-level classes. Secondary students attend a K-12 school called Quemado Elementary and High School.

== Climate ==
Climate data for Datil, New Mexico. (1905-1951)
Month	Jan	Feb	Mar	Apr	May	Jun	Jul	Aug	Sep	Oct	Nov	Dec	Year
Record high °F (°C)	68 (20)	68 (20)	74 (23)	86 (30)	92 (33)	95 (35)	98 (37)	99 (37)	96 (36)	86 (30)	79 (26)	71 (22)	99 (37)
Mean daily maximum °F (°C)	44.7 (7.1)	49.1 (9.5)	57.1 (13.9)	63.7 (17.6)	72.0 (22.2)	82.7 (28.2)	83.1 (28.4)	81.9 (27.7)	79.2 (26.2)	68.7 (20.4)	56.9 (13.8)	46.7 (8.2)	65.5 (18.6)
Mean daily minimum °F (°C)	10.9 (−11.7)	17.8 (−7.9)	21.5 (−5.8)	28.6 (−1.9)	32.0 (0.0)	41.4 (5.2)	50.2 (10.1)	49.5 (9.7)	40.1 (4.5)	30.1 (−1.1)	18.3 (−7.6)	12.1 (−11.1)	29.4 (−1.4)
Record low °F (°C)	−26 (−32)	−21 (−29)	−8 (−22)	5 (−15)	11 (−12)	23 (−5)	31 (−1)	33 (1)	24 (−4)	9 (−13)	−10 (−23)	−18 (−28)	−26 (−32)
Average precipitation inches (mm)	0.55 (14)	0.50 (13)	0.44 (11)	0.53 (13)	0.70 (18)	0.74 (19)	2.30 (58)	2.77 (70)	1.72 (44)	0.85 (22)	0.61 (15)	0.70 (18)	12.42 (315)
Average snowfall inches (cm)	3.6 (9.1)	8.8 (22)	3.0 (7.6)	3.0 (7.6)	0.6 (1.5)	0.0 (0.0)	0.0 (0.0)	0.0 (0.0)	0.0 (0.0)	0.3 (0.76)	2.3 (5.8)	10.0 (25)	31.6 (80)
Source: The Western Regional Climate Center

== See also ==
- List of census-designated places in New Mexico
- Datil Mountains, the namesake of the town.
