= Plains of San Agustin =

Region in the southwestern U.S. state of New Mexico

Coordinates: 33°52′31″N 108°15′03″W

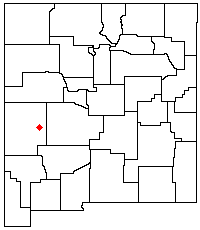
Location of the San Agustin Plains within New Mexico

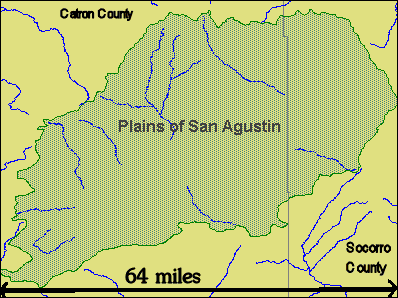
Plains of San Agustin watershed

The Plains of San Agustin (sometimes listed as the Plains of San Augustin) is a region in the southwestern U.S. state of New Mexico in the San Agustin Basin, south of U.S. Highway 60. The area spans Catron and Socorro Counties, about 50 miles (80 km) west of the town of Socorro and about 25 miles (40 km) north of Reserve. The plains extend roughly northeast-southwest, with a length of about 55 miles (88 km) and a width varying between 5–15 miles (8–24 km). The basin is bounded on the south by the Luera Mountains and Pelona Mountain (outliers of the Black Range); on the west by the Tularosa Mountains; on the north by the Mangas, Crosby, Datil, and Gallinas Mountains; and on the east by the San Mateo Mountains. The Continental Divide lies close to much of the southern and western boundaries of the plains.

== Geology ==
Geologically, the Plains of San Agustin lie within the Mogollon-Datil volcanic field, just south of the southeast edge of the Colorado Plateau, and west of the Rio Grande Rift Valley. The basin is a graben (a downdropped block which subsided between parallel faults). The graben is younger than the Datil-Mogollon volcanic eruptions. The flat floor of the plains was created by a Pleistocene lake (Lake San Agustin). Although the graben has dropped an estimated 4,000 feet (1,200 m), the surface relief has been reduced to about 2,000 feet (610 m) by sedimentation. A great deal of the sediments entered the San Agustin basin prior to the formation of Lake San Agustin in the last glacial period. There is no evidence of tectonic activity in the area after Lake San Agustin became extinct.

Hydrologically, the plains contain the terminal playas for the San Agustin Basin, an endorheic basin straddling the Continental Divide. The catchment area of the basin covers an approximate 2,000 square miles (5,200 km^{2}) of land in the surrounding area.

Ecologically, the plains lie near the northern end of the Chihuahuan Desert (though the ranges surrounding the Gila River headwaters intervene), which is dominated by shrublands.

== Climate ==
The Plains of San Agustin has a cold semi-arid climate (BSk).

Climate data for Augustine, New Mexico, 1991–2020 normals, extremes 1926–present
Month	Jan	Feb	Mar	Apr	May	Jun	Jul	Aug	Sep	Oct	Nov	Dec	Year
Record high °F (°C)	74 (23)	80 (27)	82 (28)	85 (29)	94 (34)	98 (37)	102 (39)	98 (37)	93 (34)	85 (29)	77 (25)	77 (25)	102 (39)
Mean maximum °F (°C)	60.5 (15.8)	64.7 (18.2)	71.4 (21.9)	76.4 (24.7)	84.1 (28.9)	92.3 (33.5)	91.9 (33.3)	88.6 (31.4)	85.1 (29.5)	78.6 (25.9)	69.8 (21.0)	62.6 (17.0)	93.6 (34.2)
Mean daily maximum °F (°C)	45.6 (7.6)	49.4 (9.7)	56.2 (13.4)	63.0 (17.2)	71.8 (22.1)	81.8 (27.7)	82.0 (27.8)	79.6 (26.4)	74.9 (23.8)	65.9 (18.8)	55.1 (12.8)	45.8 (7.7)	64.3 (17.9)
Daily mean °F (°C)	31.6 (−0.2)	35.1 (1.7)	40.5 (4.7)	47.2 (8.4)	55.8 (13.2)	65.5 (18.6)	68.9 (20.5)	66.7 (19.3)	60.5 (15.8)	50.0 (10.0)	39.0 (3.9)	31.2 (−0.4)	49.3 (9.6)
Mean daily minimum °F (°C)	17.5 (−8.1)	20.8 (−6.2)	24.9 (−3.9)	31.3 (−0.4)	39.8 (4.3)	49.2 (9.6)	55.9 (13.3)	53.8 (12.1)	46.1 (7.8)	34.2 (1.2)	22.9 (−5.1)	16.5 (−8.6)	34.4 (1.3)
Mean minimum °F (°C)	0.2 (−17.7)	3.8 (−15.7)	9.6 (−12.4)	16.6 (−8.6)	24.9 (−3.9)	36.1 (2.3)	46.6 (8.1)	45.1 (7.3)	33.3 (0.7)	19.2 (−7.1)	6.4 (−14.2)	−3.1 (−19.5)	−6.2 (−21.2)
Record low °F (°C)	−33 (−36)	−34 (−37)	−20 (−29)	1 (−17)	9 (−13)	15 (−9)	27 (−3)	31 (−1)	20 (−7)	5 (−15)	−36 (−38)	−25 (−32)	−36 (−38)
Average precipitation inches (mm)	0.46 (12)	0.55 (14)	0.53 (13)	0.48 (12)	0.67 (17)	0.55 (14)	2.69 (68)	2.84 (72)	2.00 (51)	1.08 (27)	0.58 (15)	0.61 (15)	13.04 (331)
Average snowfall inches (cm)	1.4 (3.6)	1.5 (3.8)	0.8 (2.0)	0.1 (0.25)	0.0 (0.0)	0.0 (0.0)	0.0 (0.0)	0.0 (0.0)	0.0 (0.0)	0.4 (1.0)	0.5 (1.3)	1.9 (4.8)	6.6 (17)
Average precipitation days (≥ 0.01 in)	3.2	2.7	2.5	1.9	2.7	2.6	8.8	8.8	6.1	3.6	2.6	2.7	48.2
Average snowy days (≥ 0.1 in)	0.7	0.7	0.3	0.0	0.0	0.0	0.0	0.0	0.0	0.2	0.2	0.9	3.0
Source: NOAA

== Landmarks ==
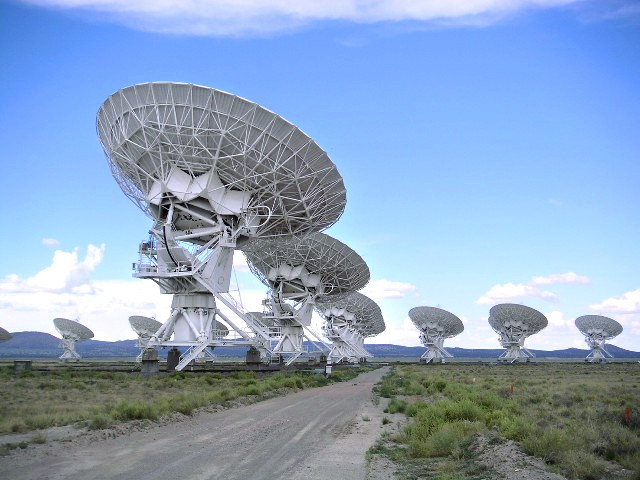
Very Large Array, on the Plains of San Agustin

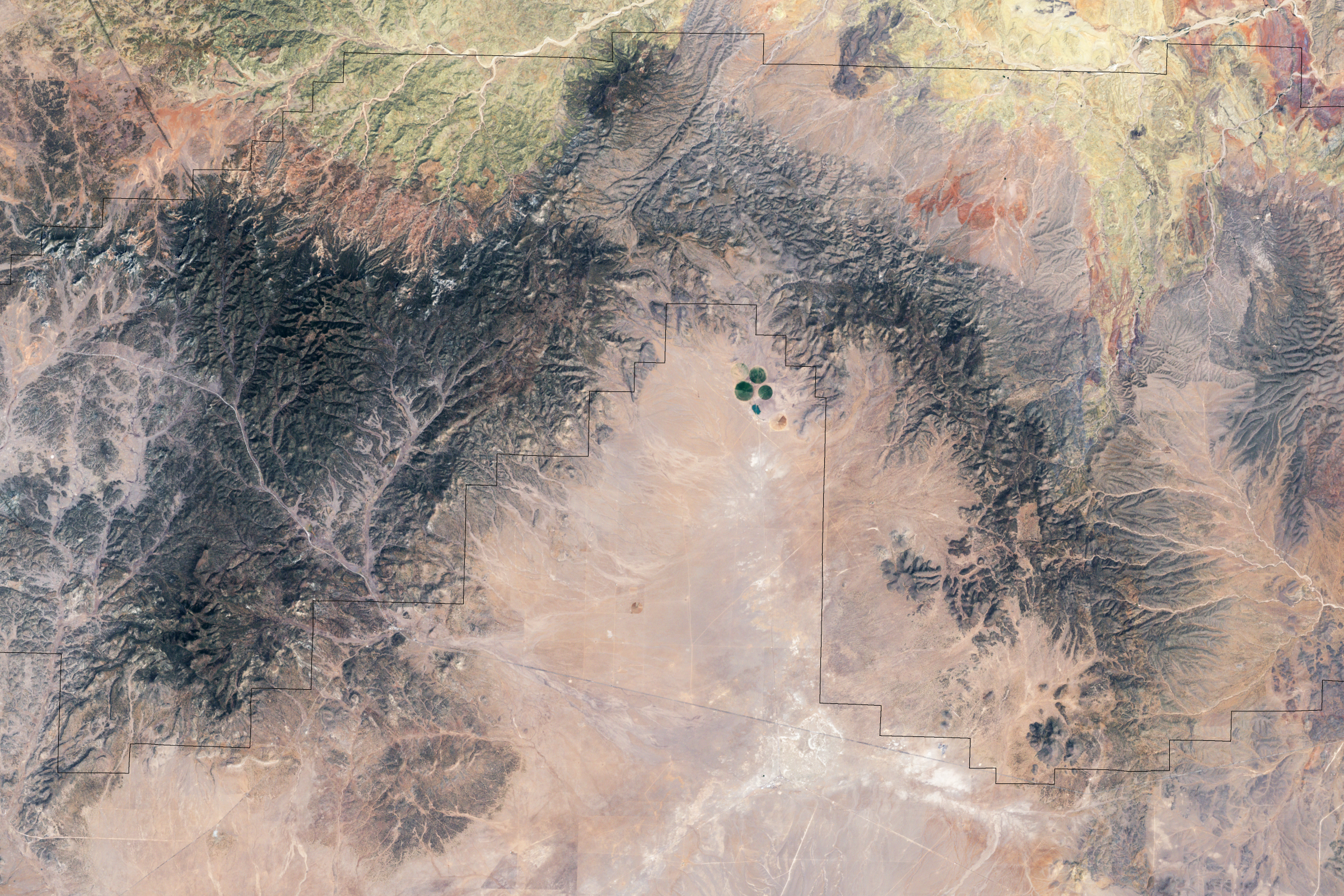
Satellite photo of the Plains of San Agustin

The plains are probably best known as the site of the Very Large Array, a radio astronomy observatory. The plains were chosen for the observatory because of their isolated location away from large population centers, and the partial shielding effect of the surrounding mountain ranges. The edges of the plains have sites of archaeological interest such as a prehistoric rockshelter known as Bat Cave.

Other sites in the area include a ghost town called Old Horse Springs and the Ake Site, a prehistoric occupation site.

== Sources ==
- Powers, William E. (1939) "Basin and Shore Features of the Extinct Lake, San Augustin, New Mexico" Journal of Geomorphology 2: pp. 345–356
- Weber, Robert H. (1994) "Pluvial Lakes of the Plains of San Augustin" In Chamberlin, R.M. et al. (1994) Mogollon Slope, West-Central New Mexico and East-Central Arizona pp. 9–11, New Mexico Geological Society, Forty-Fifth Annual Field Conference, Socorro, New Mexico.
- Holliday, Vance T. et al. (2007) "Paleoindian Geoarchaeology and the Archaeological Potential on the Plains of San Augustin, New Mexico" Argonaut Archaeological Research Fund, Department of Anthropology and Department of Geosciences, University of Arizona, Tucson, Arizona, USA
- Woodward, Susan L. (November 1996) "North American Deserts" Geography Department, Radford University, Radford, Virginia, USA
