= Sierra Aguilada =

Mountain range in Catron County, New Mexico, U.S.

- Location within New Mexico

Highest point
- Peak: Brushy Mountain
- Elevation: 7,435 ft (2,266 m)
- Coordinates: 33°18′15″N 108°56′01″W

Dimensions
- Length: 15 mi (24 km) SW-NE
- Width: 9 mi (14 km) E-W-(variable)

Geography
- Country: United States
- State: New Mexico
- Regions: (east)-White Mountains (Arizona); ((east)-Transition zone)
- County: Catron County
- Settlements: Glenwood and Pleasanton
- Range coordinates: 33°18′15″N 108°56′00″W
- Borders on: San Francisco River–Mogollon Mountains-E; Big Lue Mountains-SW; San Francisco River-S-(range perimeter); Mesas-W; Blue Range Wilderness-N & NW

The Sierra Aguilada is a mountain range in southwest Catron County, New Mexico on the eastern perimeter of Arizona's White Mountains. The Mogollon Mountains of New Mexico lie just east, with a south-flowing section of the San Francisco River separating them. The river then turns west, forming the southern border of the Sierra Aguilada, and continues to eventually intercept the Gila River after traversing northwest of the Big Lue Mountains of Arizona.

== Geography ==
The Sierra Aguilada is about 15 mi (24 km) long in a region of mountainous forest and mesas. The Mogollon Mountains are east, with the large Gila Wilderness and Gila National Forest To the north, the Blue Range Wilderness lies to the northwest.

The east perimeter of the range is traversed by U.S. Route 180 in New Mexico as it parallels a north-south section of the San Francisco River. The communities of Pleasanton and Glenwood lie on the east and northeast of the range along the San Francisco River.

=== Peaks ===
The highest peak in the range, Brushy Mountain, 7,435 feet (2,266 m), is in the north center of the range and east of the range centerline; Park Mountain, 7,321 feet (2,231 m), is adjacent, and just west of the range centerline.
