= Center Baldy =

Landform in Catron County, New Mexico

- Location within New Mexico Location within the United States

Highest point
- Elevation: 10,525 ft (3,208 m)
- Prominence: 215 ft (66 m)
- Isolation: 0.46 mi (0.74 km) to Peak 10565
- Coordinates: 33°18′11″N 108°38′19″W

Geography
- Location: Catron County, New Mexico, United States
- Parent range: Mogollon Mountains
- Topo map: USGS Alegres Mountain

Geology
- Rock age(s): Miocene, between 23 and 5 Million years ago
- Rock type: Younger Rhyolite Flows and Domes
- Volcanic zone: Mogollon-Datil volcanic field, Bursum Caldera

Climbing
- Easiest route: Hiking, Open Country

Center Baldy is a mountain in the Gila Wilderness in Catron County, New Mexico. Center Baldy is found in the Mogollon Mountains and is the 7th highest peak in the Mogollon Mountains.

Alegres Mountain is 11 miles (19 km) southeast of Mogollon, New Mexico and can be accessed via the Holt Apache Trial.
