= San Francisco Plaza, New Mexico =

Unincorporated community in New Mexico, United States

- Unincorporated community
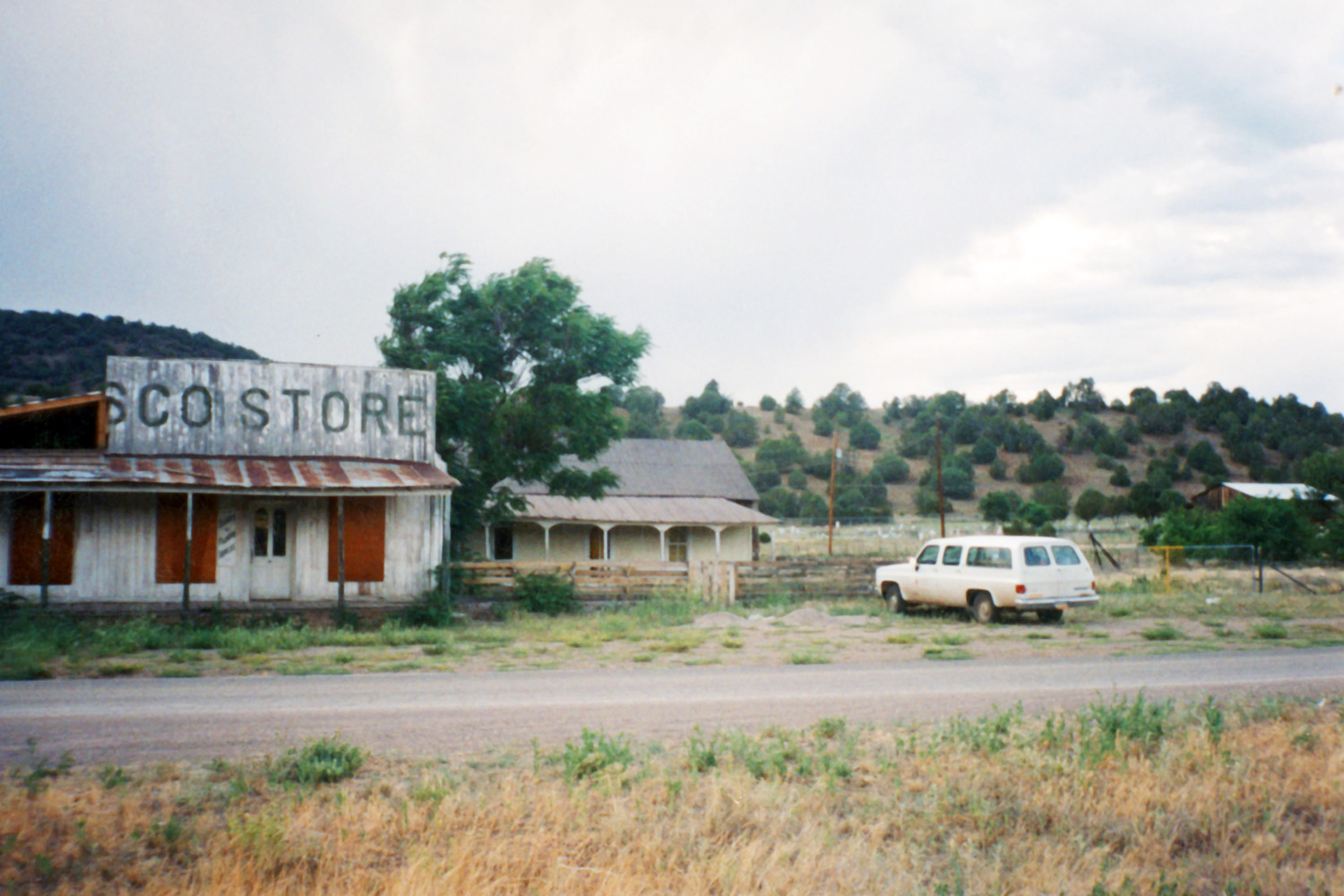
- The Frisco Store in Lower Frisco Plaza

- Location of San Francisco Plaza, New Mexico
- Coordinates: 33°41′36″N 108°45′58″W
- Country: United States
- State: New Mexico
- County: Catron
- Elevation: 5,725 ft (1,745 m)

Population (2000)
  - Total: 0
- Time zone: UTC-5 (Mountain (MST))
  - Summer (DST): MDT
- Area code: 575
- GNIS feature ID: 923678

San Francisco Plaza was the name of three towns in Catron County, New Mexico, United States. Located in the San Francisco River Valley, the towns were settled by Spanish settlers in the 1860s. Today Middle San Francisco Plaza is called Middle Frisco, Lower San Francisco is called Lower Frisco, and Upper San Francisco was renamed Reserve when U.S. Forest Service headquarters were built there.

== About ==
Located in the San Francisco Valley, Reserve was named Upper San Francisco Plaza by its original Hispanic settlers in 1874. Apaches made frequent attacks on the community, which sit within Apache hunting lands. In the late 1870s Anglo settlers began arriving. They renamed Upper Frisco Plaza as Milligan's Plaza after a town merchant and saloon owner.

Lower San Francisco Plaza was the site of the legendary Frisco shootout of Elfego Baca in 1884. The self-appointed deputy sheriff made a stand-off against a mob of Texas cowboys in Lower San Francisco Plaza in 1884, quickly gaining a reputation as the hero of the Frisco shootout. Author Louis L'Amour included Upper San Francisco Plaza in his novel Conagher, calling it "The Plaza". The Tularosa River flows into the San Francisco River at Middle San Francisco Plaza.
