= Alma Massacre =

Coordinates: 33°24′46″N 108°50′12″W

- Location: Alma, New Mexico
- Date: April 28, 1880
- Attack type: Mass murder
- Deaths: 41
- Perpetrator: Apache warriors

The Alma Massacre involved an April 28, 1880, Chiricahua Apache raid on United States settlers' homes around Alma, New Mexico Territory. At least 41 people were killed during the raid.

== Details ==
The Chiricahua Apache raiding party was led by Victorio during his 1879–1880 guerrilla action. The party first attacked a silver mine near the present-day town of Cooney, in the Mogollon Mountains on April 28, 1880. At the mining camp, they killed three. They then caught up to three men fleeing the area, one of whom was former Sergeant James C. Cooney of the 8th U.S. Cavalry, killing them all. Following the initial attack, the Apaches went on to kill another thirty-five people in the area, mainly sheepherders and their families. The Weekly New Mexican reported on May 10 that "one hundred thousand head of sheep...were scattered or killed." Victorio and his men left the region when U.S. Army troopers from Fort Bayard arrived.

== Memorials ==
There have been two memorials erected to commemorate the events. Sergeant Cooney's brother and others dynamited out a rock tomb where they buried him. In April 1980, Dave Foreman and Earth First! erected a monument in the Gila Wilderness to honor Victorio's defense of the mountains, crediting the memorial to the non-existent "New Mexico Patriotic Heritage Society."
