= Erigeron hessii =

Conservation status
- Critically Imperiled (NatureServe)

Scientific classification
- Kingdom: Plantae
- Clade: Tracheophytes
- Clade: Angiosperms
- Clade: Eudicots
- Clade: Asterids
- Order: Asterales
- Family: Asteraceae
- Genus: Erigeron
- Species: E. hessii

Binomial name
- Erigeron hessii G.L.Nesom

Species of flowering plant

Erigeron hessii is a rare species of flowering plant in the family Asteraceae known by the common name Hess' fleabane. It is endemic to New Mexico in the United States, where it is known from two locations in the Mogollon Mountains. It is found only in the Gila Wilderness.

This rhizomatous perennial herb produces hairy stems a few centimeters tall. The leaves are somewhat lance-shaped and up to 5 to 7 centimeters long. The flower heads are lined with hairy, glandular phyllaries and contain many white or lavender ray florets each up to 1.3 centimeters long.

This plant grows in subalpine forest and grassland habitat in crevices in rock outcrops. There are only two occurrences, both near Whitewater Baldy in the Mogollon Mountains. There are a few hundred plants in each of the two populations.
