= Whitewater Creek (New Mexico) =

Coordinates: 33°18′50″N 108°53′22″W

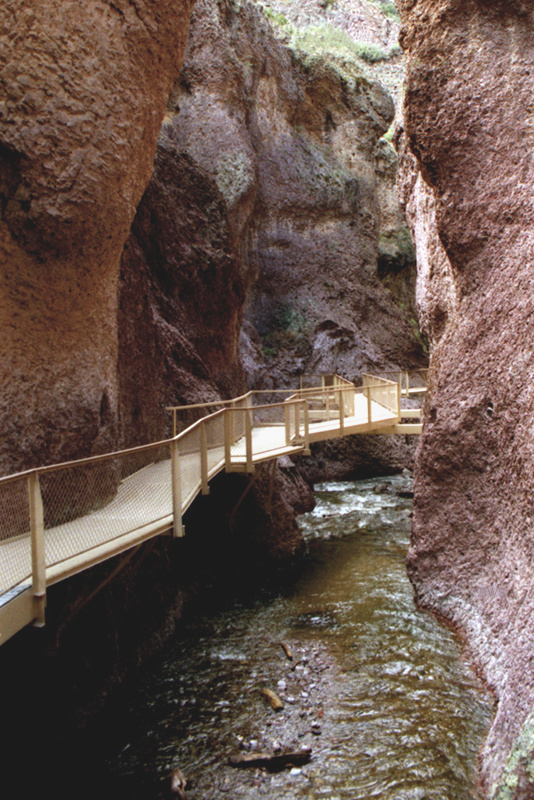
- Catwalk within the canyon, with the stream below

- Location of the creek's mouth in Catron County, New Mexico

Location
- Country: United States
- States: New Mexico
- Counties: Catron County, New Mexico

Physical characteristics
- Mouth

Whitewater Creek is a stream within a canyon in Catron County, western New Mexico, United States. It lies along the northwest boundary of the Gila Wilderness, in the Mogollon Mountains. It features the Catwalk National Recreation Trail, including a picnic area. The towns of Mogollon and Glenwood are near the west end of the creek.

== Gallery ==
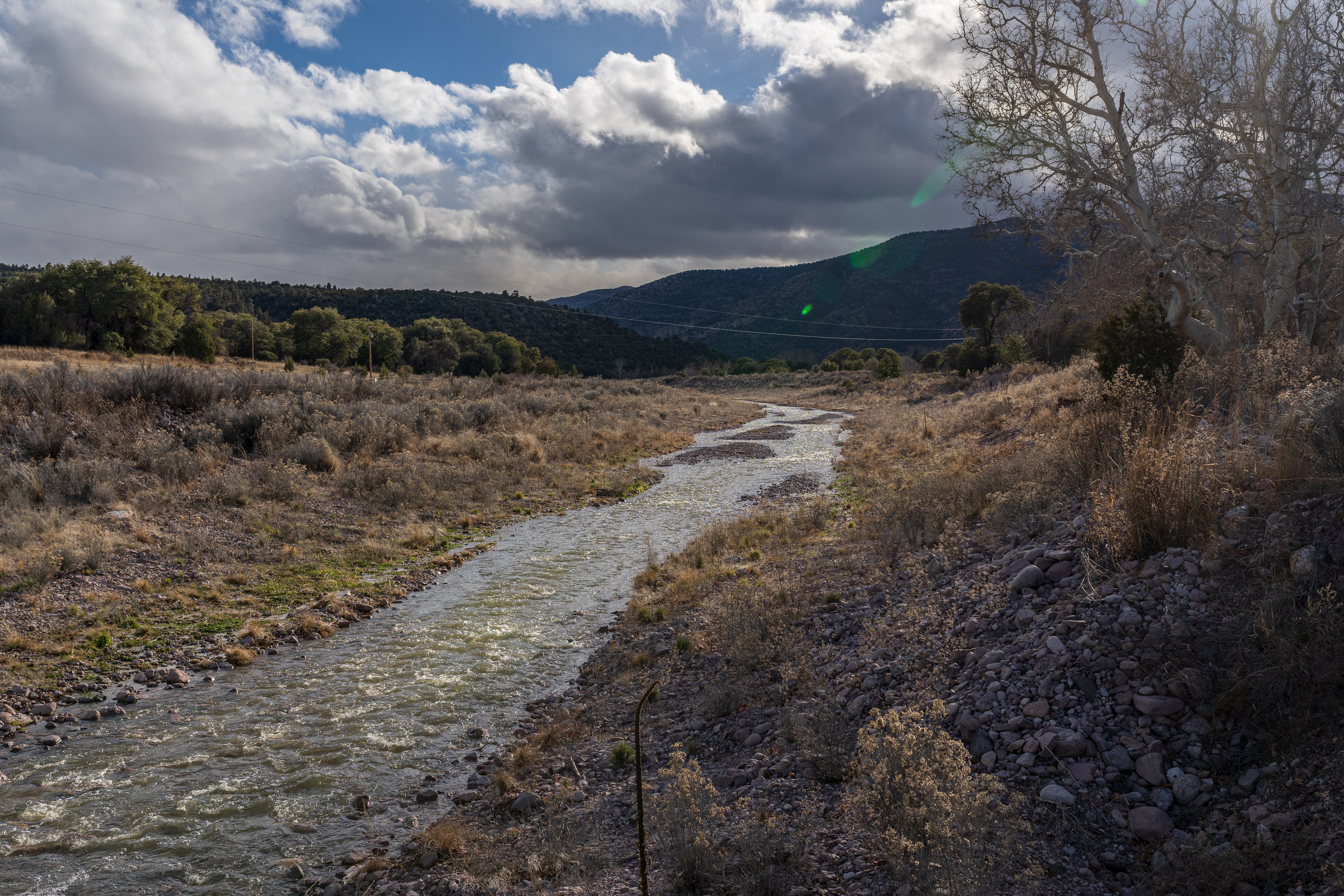
Winter run-off fills Whitewater Creek on 26 February 2023

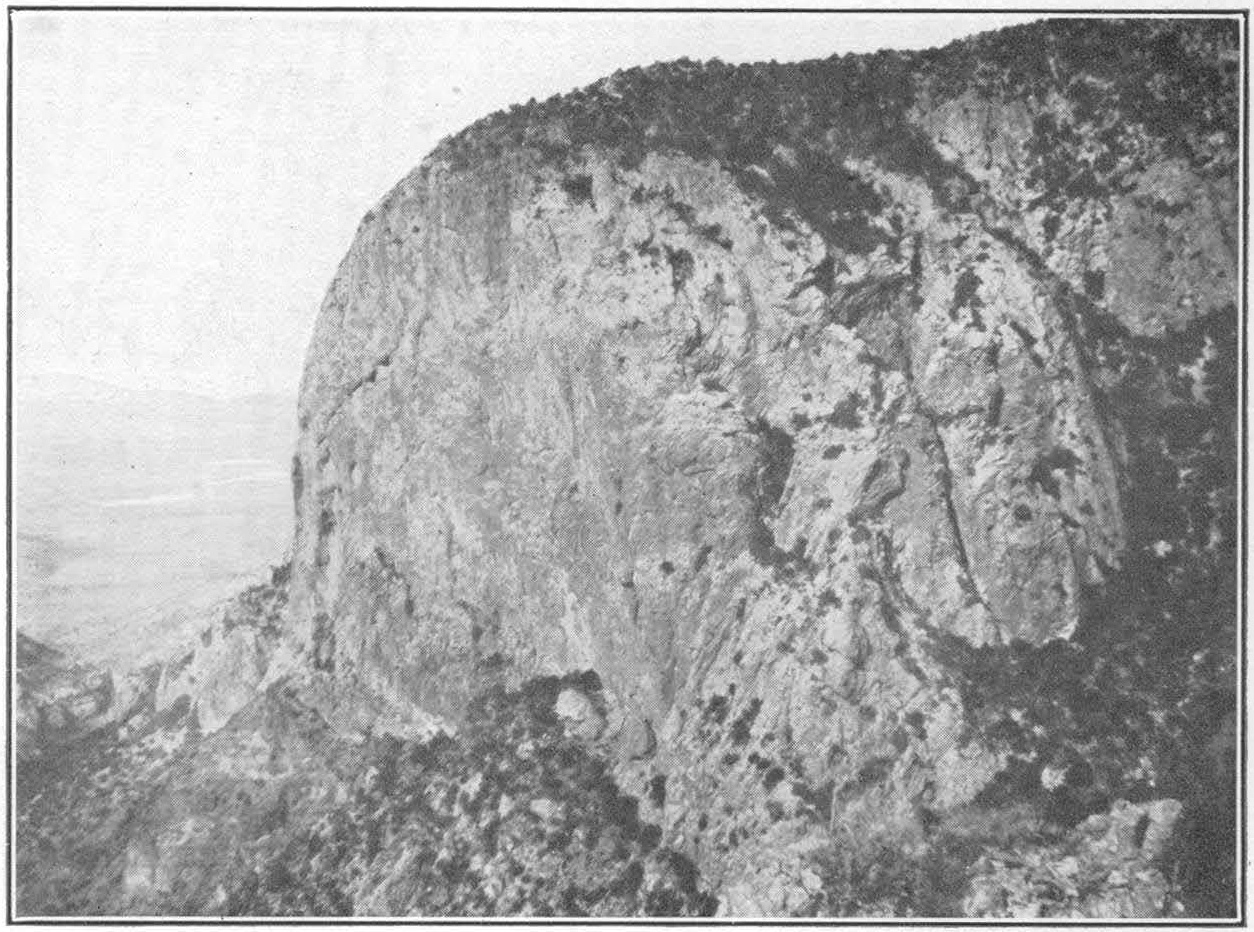
Fault scarp of Fanney Rhyolite, north wall of Whitewater Canyon

== See also ==
- List of rivers in New Mexico
