= Cooney, New Mexico =

Ghost town in New Mexico, United States

- Ghost town
- Location within the state of New Mexico Cooney (the United States)
- Coordinates: 33°25′22″N 108°48′28″W
- Country: United States
- State: New Mexico
- County: Catron

Population (2000)
  - Total: 0
- Time zone: UTC-5 (Mountain (MST))
  - Summer (DST): MDT
- Area code: 575

Cooney is a ghost town in Catron County, New Mexico, United States, east of Alma. Cooney was once home to gold and silver prospectors in the nearby Mogollon Mountains.

== History ==
In the 1870s Sergeant James C. Cooney of Fort Bayard found a rich strand of gold in the Gila Mountains near the future site of Mogollon, New Mexico. His find led to the development of several different mines in the area, as well as the settlement of the towns of Mogollon, Alma, and Glenwood.

Several settlers from Cooney were killed, including James Cooney, during an event called the Alma Massacre. The town was washed away in a flood in 1911.

== Cooney Cemetery ==
Cooney Cemetery is a small graveyard found near the Cooney townsite in an isolated area east of Alma, New Mexico. It is located in the southern part of Catron County, approximately seven miles east of Alma on County Road 7. Cooney Cemetery was created when James Cooney's brother, Captain Mike Cooney, and friends carved a sepulcher out of a rock in the canyon where he was killed and buried him there, sealing the tomb with the silver-bearing ore taken from the mine he discovered. The main part of the cemetery is located behind the above tomb and contains seven burials.

== Earth First! Monument ==
In 1980 Earth First! erected a monument dedicated to Victorio for his successful raid on Cooney and the killing of Cooney and his men. It read, in part,

This monument celebrates the 100th anniversary of the great Apache chief Victorio's raid on the Cooney mining camp near Mogollon, New Mexico, on April 12, 1880. Victorio strove to protect these mountains from mining and other destructive activities of the white race. The present Gila Wilderness is partly a fruit of his efforts...
