= Apache Creek, New Mexico =

- Census-designated place
- Location within the state of New Mexico
- Coordinates: 33°49′59″N 108°37′30″W
- Country: United States
- State: New Mexico
- County: Catron

Area
  - Total: 8.22 sq mi (21.28 km^{2})
  - Land: 8.20 sq mi (21.24 km^{2})
  - Water: 0.015 sq mi (0.04 km^{2})
- Elevation: 6,411 ft (1,954 m)

Population (2020)
  - Total: 64
  - Density: 7.8/sq mi (3.01/km^{2})
- Time zone: UTC-5 (Mountain (MST))
  - Summer (DST): MDT
- Area code: 575
- GNIS feature ID: 903222

Apache Creek is a census-designated place in Catron County, New Mexico, United States. As of the 2020 census, Apache Creek had a population of 64. Located 3 miles (5 km) northeast of Cruzville, it is situated at the confluence of Apache Creek and the Tularosa River. The Apache Creek Pueblo, also called the "Apache Creek Ruin", is near the town. It was listed by the New Mexico Historic Preservation Commission in 1969.

== History ==
Apache leaders Mangas Coloradas, Victorio, Geronimo, Chato and Cochise carried on guerrilla warfare against United States settlers in this area. Cochise's infamous Alma Massacre was carried out from this area, as well. Originally the Apache were friendly to the explorers and colonists, but when their land and water was taken over by the pioneers they fought back. The warfare came to an end after the surrender of Geronimo in 1886.

From 1928 to 1958 Apache Creek had its own post office, and since then mail has gone to Aragon.

== Present ==
Apache Creek has a cemetery that dates from 1900 through the 1960s.

== Demographics ==
Historical population
Census	Pop.	Note	%±
2020	64		—
U.S. Decennial Census

== Apache Creek Pueblo ==
The Apache Creek Pueblo is located north of the town of Apache Creek. It was listed by the New Mexico Historic Preservation Commission in 1969 as the "Apache Creek Ruin". The site has been identified as an Upland Mogollon pueblo with pit-houses occupied between 1150-1300 A.D. The pueblo had between 25 and 50 rooms with masonry construction throughout.

== Education ==
It is in the Reserve Independent School District.
