= New Mexico State Road 12 =

State highway in New Mexico, United States

State Road 12
- NM 1 highlighted in red

Route information
- Maintained by NMDOT
- Length: 74.297 mi (119.569 km)

Major junctions
- West end: US 180 near Reserve
- NM 435 in Reserve; NM 32 in Apache Creek
- East end: US 60 in Datil

Location
- Country: United States
- State: New Mexico
- Counties: Catron

Highway system
- New Mexico State Highway System; Interstate; US; State; Scenic
← NM 11	→ NM 13

New Mexico State Road 12 (NM 12) is a primarily west–east state road in western New Mexico. The road is 74.3 miles (119.6 km) long and runs from U.S. Route 180 (US 180) west of Reserve to US 60 in Datil. NM 12 is located entirely within Catron County. The road's original alignment ran south from its western terminus to near Mule Creek, but this section was later removed. The road was designated a State Highway by the New Mexico legislature in 1917. State Road 12 was paved during the 1950s.

== Major intersections ==
The entire route is in Catron County.

Location	mi	km	Destinations	Notes
	0.000	0.000	US 180 – Silver City, Eagar, AZ	Western terminus
Reserve	7.086	11.404	NM 435 south (Main Street) – San Francisco Plaza	Northern terminus of NM 435
Apache Creek	19.249	30.978	NM 32 north – Quemado	Southern terminus of NM 32
Datil	74.297	119.569	US 60 – Socorro, Eagar, AZ	Eastern terminus
1.000 mi = 1.609 km; 1.000 km = 0.621 mi
