= Alma, New Mexico =

- Census-designated place
- Location within the state of New Mexico Alma (the United States)
- Coordinates: 33°22′46″N 108°53′55″W
- Country: United States
- State: New Mexico
- County: Catron

Area
  - Total: 3.26 sq mi (8.44 km^{2})
  - Land: 3.25 sq mi (8.43 km^{2})
  - Water: 0.0039 sq mi (0.01 km^{2})
- Elevation: 4,918 ft (1,499 m)

Population (2020)
  - Total: 47
  - Density: 14.5/sq mi (5.58/km^{2})
- Time zone: UTC-7 (Mountain (MST))
  - Summer (DST): UTC-6 (MDT)
- Area code: 575
- FIPS code: 35-02560
- GNIS feature ID: 2806685

Alma is an unincorporated community and census-designated place in Catron County, New Mexico, United States, north of Glenwood and south of Reserve. As of the 2020 census, Alma had a population of 47.

== History ==
Sergeant James C. Cooney laid out a town on site of Alma in the early 1870s, but left it undeveloped. The town was bought by a Captain Birney, who named it "Alma" for his mother. In 1882 the U.S. Post Office opened in Alma, lasting until 1931.

The town was home of Butch Cassidy and the Sundance Kid's infamous Wild Bunch gang for a short period. They worked at the nearby WS ranch. Reportedly, the foreman and ranch manager were very happy with the Wild Bunch's work since the rustling stopped while they were employed at the ranch. Tom Ketchum, Harvey Logan and William Antrim, Billy the Kid's stepfather, also lived in Alma at some point. Artist Olaf Wieghorst once worked on the Cunningham Ranch near Alma.

Charlie Siringo wrote that Butch Cassidy "ran a saloon there under the name of Jim Lowe."

Alma is the site of a Boot Hill cemetery, which is located about two miles north of the town.

=== Alma Massacre ===
The "Alma Massacre" involved an Indian raid on United States settlers' homes around Alma in 1880. As many as 41 people were killed during and immediately after the event. There were two memorials erected to commemorate these events.

== Present ==
Today, Alma is labeled as a "ghost town" by the New Mexico Tourism Department. Situated on U.S. Route 180, the town has a restaurant and a small store, as well as a few dozen scattered homes. There is a cemetery with more than 100 burials dating from the 1880s to present. The well-kept grounds are marked with a hand-crafted sign. There are several other cemeteries in Alma's proximity, as well, including the WS Ranch Cemetery and Cooney's Tomb.

The town is in the middle of the Blue Range Wilderness, which is part of New Mexico's Gila National Forest and the Apache-Sitgreaves National Forest in Arizona.

In the 1998 the United States Fish and Wildlife Service reintroduced the Mexican gray wolf to its historic range, including the area surrounding Alma. Ranchers in the area have expressed concerns about the impact of the wolf on the local cattle population while environmentalists contend that ranchers are not managing their herds properly. In 2000 a local newspaper reported a number of wolf sightings and wolf attacks on cattle. Meanwhile, environmentalists in the area contend that the federal government is acting in the favor of the ranchers, with forty-nine percent of all reintroduced wolves "captured or killed because of conflicts with ranchers." The wolf reintroduction program remains a "hot issue", and there are environmentalists, ranchers, law enforcement, and a variety of others involved.

== Demographics ==
Historical population
Census	Pop.	Note	%±
2020	47		—
U.S. Decennial Census

== Education ==
It is in the Reserve Independent School District.

== Bibliography ==
- Stanley, F. (1960) The Alma Story.
- Reed, O. (2005) "In a remote cemetery, far from home, lie the soldiers killed in a Christmastime skirmish with Apaches," Albuquerque Tribune. 12/22/05.
