= Rivers, New Mexico =

- Census-designated place
- Location within New Mexico
- Coordinates: 33°40′33″N 108°46′37″W
- Country: United States
- State: New Mexico
- County: Catron

Area
  - Total: 2.24 sq mi (5.81 km^{2})
  - Land: 2.24 sq mi (5.81 km^{2})
  - Water: 0 sq mi (0.00 km^{2})
- Elevation: 5,696 ft (1,736 m)

Population (2020)
  - Total: 22
  - Density: 9.8/sq mi (3.79/km^{2})
- Time zone: UTC-7 (Mountain (MST))
  - Summer (DST): UTC-6 (MDT)
- Area code: 575
- GNIS feature ID: 2584193

Rivers is a census-designated place in Catron County, New Mexico, United States. As of the 2020 census, Rivers had a population of 22. The community is located at the confluence of the Tularosa River into the San Francisco River.

== Geography ==
According to the U.S. Census Bureau, the community has an area of 1.010 square miles (2.62 km^{2}); 1.008 square miles (2.61 km^{2}) is land and 0.002 square miles (0.0052 km^{2}) is water.

== Demographics ==
Historical population
Census	Pop.	Note	%±
2020	22		—
U.S. Decennial Census

== Education ==
It is in the Reserve Independent School District.
