= Cooney's Tomb =

Historic location in Catron County, New Mexico

Coordinates: 33.41303°N 108.83758°W

- Interactive map of Cooney's Tomb

Details
- Location: Alma, New Mexico

Cooney's Tomb is a historic location near Alma, Catron County, New Mexico. Marked by a large boulder on the side of a roadway, it is the site where former Army Sergeant James C. Cooney was interred in 1880 after being killed by a group of Apaches.

== History ==
As a sergeant in the 8th Cavalry Regiment at Fort Bayard, James C. Cooney came to New Mexico in 1870. While on duty as a scout, he discovered silver-bearing rock in the nearby Mogollon Mountains, but did not disclose his findings. After his discharge in 1875, he came to the area in 1876 with two companions to work the claim.

=== Alma Massacre ===
On April 29, 1880, Sergeant Cooney, Jack Chick, and a man whose last name was Buhlman were on horseback riding to Alma to warn the settlers of an Indian attack at the Cooney mine and the town of Cooney. Victorio had led a group of Chiricahua Apache tribal members in the massacre. Shortly thereafter, Sergeant Cooney's brother Michael and miners from nearby Pinos Altos drilled, blasted and chipped a sepulcher for his remains in a large boulder. The Sergeant has remained interred there since.

=== Cemetery ===
The area around the tomb soon became a cemetery with a collection of graves. Four graves in front of Cooney's Tomb were enclosed in a low wrought iron fence. A flood washed away those graves, along with two large marble stone markers. The road by the tomb was rebuilt.

Cooney's brother, Captain Michael Cooney, took over his mine after his death. A town called Cooney was founded shortly thereafter. Michael Cooney died while searching for a lost gold mine in the Mogollon mountains, and the canyon where his body was found was named Cooney Canyon. Today, Cooney's Tomb is located about 5 miles east of Alma in Cooney Canyon on Mineral Creek. In 2009, The Conservation Fund helped the U.S. Fish and Wildlife Service acquire 40 acres, including the tomb, from a private owner. The tomb is now located within the Gila National Forest.

== See also ==
- List of cemeteries in New Mexico
