= Little Dry Creek =

Little Dry Creek may refer to a waterway in the United States:

- Little Dry Creek (California), in Yuba County
- Little Dry Creek (Arapahoe County, Colorado)
- Little Dry Creek (Westminster, Colorado)
- Little Dry Creek (New Mexico)
  - Battle of Little Dry Creek, an engagement during Geronimo's War
