= Whitewater Baldy =

Mountain in New Mexico, United States

- Location within New Mexico

Highest point
- Elevation: 10,899 ft (3,322 m) NGVD 29
- Prominence: 3,535 ft (1,077 m)
- Coordinates: 33°19′25″N 108°38′30″W

Geography
- Location: Catron County, New Mexico, U.S.
- Parent range: Mogollon Mountains
- Topo map: USGS Grouse Mountain

Geology
- Volcanic field: Mogollon-Datil volcanic field

Climbing
- Easiest route: trail hike

Whitewater Baldy is the highest point of the Mogollon Mountains and the 3rd highest mountain in Southern New Mexico, after Sierra Blanca Peak and Lincoln County's Lookout Mountain. It is located in Catron County in the Gila Wilderness, part of the Gila National Forest. It lies about 15 miles (24 km) east of the town of Glenwood (on U.S. Route 180).

Like all of the surrounding mountains, Whitewater Baldy is part of the Mogollon-Datil volcanic field, and consists of volcanic materials formed between forty and twenty-five million years ago. It is drained on the west side by Whitewater Creek, and on the east by Iron Creek.

Despite its name, Whitewater Baldy is forested up to its summit. It can be accessed by trail from the west along the Crest Trail (Forest Trail 182). It can also be accessed from the east side of the Gila Wilderness.

The area was severely impacted by the Whitewater-Baldy Complex Fire in 2012.
