= Battle of Little Dry Creek =

Engagement during Geronimo's War

- Part of the Apache Wars
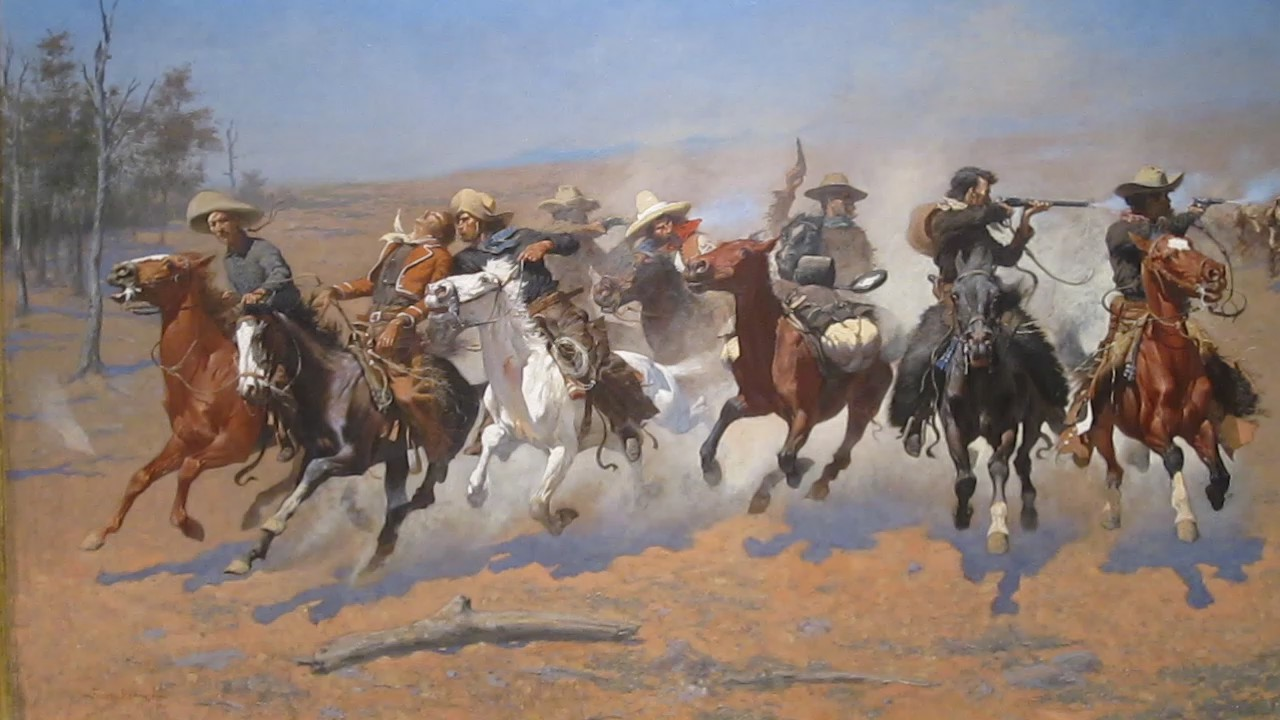
- "A Dash for the Timber" by Frederic Remington depicting American cavalry fighting Apaches.
Date	December 19, 1885
Location	near Pleasanton, Little Dry Creek, New Mexico
Result	Successful Apache ambush

Belligerents
United States	Apache

Commanders and leaders
Samuel W. Fountain	Josanie

Strength
20 cavalry 10 native scouts	10 warriors

Casualties and losses
5 killed 2 wounded	None

The Battle of Little Dry Creek was a skirmish during Geronimo's War. Chiricahua Apache warriors were raiding in the Arizona and New Mexico border area when they ambushed a larger force of United States Army troops and Navajo Scouts near Pleasanton.

== Battle ==
On December 19, 1885, First Lieutenant Samuel W. Fountain was in command of nineteen men of the 8th Cavalry and ten Navajos in between Big Dry Creek and Little Dry Creek. The group was searching in the Mogollon Mountains for the Apache leader Josanie who, with his band, was responsible for the deaths of six scouts and civilians. Two groups of Apaches, less than thirty in total, rendezvoused in the Florida Mountains in November but by the time Fountain found them there were only nine warriors with Josanie. While returning to Fort Bayard for supplies, the Americans and Navajos had just reached the top of a hill next to Little Dry Creek when suddenly rifle fire came pouring in from a ridge on the far side of the road. The cavalry quickly dismounted and proceeded forward on foot but as they were crossing the road, Apache fire hit and killed a private named Wishart, said to be the strongest of the party. Additional shots hit and killed another private named Gibson and a corporal was wounded.

The cavalry's advance was stopped and when Lieutenant Fountain turned around to order his scouts into battle, they were gone. Fountain assumed they had deserted until they reappeared and drove the Apaches from the ridge, but, by that time army surgeon Thomas J. C. Maddox was hit and wounded before receiving a second round in the head which killed him. Lieutenant Rosey C. Cabell was slightly wounded as well along with a blacksmith named Collins who died sometime the following day. The Apaches retreated to the west without loss; the Americans and Navajo were in control of the field but the Apaches had successfully ambushed a superior force without losses on their own side and they escaped without being pursued.

== See also ==
- Navajo Wars
- Comanche Wars

== Bibliography ==
- Michno, Gregory (2003). Encyclopedia of Indian wars: western battles and skirmishes, 1850-1890. Mountain Press Publishing. ISBN 0-87842-468-7.
