= Mogollon, New Mexico =

Ghost town in the United States

- Ghost town
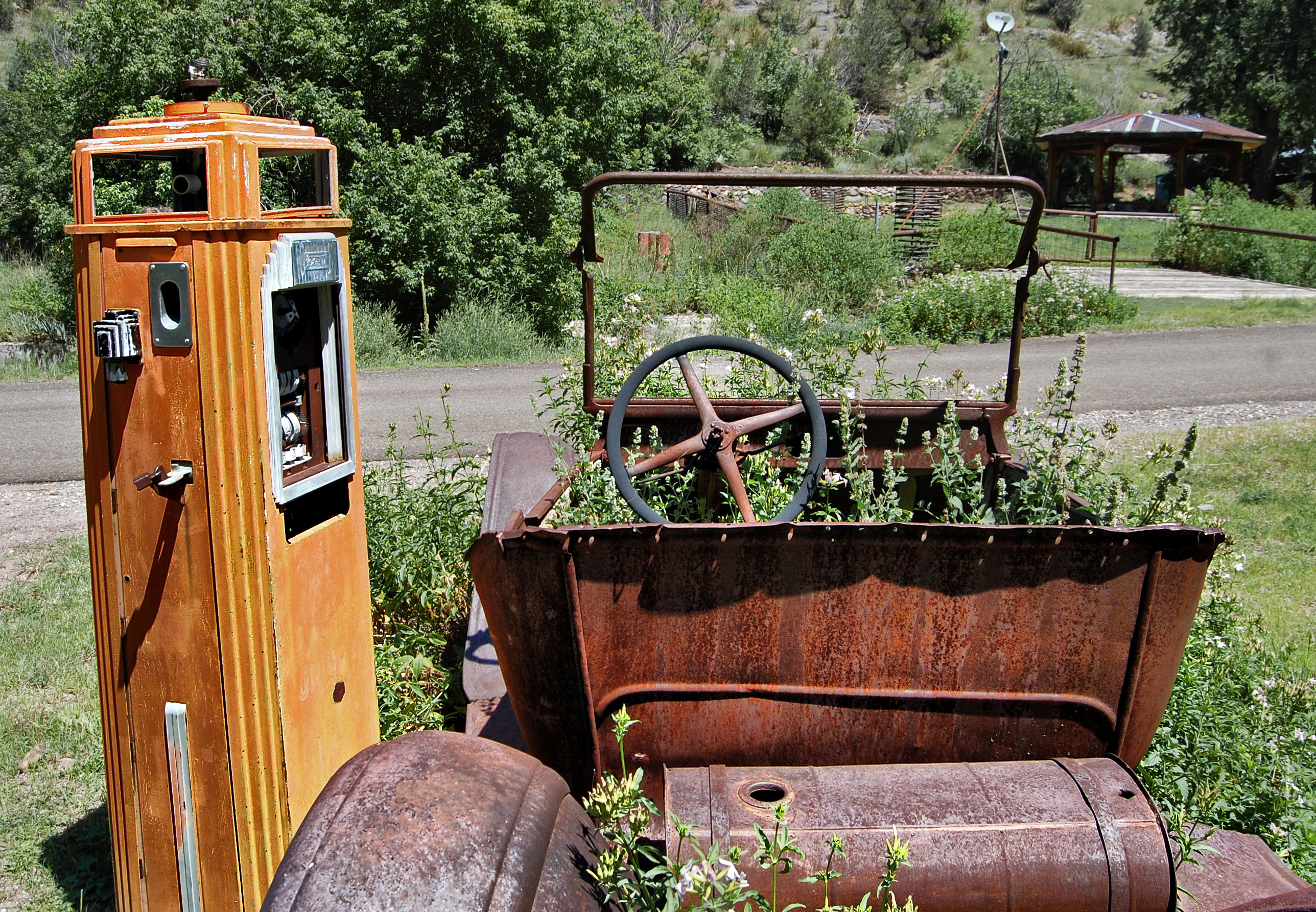
- Street scene in the Mogollon Historic District

- Location within the state of New Mexico Mogollon (the United States)
- Coordinates: 33°23′48″N 108°47′39″W
- Country: United States
- State: New Mexico
- County: Catron

Population (2000)
  - Total: 0
- Time zone: UTC-5 (Mountain (MST))
  - Summer (DST): MDT
- Area code: 575

- Mogollon Historic District
- U.S. National Register of Historic Places
- U.S. Historic district
- NM State Register of Cultural Properties
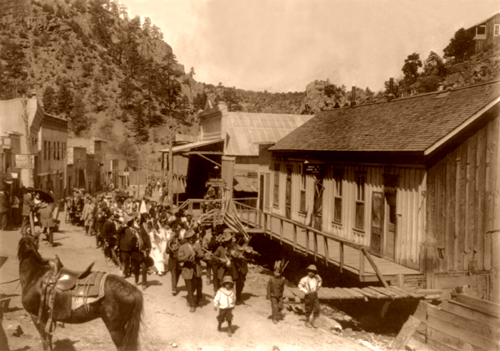
- Cinco de Mayo celebration in Mogollon, 1914

- Location within New Mexico Location within the United States
- Location: NM 78/Bursum Rd., Mogollon, New Mexico
- Area: 33 acres (13 ha)
- Built: 1889
- NRHP reference No.: 87001541
- NMSRCP No.: 38

Significant dates
- Added to NRHP: September 10, 1987
- Designated NMSRCP: February 21, 1969

Mogollon, also called the Mogollon Historic District, is a former mining town located in the Mogollon Mountains in Catron County, New Mexico, United States. Located east of Glenwood and Alma, it was founded in the 1880s at the bottom of Silver Creek Canyon to support the gold and silver mines in the surrounding mountains. The "Little Fannie" mine became the most important employer for the town. During the 1890s, Mogollon had a transient population of between 3,000 and 6,000 miners. Because of its isolation, it had a reputation as one of the wildest mining towns in the West. Today Mogollon is listed as Fannie Hill Mill and Company Town Historic District on the National Register of Historic Places.

== History ==
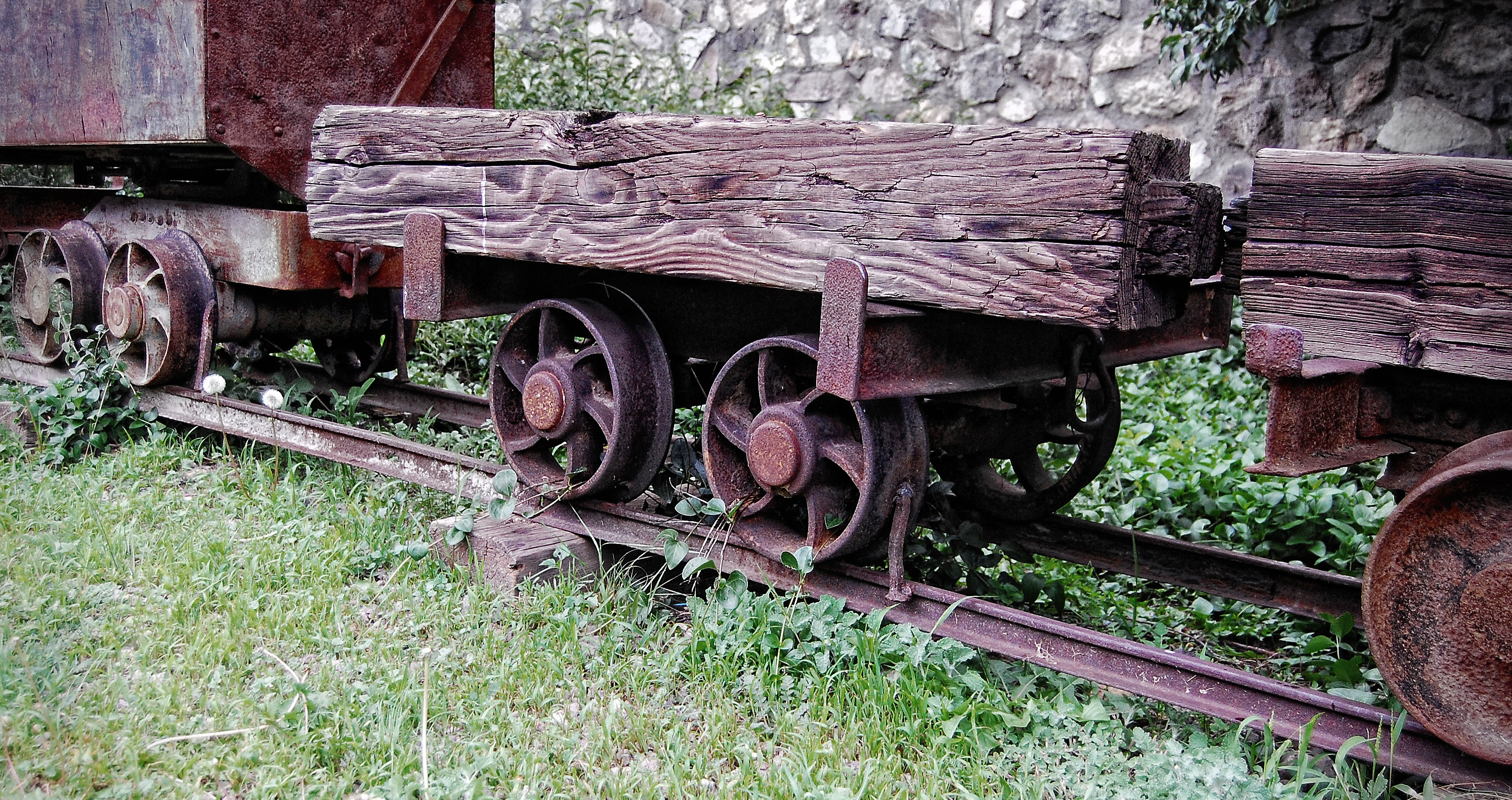
Old mine cars, Mogollon

In the 1870s, Sergeant James C. Cooney of Fort Bayard found a rich strand of gold in the Gila Mountains near the future site of Mogollon. A miner named John Eberle built the first cabin in Mogollon in 1889, after mines were developed in Silver Creek, which runs through the town. A jail and post office opened in 1890, and the first school was added in 1892. During this period of growth, Mogollon absorbed the population of nearby Cooney, and helped towns like Glenwood, Gila and Cliff grow because of their locations along the trail to the town. Between 1872 and 1873 the stagecoach from Mogollon to Silver City was robbed 23 times by the same assailant. He was eventually apprehended by agents of the Wells Fargo.

In 1909, the population of Mogollon was about 2,000. That same year the town had five saloons, two restaurants, four merchandise stores, two hotels and several brothels located in two red light districts. The town also had a photographer, the Midway Theatre, an ice maker, and a bakery. The Silver City and Mogollon Stage Line provided daily service, hauling passengers, freight, gold, and silver bullion 80 miles between the two towns in almost 15 hours.

By 1915, payroll in Mogollon was $75,000 monthly. The community expanded to a population of 1,500 that year, with electricity, water, and telephone facilities. The school offered education to about 300 students.

From early in its life, Mogollon was plagued by a series of fires and floods. The first big fire of 1894 wiped out most of the town buildings, which were made of wood. Fires followed in 1904, 1910, 1915, and 1942. Citizens usually immediately rebuilt, each time using more stone and adobe. Floods rushed through Silver Creek in 1894, 1896, 1899, and 1914. They washed away mine tailings, dumps, bridges, houses, and people.

Over 20 mines were built in the Mogollon area. By 1914 the mining district produced approximately $1.5 million of gold and silver, about 40% of New Mexico's precious metals for that year. In their lifetime, over 18 million ounces of silver were taken from the mines of the Mogollon Mountains, which was one-quarter of New Mexico's total production. Close to $20 million in gold, silver and copper were extracted, with silver accounting for about two-thirds of the total. Many regarded Silver City as merely a railhead for Mogollon's eight-team freight wagons packed with gold and silver ore.

As the ore grade decreased, so did profits, and by 1930 the population in had dropped to a reported 200. By 1940 mining activity had drastically decreased. The Fanny Mill was the only local mill to process the ore in Mogollon, so the closure of the Fanny mines in 1942 also meant the closure of the others, which previously took their ore to Fannie. A brief and minor resurgence occurred during World War II, as stagnant mines across the country began to produce needed minerals and precious metals to fuel the wartime manufacturing boom. Mining production has ceased since then.

In 1973, a Spaghetti Western called My Name is Nobody, starring Henry Fonda and Terence Hill, was filmed in Mogollon. A saloon and general store in town were built as part of the movie set.

With refining technology advancement, some attempts have been made to resume operations. In the 1980s, Challenge Mining Company was testing ore concentrations but the project never took off. By 2023, Canadian mineral exploration company Summa Silver acquired 7,730 acres of claims to the mining district in Mogollon. Testing has found high-grade ore, and Summa has ambitions to begin mining pending future results.

Today the town has several private homes and a few small businesses, including the Silver Creek Inn, which operates in a former boarding lodge called the Mogollon House built by Frank Lauderbaugh in 1885. The establishment is reportedly filled with ghosts from the mining era.

== Mogollon historic district ==
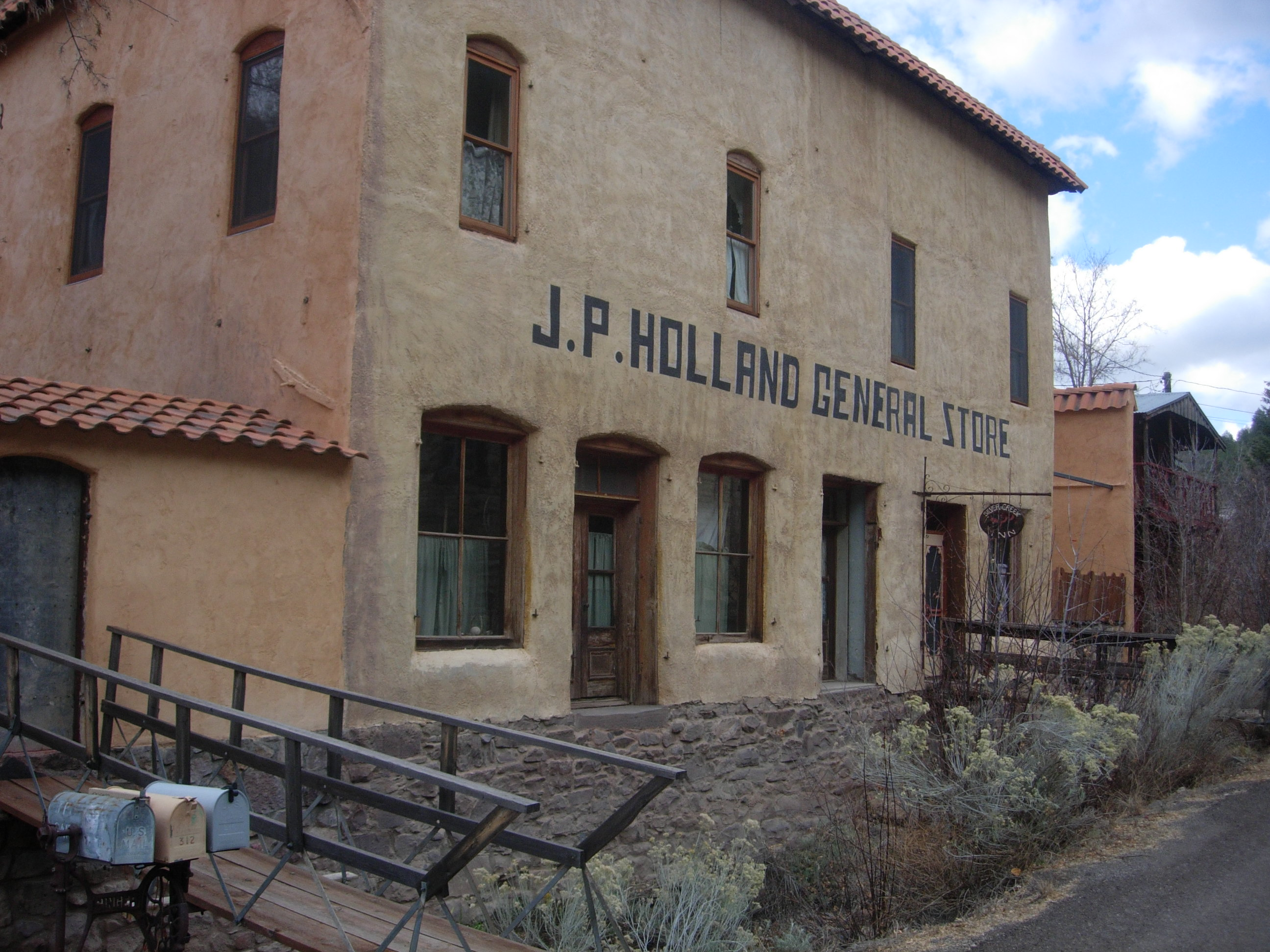
Recent photo of J.P. Holland General Store

The entire Mogollon community was added to the National Register of Historic Places as Fannie Hill Mill and Company Town Historic District in 1987. It was cited for its industrial and architectural legacy from 1875 through 1949.

== Education ==
It is in the Reserve Independent School District.

== See also ==
- National Register of Historic Places listings in Catron County, New Mexico
