= Black Mountain (Catron County, New Mexico) =

Mountain of the Black Range in New Mexico, USA

- Location within New Mexico

Highest point
- Elevation: 10,889 ft (3,319 m) NAVD 88
- Prominence: 1,367 ft (417 m)
- Coordinates: 33°22′41″N 108°13′38″W

Geography
- Location: Catron County, New Mexico
- Parent range: Black Range
- Topo map: USGS Black Mountain

Black Mountain is a mountain located in Catron County, New Mexico, on the northern boundary of the Gila Wilderness and in the Gila National Forest.

Black Mountain stands within the watershed of the Gila River, which drains into the Colorado River and thence into the Gulf of California in Mexico. The eastern and northern slopes of Black Mountain drain into the East Fork of the Gila River; the western and southern sides drain into the Middle Fork.

Currently (February 2014) the Forest Service web page states that the summit lookout tower is closed. The area was severely impacted by the Miller fire in 2011 but the cause of the closure is not stated on the Forest Service web page.

The Black Mountain Lookout Cabin is listed on the National Register of Historic Places.
