= Frisco shootout =

1884 Old West gunfight in New Mexico

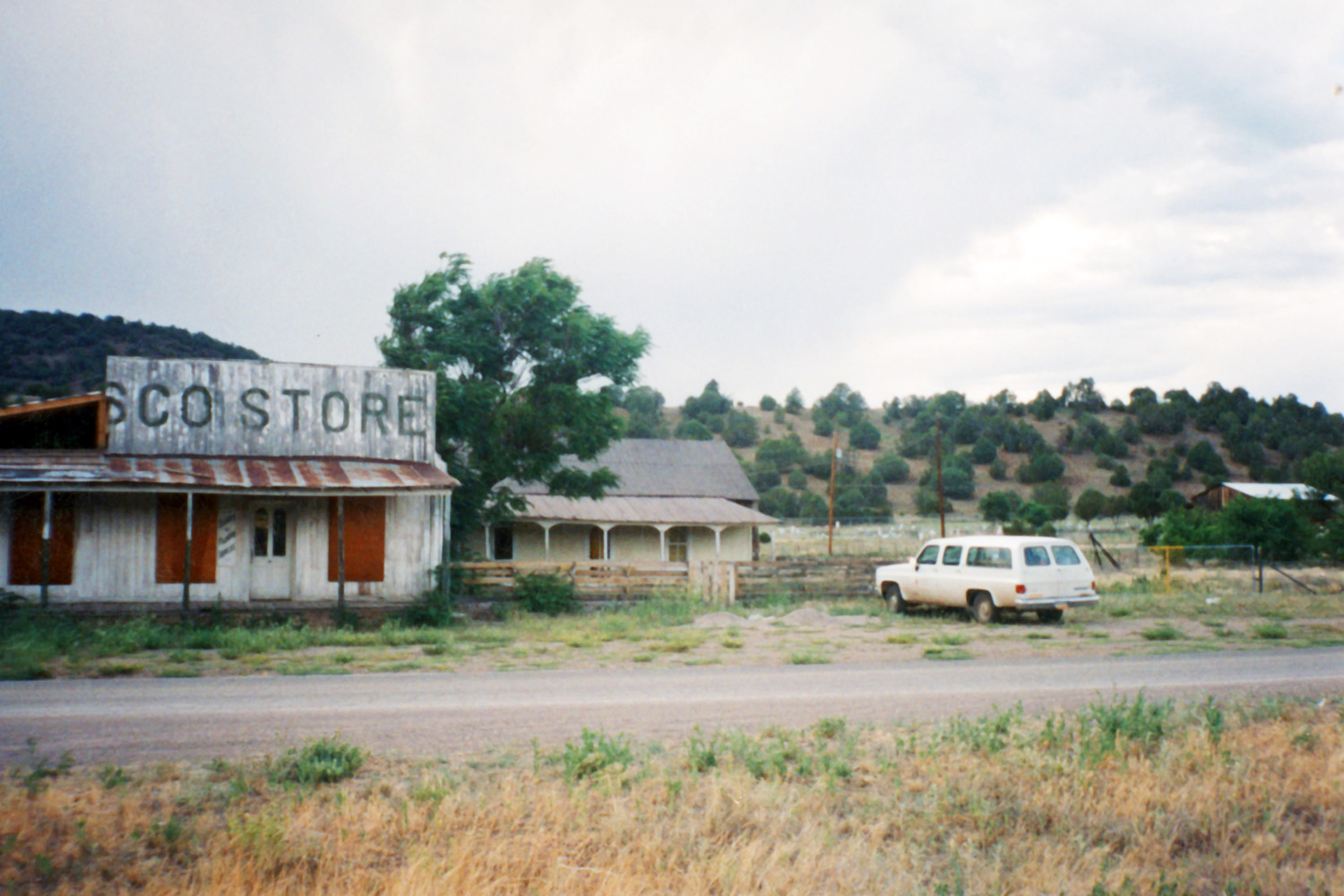
- The Frisco Store in Lower Frisco Plaza.
- Date: December 1–2, 1884
- Location: Reserve, New Mexico Territory, United States
- Participants: Elfego Baca
- Outcome: Cowboys retreat
- Deaths: 4
- Injuries: 8

The Frisco shootout was an Old West gunfight that began on December 1, 1884, involving lawman Elfego Baca. The shootout happened in Reserve, New Mexico, and stemmed from Baca's arrest of a cowboy, Charlie McCarty, who had been shooting into the air and into buildings at random while intoxicated.

== Shootout ==
Shortly after the arrest was made, Baca was confronted by a large number of the cowboy's friends. Baca took refuge in the house of local resident Geronimo Armijo. An intense shootout ensued, during which the cowboys increased in number to around eighty men. Legend has it that the cowboys fired more than 4,000 rounds into the house, but there is little way of confirming just how many rounds were fired exactly. Baca was not wounded by any of the rounds fired, but did return fire killing four of the cowboys, and wounding eight others. The standoff ended when the cowboys were unable to acquire more ammunition. With their ammunition supply depleted, they simply withdrew. The fight had lasted thirty-six hours.

Charlie McCarty served his time in jail for disturbing the peace and drunkenness, and was released. The cowboys pursued Baca through legal means, attempting to have him imprisoned for the killing of their four comrades. In May 1885, Baca was indicted for the killing of one of the men. However, when the door of Geronimo Armijo's house was introduced as evidence, having over four hundred bullet holes in it, Baca was acquitted. He went on to become a licensed attorney and a Deputy US Marshal.

== Memorial project ==
On May 24, 2008, the Elfego Baca Foundation opened a memorial at 101 Main St Reserve, New Mexico, in honor of Baca.
