= Black Mountain Lookout Cabin =

- U.S. National Register of Historic Places
- Location within New Mexico
- Location: Gila National Forest, Black Mountain, New Mexico
- Coordinates: 33°22′41″N 108°13′36″W
- Area: less than one acre
- Built: 1925
- MPS: National Forest Fire Lookouts in the Southwestern Region TR
- NRHP reference No.: 87002474
- Added to NRHP: January 28, 1988

The Black Mountain Lookout Cabin in Gila National Forest in or near Black Mountain, New Mexico, was built in 1925. It was listed on the National Register of Historic Places in 1988.

Black Mountain, Catron County, New Mexico

It is located on Black Mountain (Catron County, New Mexico)

Pics only
