= James C. Cooney =

US soldier killed in 1880 during the Alma Massacre, New Mexico Territory

James C. Cooney was a sergeant of the U.S. Army in the 8th U.S. Cavalry when he found large silver and gold reserves in the Mogollon Mountains of Catron County, New Mexico. He was transferred to Fort Bayard, near Silver City, New Mexico in 1870. While scouting for the 8th U.S. Cavalry north of Mogollon and east of Alma, he discovered silver ore in the Mogollon Mountains. He began working the claim after leaving the Army in 1876.

During a raid on settlers' homes in the Alma Massacre in 1880, Cooney was killed by local Chiricahua Apache led by Victorio.

== See also ==
- Cooney's Tomb
- Cooney, New Mexico
