= Blue Range Wilderness =

Protected area in New Mexico, US

- IUCN category Ib (wilderness area)
- Location within New Mexico Location within the United States
- Location: Catron County, New Mexico, US
- Nearest city: Reserve, New Mexico
- Coordinates: 33°24′0″N 108°56′0″W
- Area: 29,304 acres (11,859 ha)
- Established: 1980
- Governing body: United States Forest Service

Blue Range Wilderness, along with Aldo Leopold Wilderness and Gila Wilderness, is part of Gila National Forest. It is located on the western border of New Mexico and west of U.S. Route 180 between Reserve and Glenwood. The wilderness is crossed by the Mogollon Rim. It became part of the National Wilderness Preservation System in 1980.

It is home to wildlife species including black bear, pronghorn, bald eagle, peregrine falcon, elk, white-tailed deer, osprey, mule deer, bobcat, spotted owl, cougar, Mexican wolf, gray fox, white-nosed coati, collared peccary, bighorn sheep, and wild turkey.

The adjacent and larger Blue Range Primitive Area of Apache-Sitgreaves National Forest in Arizona was also recommended for Wilderness status in 1971, but only the New Mexico portion has been acted upon by Congress.
