= Reserve Independent School District =

School district in New Mexico, United States

The Reserve Independent School District is a school district headquartered in Reserve, New Mexico.

It includes the southern portion of Catron County. Communities in the district include, in addition to Reserve: Alma, Apache Creek, Aragon, Cruzville, Glenwood, Lower Frisco, Luna, Middle Frisco, Mogollon, Pleasanton, Rancho Grande, and Rivers.
