= Cruzville, New Mexico =

- Census-designated place
- Location within the state of New Mexico
- Coordinates: 33°48′36″N 108°40′06″W
- Country: United States
- State: New Mexico
- County: Catron

Area
  - Total: 2.55 sq mi (6.61 km^{2})
  - Land: 2.55 sq mi (6.61 km^{2})
  - Water: 0 sq mi (0.00 km^{2})
- Elevation: 6,359 ft (1,938 m)

Population (2020)
  - Total: 74
  - Density: 29.0/sq mi (11.19/km^{2})
- Time zone: UTC-5 (Mountain (MST))
  - Summer (DST): MDT
- Area code: 575
- GNIS feature ID: 2584084

Cruzville is a census-designated place in Catron County, New Mexico, United States, 9 miles (14 km) northeast of Reserve. It is located in the Apache National Forest. As of the 2020 census, Cruzville had a population of 74.

== Demographics ==
Historical population
Census	Pop.	Note	%±
2020	74		—
U.S. Decennial Census

== Education ==
It is in the Reserve Independent School District.
