= Middle Frisco, New Mexico =

- Census-designated place
- Location within New Mexico
- Coordinates: 33°41′42″N 108°45′50″W
- Country: United States
- State: New Mexico
- County: Catron

Area
  - Total: 0.60 sq mi (1.56 km^{2})
  - Land: 0.54 sq mi (1.41 km^{2})
  - Water: 0.054 sq mi (0.14 km^{2})
- Elevation: 5,725 ft (1,745 m)

Population (2020)
  - Total: 51
  - Density: 93/sq mi (36.1/km^{2})
- Time zone: UTC-7 (Mountain (MST))
  - Summer (DST): UTC-6 (MDT)
- Area code: 575
- GNIS feature ID: 2584154

Middle Frisco is a census-designated place in Catron County, New Mexico, United States. As of the 2020 census, Middle Frisco had a population of 51. The community is part of San Francisco Plaza.

== Geography ==
According to the U.S. Census Bureau, the community has an area of 0.6 square miles (1.6 km^{2}); 0.545 square miles (1.41 km^{2}) is land and 0.055 square miles (0.14 km^{2}) is water.

== Demographics ==
Historical population
Census	Pop.	Note	%±
2020	51		—
U.S. Decennial Census

== Education ==
It is in the Reserve Independent School District.
