= Lower Frisco, New Mexico =

- Census-designated place
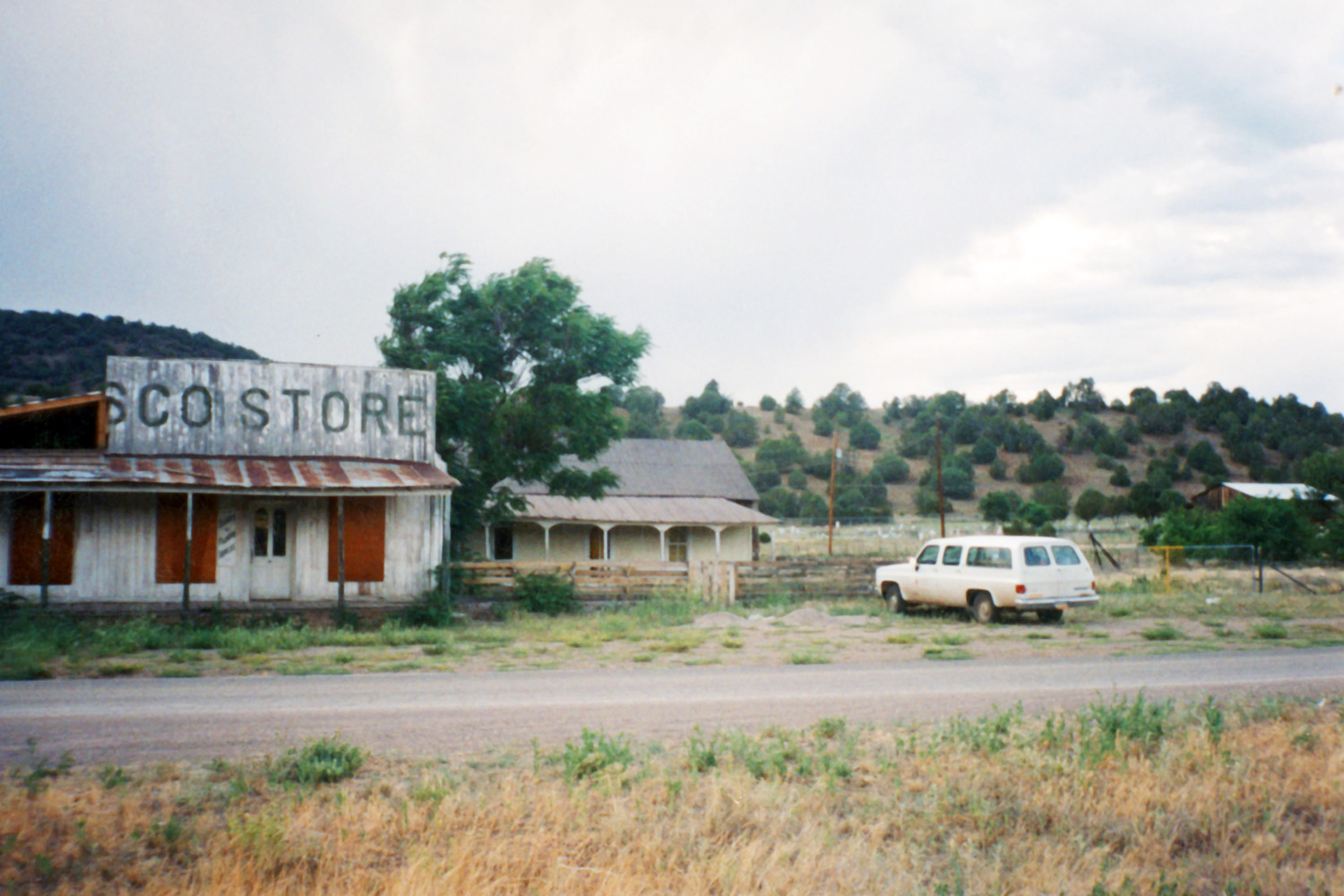
- The Frisco Store in Lower Frisco

- Location within New Mexico
- Coordinates: 33°39′05″N 108°47′22″W
- Country: United States
- State: New Mexico
- County: Catron

Area
  - Total: 1.01 sq mi (2.62 km^{2})
  - Land: 1.01 sq mi (2.61 km^{2})
  - Water: 0.0039 sq mi (0.01 km^{2})
- Elevation: 5,611 ft (1,710 m)

Population (2020)
  - Total: 60
  - Density: 59.5/sq mi (22.97/km^{2})
- Time zone: UTC-7 (Mountain (MST))
  - Summer (DST): UTC-6 (MDT)
- Area code: 575
- GNIS feature ID: 2584146

Lower Frisco is a census-designated place in Catron County, New Mexico, United States. As of the 2020 census, Lower Frisco had a population of 60. The community is part of San Francisco Plaza.

== Geography ==
According to the U.S. Census Bureau, the community has an area of 1.010 square miles (2.62 km^{2}); 1.008 square miles (2.61 km^{2}) is land and 0.002 square miles (0.0052 km^{2}) is water.

== Demographics ==
Historical population
Census	Pop.	Note	%±
2020	60		—
U.S. Decennial Census

== Education ==
It is in the Reserve Independent School District.
