= New Mexico State Road 435 =

State highway in New Mexico, United States

State Road 435

Route information
- Maintained by NMDOT
- Length: 5.206 mi (8.378 km)

Major junctions
- Southern end: Reserve Beaverhead Road near Reserve
- Northern end: NM 12 in Reserve

Location
- Country: United States
- State: New Mexico
- Counties: Catron

Highway system
- New Mexico State Highway System; Interstate; US; State; Scenic
← NM 434	→ NM 436

State Road 435 (NM 435) is a 5.206-mile-long (8.378 km) state highway in the US state of New Mexico. NM 435's northern terminus is at NM 12 in Reserve, and the southern terminus is a continuation as Reserve Beauerhead Road south-southwest of Reserve.

== Major intersections ==
The entire route is in Catron County.

Location	mi	km	Destinations	Notes
Reserve	0.000	0.000	NM 12	Northern terminus
	5.206	8.378	Reserve Beauerhead Road	Southern terminus, continues south as Reserve Beauerhead Road
1.000 mi = 1.609 km; 1.000 km = 0.621 mi
