= Rancho Grande, New Mexico =

- Census-designated place
- Location within New Mexico
- Coordinates: 33°40′58″N 108°51′29″W
- Country: United States
- State: New Mexico
- County: Catron

Area
  - Total: 0.44 sq mi (1.13 km^{2})
  - Land: 0.42 sq mi (1.10 km^{2})
  - Water: 0.012 sq mi (0.03 km^{2})
- Elevation: 6,345 ft (1,934 m)

Population (2020)
  - Total: 96
  - Density: 227.0/sq mi (87.64/km^{2})
- Time zone: UTC-7 (Mountain (MST))
  - Summer (DST): UTC-6 (MDT)
- Area code: 575
- GNIS feature ID: 2584191

Rancho Grande is a census-designated place in Catron County, New Mexico, United States. As of the 2020 census, Rancho Grande had a population of 96. The community is located along U.S. Route 180.

== Geography ==
According to the U.S. Census Bureau, the community has an area of 0.436 square miles (1.13 km^{2}); 0.425 square miles (1.10 km^{2}) is land and 0.011 square miles (0.028 km^{2}) is water.

== Demographics ==
Historical population
Census	Pop.	Note	%±
2020	96		—
U.S. Decennial Census

== Education ==
It is in the Reserve Independent School District.
