= Pleasanton, New Mexico =

- Census-designated place
- Location within the state of New Mexico
- Coordinates: 33°16′20″N 108°52′32″W
- Country: United States
- State: New Mexico
- County: Catron

Area
  - Total: 1.58 sq mi (4.09 km^{2})
  - Land: 1.52 sq mi (3.94 km^{2})
  - Water: 0.054 sq mi (0.14 km^{2})
- Elevation: 4,607 ft (1,404 m)

Population (2020)
  - Total: 97
  - Density: 63.7/sq mi (24.59/km^{2})
- Time zone: UTC-5 (Mountain (MST))
  - Summer (DST): MDT
- Area code: 575
- GNIS feature ID: 2584182

Pleasanton is a census-designated place in the Williams Valley of Catron County, south of Glenwood and north of Cliff, in the U.S. state of New Mexico. As of the 2020 census, Pleasanton had a population of 97. It was renowned as a safehaven for Mormon polygamists for several years.

== History ==
Pleasanton was founded by Mormons in 1882. The 24th child of Mormon polygamist Jacob Hamblin was born there in 1884. Hamblin died of malarial fever in 1886. Other polygamists, including William Maxwell, made their home in Pleasanton specifically to evade the law.

In 1885 a band of Chiricahua Apache killed a group of U.S. Army soldiers in a triple cross-fire trap near Pleasanton.

== Education ==
It is in the Reserve Independent School District.

== Demographics ==
Historical population
Census	Pop.	Note	%±
2020	97		—
U.S. Decennial Census

== See also ==
- Mormon Corridor
