= Elfego Baca =

Sheriff in New Mexico, US (1865–1945)

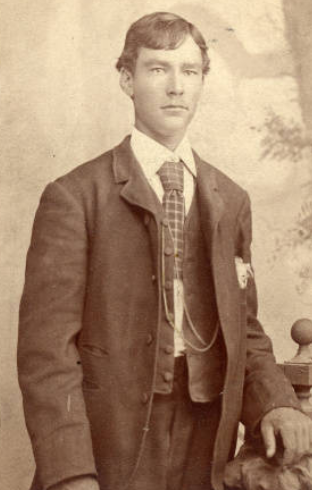
- Elfego Baca in 1883
- Born: February 10, 1865; Socorro, New Mexico Territory
- Died: August 27, 1945 (aged 80); Albuquerque, New Mexico
- Occupations: Gunfighter, sheriff, lawyer, politician
- Political party: Republican Party
- Family: Hispanos of New Mexico; Baca family of New Mexico

Elfego Baca (February 10, 1865 – August 27, 1945) was a gunfighter, law enforcement officer, lawyer, and politician in New Mexico, who became an American folk hero of the later years of the New Mexico Territory frontier. His goal in life was to be a peace officer, and for "the outlaws to hear [his] steps a block away". He is known for his involvement in an 1884 shootout in Frisco (now Reserve), New Mexico, as well as later fictionalized representations of his life in Westerns released during the mid-20th century.

== Early life ==
Baca was born in 1865 in Socorro, New Mexico, to Francisco and Juana Maria Baca. His family moved to Topeka, Kansas, when he was a young child. Upon his mother's death in 1880, Baca returned with his father to Belen, New Mexico, where his father became a marshal. In 1884, at the age of 19, Baca acquired some guns and became a deputy sheriff (whether through purchasing a badge or by being appointed is unclear) in Socorro County, New Mexico.

== Frisco shootout ==
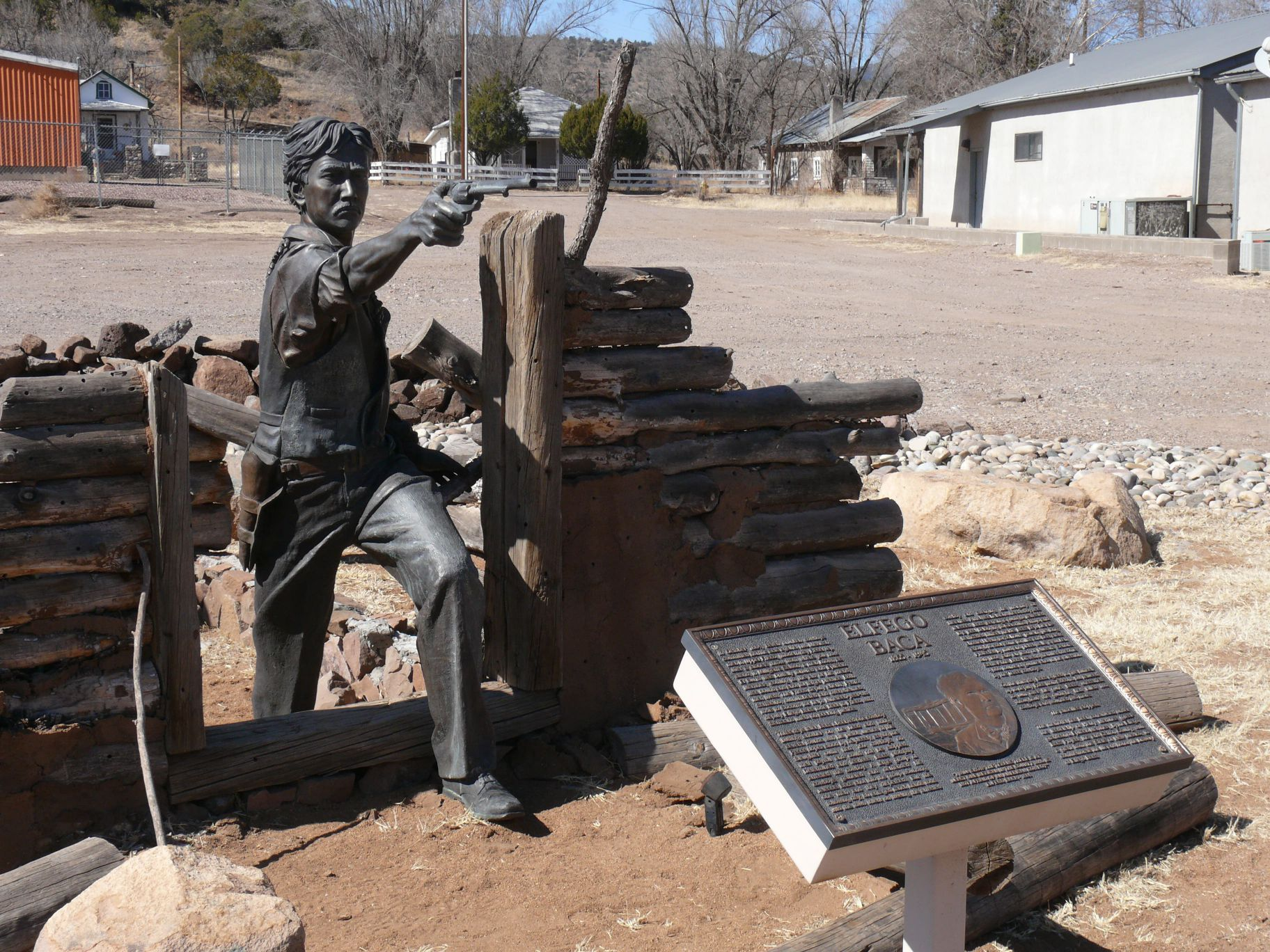
Statue of Elfego Baca in Reserve, New Mexico

In October 1884, in the town of Middle San Francisco Plaza (now Reserve, New Mexico), Baca arrested a drunk cowboy named Charlie McCarty, flashing his badge at him and taking his gun. McCarty's fellow cowboys tried to stop Baca, but he fought back, killing the horse of John Slaughter's foreman, which fell on him and killed him, and shooting another cowboy in the knee. Subsequently, Justice of the Peace Ted White granted McCarty's freedom and summoned Bert Hearne, a rancher from Spur Lake Ranch, to bring Baca back to the justice for questioning relating to what he considered murder. After Baca refused to come out of the adobe jail, Hearne broke down the door and ordered Baca to come out with his hands up. Soon after that, shots volleyed from the jail and hit Hearne in the stomach, mortally wounding him.

A standoff with the cowboys ensued. The number of cowboys who gathered has been disputed, with villagers at the scene reporting about 40 present, while Baca himself later claimed there had been at least 80. The cowboys are said to have fired more than 4,000 shots into the house, until the adobe building was full of holes. However, none of the bullets struck Baca; the floor of the home is said to have been slightly lower than ground level, allowing him to escape injury.

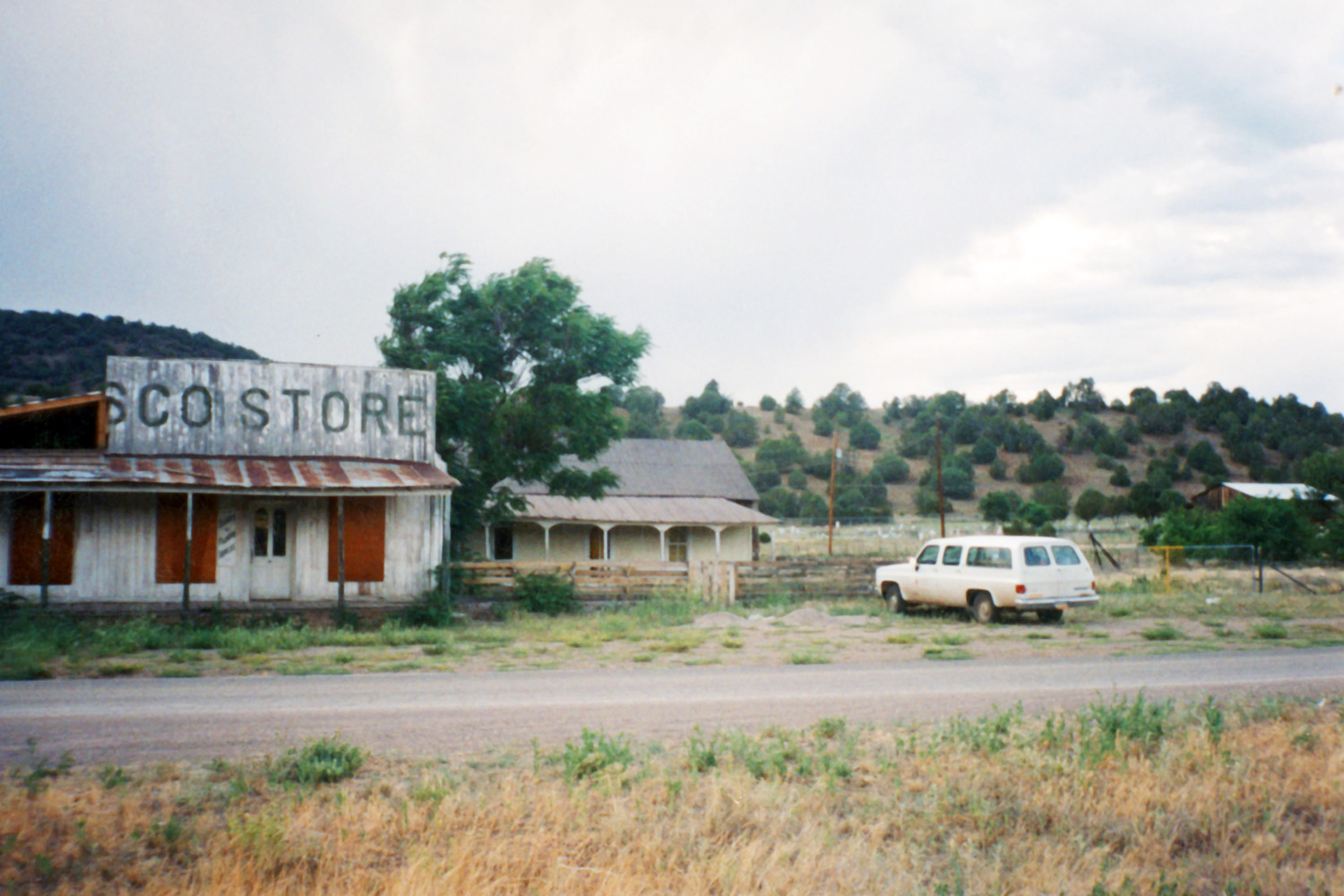
The Frisco Store in Middle Frisco Plaza, c. 1993

After about 33 hours and roughly 4,000 rounds fired, the battle ended when Francisquito Naranjo persuaded Baca to surrender. In May 1885, Baca was charged with murder for the death of John Slaughter's foreman and Bert Hearne, and was jailed awaiting trial. In August 1885, Baca was acquitted after the door of Armijo's house was entered as evidence. It had more than 400 bullet holes in it. Purportedly, Baca's defense attorney had false documentation to prove Baca's legal deputization, as Baca's biography suggests he deputized himself just before the arrest of Charlie McCarty.

== Law enforcement career ==
Baca officially became the sheriff of Socorro County and secured indictments for the arrest of the area's lawbreakers. Instead of ordering his deputies to pursue the wanted men, he sent each of the accused a letter. It said, "I have a warrant here for your arrest. Please come in by March 15 and give yourself up. If you don't, I'll know you intend to resist arrest, and I will feel justified in shooting you on sight when I come after you." Most of the offenders turned themselves in voluntarily.

In 1888, Baca became a U.S. marshal. He served for two years and then began studying law. In December 1894, he was admitted to the bar by Judge A.A. Freeman and briefly joined Freeman's Socorro law firm in February 1895. He practiced law on San Antonio Street in El Paso between 1902 and 1904.

== Political life ==
Baca held a succession of public offices, including county clerk, mayor, and school superintendent of Socorro County and district attorney for Socorro and Sierra Counties. In his book The Shooters, historian Leon Metz writes, "most reports say he was the best peace officer Socorro ever had."

From 1913 to 1916, Baca served as the official U.S. representative of Victoriano Huerta's government during the Mexican Revolution. In April 1915, Baca was charged with criminal conspiracy for allegedly masterminding the November 1914 escape of Mexican general José Inés Salazar from the Albuquerque jail. Successfully defended by New Mexican lawyer and politician Octaviano Larrazolo, Baca's reputation grew among Southwestern residents.

When New Mexico became a state in 1912, Baca ran for Congress as a Republican. Although he was unsuccessful, he remained a valued political figure because of his ability to turn out the vote among the Hispanic population. Working at times as a private detective, Baca also took a job as a bouncer in a casino across the border in Ciudad Juárez, Mexico.

Baca worked closely with New Mexico's longtime Senator Bronson Cutting as a political investigator and wrote a weekly column in Spanish praising Cutting's work on behalf of local Hispanics. Baca considered running for governor despite his declining health, but he failed to secure the Democratic Party's nomination for district attorney in 1944.

Metz, his biographer, wrote: "Elfego was, and is, controversial. He drank too much; talked too much ... he had a weakness for wild women. He was often arrogant, and, of course, he showed no compunction about killing people." On his 75th birthday, Baca told the Albuquerque Tribune that as a lawyer he had defended 30 people charged with murder and that only one went to the penitentiary.

In July 1936, several years before his death, Janet Smith conducted an interview with Baca. Her notes can be found in the Library of Congress, Manuscript Division, WPA Federal Writers' Project Collection. Baca told Smith, "I never wanted to kill anybody, but if a man had it in his mind to kill me, I made it my business to get him first."

== Legends ==
Another legend says that Baca stole a pistol from Pancho Villa and the angry Villa put a price of $30,000 on Baca's head. One often-told story says that once when he was practicing law in Albuquerque, Baca received a telegram from a client in El Paso, Texas. "Need you at once," it said. "Have just been charged with murder," to which Baca is supposed to have responded with a telegram saying, "Leaving at once with three eyewitnesses."

== Portrayal in popular media ==
In the late 1950s, Walt Disney turned Baca into the first Hispanic popular culture hero in the United States, representing him in six comic books, a feature film, and related merchandising. Disney deliberately avoided ethnic tension by presenting Baca as a generalized Western hero, portraying "a New Mexican Davy Crockett". They filmed most of the series in New Mexico, particularly Cerrillos, Socorro County, and the Albuquerque–Santa Fe–Las Vegas combined statistical area.

Starting in October 1958, Walt Disney Studios released a 10-part television serial entitled The Nine Lives of Elfego Baca, starring Robert Loggia in the title role. The serial aired as part of the anthology series Walt Disney Presents at irregular intervals from October 3, 1958, to March 25, 1960.

Disney took significant care to depict the famous siege in as authentic a manner as possible, given the known details. Among those who appeared in the series were Skip Homeier, Raymond Bailey, and I. Stanford Jolley. Episodes of the series were later edited into a 1962 movie titled Elfego Baca: Six Gun Law. The theme song's tag line was, "And the legend was that / Like el gato, "the cat" / Nine lives had Elfego Baca."

In 1966, a compilation of episodes was released as a film, Elfego Baca: Six Gun Law. It was directed by Christian Nyby and starred Robert Loggia's Elfego Baca. The film premiered in theaters in West Germany on May 20, 1966, and was later broadcast on American television with the title Elfego Baca: Attorney at Law.

Other popular culture depictions include Dynamite Entertainment's Lone Ranger and Green Hornet comic, where he cameos alongside other Western heroes including the Lone Ranger, Bat Masterson, Buffalo Bill, Wyatt Earp, Annie Oakley, Texas John Slaughter, and Black Bart.

New Mexican author Rudolfo Anaya (1937-2020) wrote four mystery novels featuring Elfego's grandson Sonny Baca of Albuquerque, New Mexico, who carries Elfego's supposed revolver; the modern stories involve sorcery and magic.

== See also ==
- Baca family of New Mexico
