= Tularosa River =

Stream in Catron County, New Mexico, U.S.

Coordinates: 33°40′38″N 108°46′34″W

The Tularosa River is a stream in Catron County, New Mexico, United States. It is a tributary of the San Francisco River.

== See also ==
- List of rivers in New Mexico
