= Reserve, New Mexico =

- Village
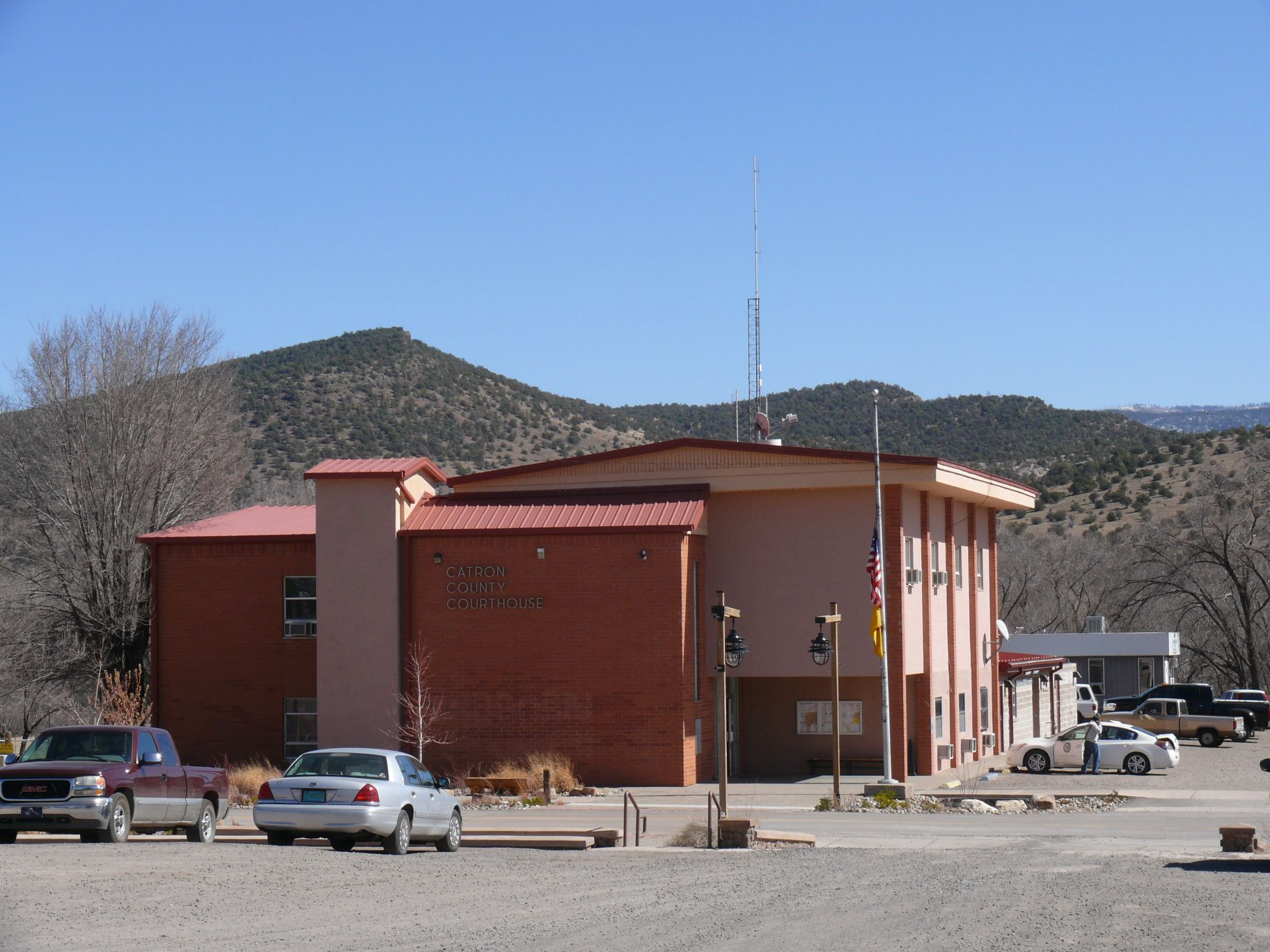
- Catron County Courthouse

- Location of Reserve, New Mexico

- Location in the United States
- Coordinates: 33°42′32″N 108°45′41″W
- Country: United States
- State: New Mexico
- County: Catron

Area
  - Total: 0.56 sq mi (1.44 km^{2})
  - Land: 0.56 sq mi (1.44 km^{2})
  - Water: 0 sq mi (0.00 km^{2})
- Elevation: 5,860 ft (1,790 m)

Population (2020)
  - Total: 293
  - Density: 525.9/sq mi (203.06/km^{2})
- Time zone: UTC-7 (Mountain (MST))
  - Summer (DST): UTC-6 (MDT)
- ZIP code: 87830
- Area code: 575
- FIPS code: 35-62620
- GNIS feature ID: 2413582

Reserve is a village in Catron County, New Mexico, United States. The town population was 293 at the 2020 census. It is the county seat of Catron County. Currently the village has two grocery stores, a hardware store, a bar, fairgrounds, and a health clinic. It is the site where Elfego Baca held off a gang of Texan cowboys who wanted to kill him for arresting cowboy Charles McCarty.

== History ==
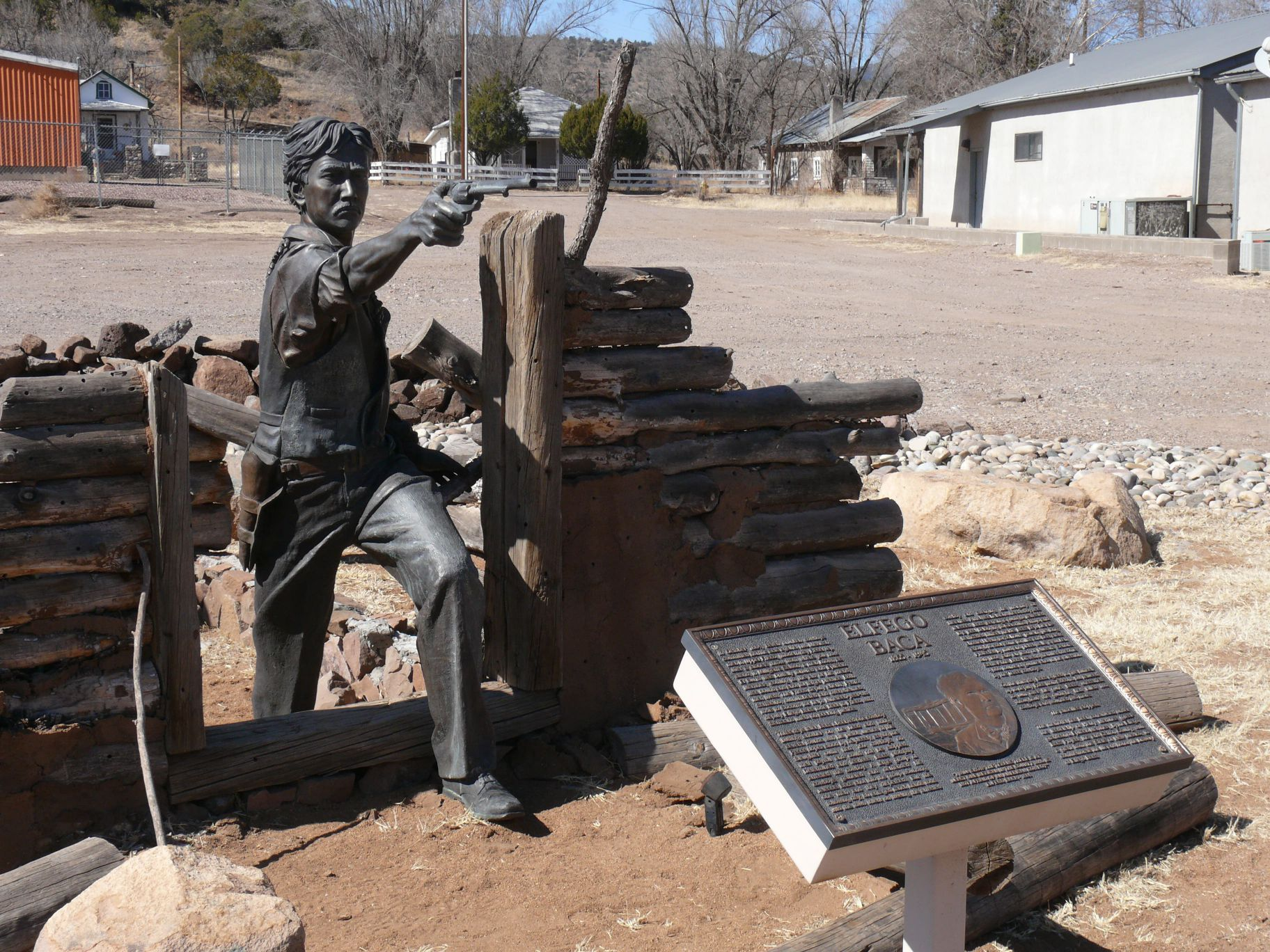
Monument to Elfego Baca

In the 1860s, Mexican-Americans established a string of villages along the San Francisco River, naming them the Upper, Lower, and Middle San Francisco Plazas. In the late 1870s Anglo settlers began arriving. They renamed Upper Frisco Plaza as Milligan's Plaza, naming it after a merchant and saloon owner.

Catron became a county in 1921. It was named after an attorney and political leader from Santa Fe, Thomas B. Catron.

Milligan's Plaza was the site of the Frisco shootout of Elfego Baca.

== Geography ==
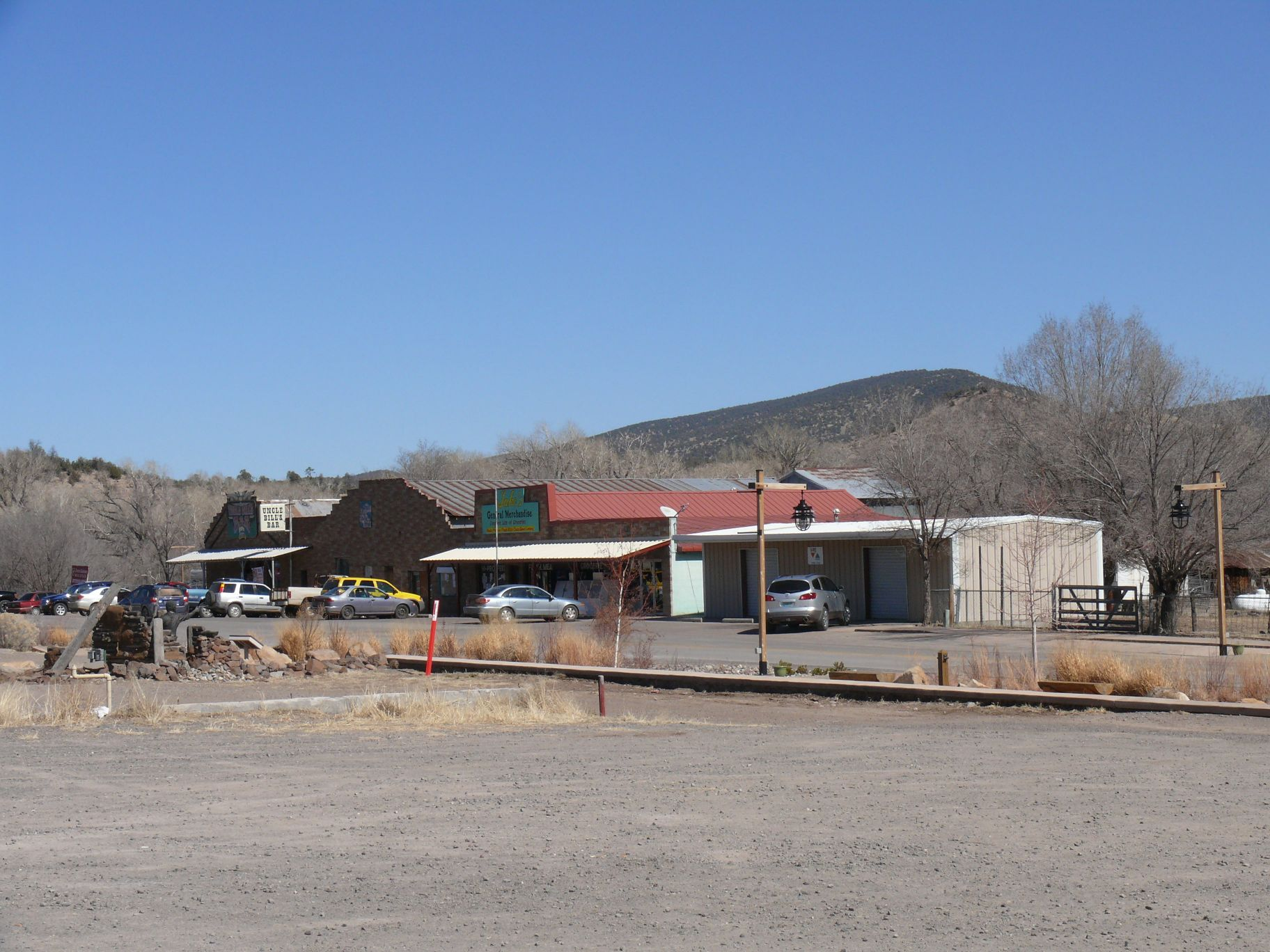
Main square in Reserve

Reserve is located in western Catron County in the valley of the San Francisco River. New Mexico State Road 12 passes through the village, leading west 7 miles (11 km) to U.S. Route 180 near Reserve Airport and northeast 67 miles (108 km) to U.S. Route 60 at Datil. NM 435 leads south through the communities of San Francisco Plaza and Lower San Francisco Plaza before ending 5 miles (8 km) south of Reserve.

Reserve is situated in the Gila National Forest about 15 mi (24 km) east of the Arizona/New Mexico border. The area includes ruins from the Mogollon and Anasazi tribes, as well as petroglyphs and historic Old West sites.

According to the United States Census Bureau, the village has a total area of 0.54 square miles (1.4 km^{2}), all land.

== Demographics ==
Historical population
Census	Pop.	Note	%±
1980	439		—
1990	319		−27.3%
2000	387		21.3%
2010	289		−25.3%
2020	293		1.4%
U.S. Decennial Census

As of the census of 2000, there were 387 people, 177 households, and 103 families residing in the village. The population density was 696.2 inhabitants per square mile (268.8/km^{2}). There were 238 housing units at an average density of 428.2 per square mile (165.3/km^{2}). The racial makeup of the village was 80.10% White, 0.52% African American, 0.52% Native American, 13.95% from other races, and 4.91% from two or more races. Hispanic or Latino of any race were 40.57% of the population.

There were 177 households, out of which 25.4% had children under the age of 18 living with them, 41.8% were married couples living together, 14.1% had a female householder with no husband present, and 41.8% were non-families. 39.0% of all households were made up of individuals, and 16.4% had someone living alone who was 65 years of age or older. The average household size was 2.14 and the average family size was 2.84.

In the village, the population was spread out, with 24.5% under the age of 18, 7.5% from 18 to 24, 20.9% from 25 to 44, 28.2% from 45 to 64, and 18.9% who were 65 years of age or older. The median age was 43 years. For every 100 females, there were 95.5 males. For every 100 females age 18 and over, there were 89.6 males.

The median income for a household in the village was $24,750, and the median income for a family was $30,536. Males had a median income of $30,833 versus $16,000 for females. The per capita income for the village was $14,612. About 14.2% of families and 17.8% of the population were below the poverty line, including 22.6% of those under age 18 and 9.1% of those age 65 or over.

== Climate ==
Reserve has a Mediterranean climate of the warm-summer type (Köppen: Csb), unusual in New Mexico. Despite having mild to hot daytime highs year round, temperatures substantially cool off during nighttime due to Reserve's high elevation and aridity. Even in the summertime, 90 degree days can cool off into the 40's. A freeze has been recorded every month of the year except August. Reserve receives most of its rainfall in the form of thunderstorms from mid-summer into fall from the North American Monsoon, which can produce hazardous flash floods very quickly. Snow usually falls once or twice a year, but melts quickly due to the high daytime temperatures.

Climate data for Reserve, New Mexico, 1991–2020 normals, extremes 1906–present
Month	Jan	Feb	Mar	Apr	May	Jun	Jul	Aug	Sep	Oct	Nov	Dec	Year
Record high °F (°C)	74 (23)	79 (26)	88 (31)	93 (34)	107 (42)	104 (40)	105 (41)	101 (38)	102 (39)	94 (34)	89 (32)	80 (27)	107 (42)
Mean maximum °F (°C)	65.7 (18.7)	68.8 (20.4)	76.1 (24.5)	82.2 (27.9)	90.5 (32.5)	98.2 (36.8)	98.9 (37.2)	95.9 (35.5)	91.1 (32.8)	84.4 (29.1)	76.3 (24.6)	67.0 (19.4)	100.4 (38.0)
Mean daily maximum °F (°C)	56.9 (13.8)	60.9 (16.1)	67.2 (19.6)	74.8 (23.8)	81.4 (27.4)	91.0 (32.8)	91.9 (33.3)	89.1 (31.7)	85.1 (29.5)	75.9 (24.4)	65.4 (18.6)	56.9 (13.8)	74.7 (23.7)
Daily mean °F (°C)	37.1 (2.8)	40.0 (4.4)	45.7 (7.6)	51.5 (10.8)	58.4 (14.7)	67.4 (19.7)	72.6 (22.6)	70.6 (21.4)	64.9 (18.3)	54.6 (12.6)	45.0 (7.2)	37.1 (2.8)	53.7 (12.1)
Mean daily minimum °F (°C)	17.3 (−8.2)	19.1 (−7.2)	24.2 (−4.3)	28.1 (−2.2)	35.3 (1.8)	43.7 (6.5)	53.3 (11.8)	52.1 (11.2)	44.7 (7.1)	33.3 (0.7)	24.5 (−4.2)	17.2 (−8.2)	32.7 (0.4)
Mean minimum °F (°C)	4.8 (−15.1)	9.9 (−12.3)	12.5 (−10.8)	16.8 (−8.4)	25.9 (−3.4)	36.0 (2.2)	45.2 (7.3)	44.6 (7.0)	33.7 (0.9)	21.1 (−6.1)	11.3 (−11.5)	3.8 (−15.7)	0.7 (−17.4)
Record low °F (°C)	−22 (−30)	−15 (−26)	−8 (−22)	10 (−12)	15 (−9)	26 (−3)	30 (−1)	32 (0)	25 (−4)	6 (−14)	−7 (−22)	−23 (−31)	−23 (−31)
Average precipitation inches (mm)	1.28 (33)	1.06 (27)	0.85 (22)	0.54 (14)	0.59 (15)	0.55 (14)	2.68 (68)	3.43 (87)	2.36 (60)	1.39 (35)	1.08 (27)	1.11 (28)	16.92 (430)
Average snowfall inches (cm)	2.3 (5.8)	1.2 (3.0)	0.4 (1.0)	0.4 (1.0)	0.0 (0.0)	0.0 (0.0)	0.0 (0.0)	0.0 (0.0)	0.0 (0.0)	0.0 (0.0)	0.5 (1.3)	1.8 (4.6)	6.6 (16.7)
Average precipitation days (≥ 0.01 in)	4.5	3.9	4.1	3.0	3.1	4.1	11.7	12.1	7.0	4.8	3.5	3.7	65.5
Average snowy days (≥ 0.1 in)	0.8	0.4	0.4	0.2	0.0	0.0	0.0	0.0	0.0	0.0	0.2	0.8	2.8
Source 1: NOAA (precip days, snow/snow days 1981–2010)
Source 2: National Weather Service

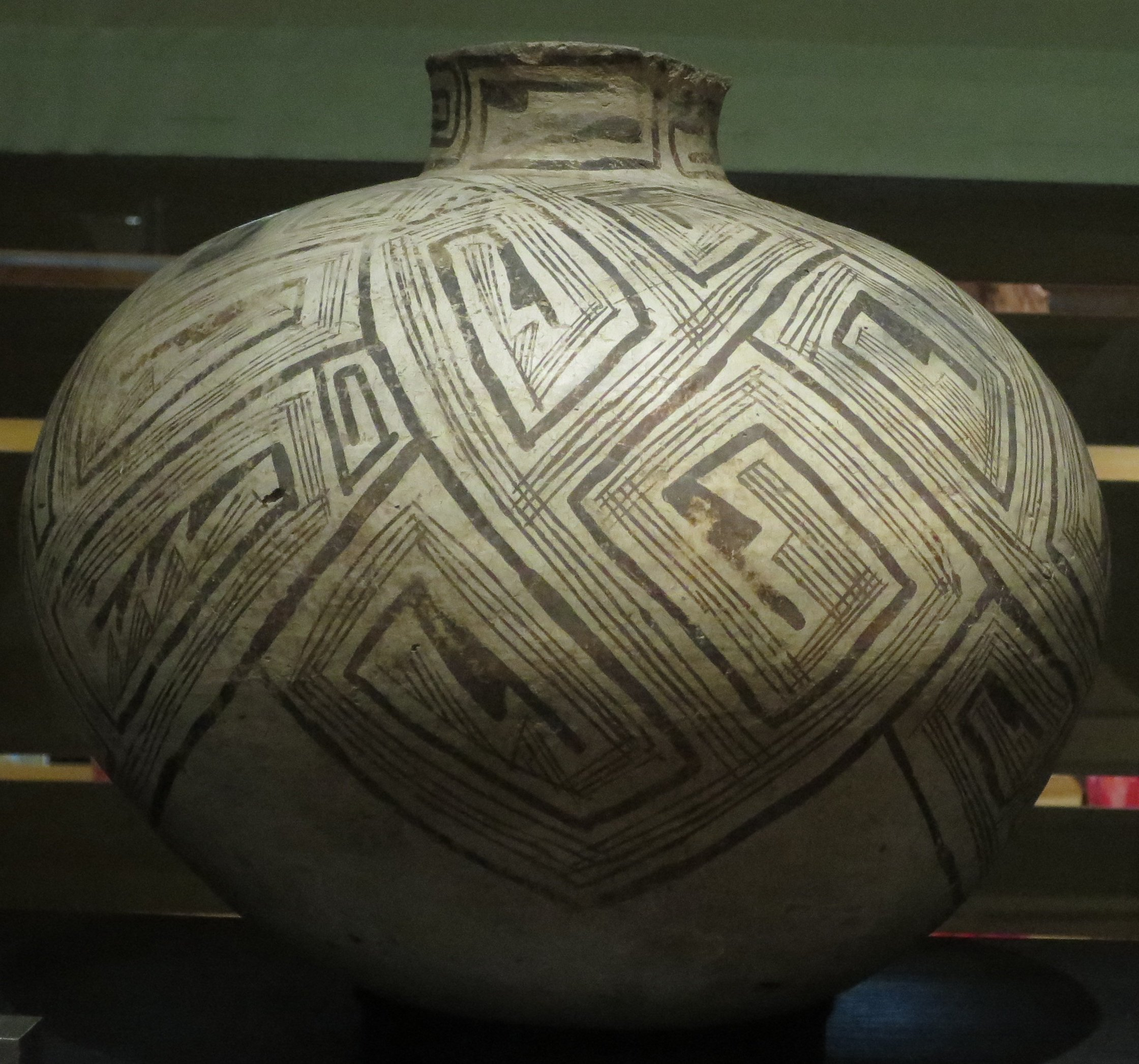
Reserve black on white olla, 1050-1100 CE, Heard Museum.

== Education ==
The city is served by the Reserve Independent School District.

== Reserve prehistoric pottery ==
This Ancestral Pueblo pottery type was named for the Reserve area, where it was first found, and is a major subdivision of the Cibola Whiteware group. Common designs are opposed solid and hatched motifs that are interlocked with each other. Usually the hatching is diagonal, but parallel hatching in late examples occurs as well. Squiggle hatching may occur on some early examples. Usually the hatched motifs average two to four times as wide as the solid motifs but occasionally approach the same size. Framing and hatching lines are usually the same width. "Bulls eyes" are common in Reserve Black-on-White.
