= Glenwood, New Mexico =

- Census-designated place
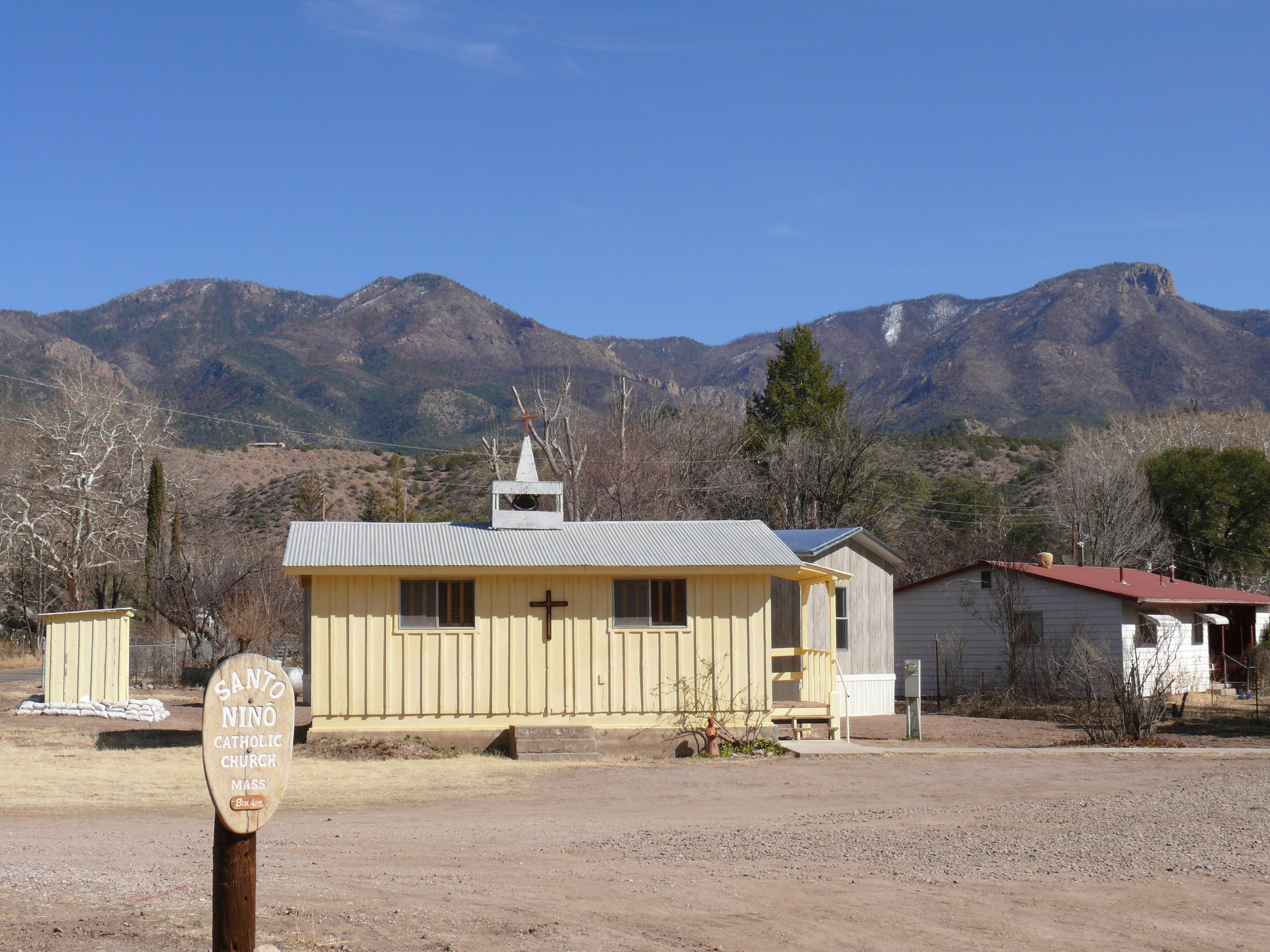
- Santo Niño church

- Location within the state of New Mexico
- Coordinates: 33°18′12″N 108°52′34″W
- Country: United States
- State: New Mexico
- County: Catron

Area
  - Total: 1.55 sq mi (4.01 km^{2})
  - Land: 1.54 sq mi (3.99 km^{2})
  - Water: 0.0077 sq mi (0.02 km^{2})
- Elevation: 4,708 ft (1,435 m)

Population (2020)
  - Total: 113
  - Density: 73.3/sq mi (28.32/km^{2})
- Time zone: UTC-5 (Mountain (MST))
  - Summer (DST): MDT
- Area code: 575
- GNIS feature ID: 2584104

Glenwood is a census-designated place in Catron County, New Mexico, United States. As of the 2020 census, Glenwood had a population of 113. The area was founded in 1878 as Bush Ranch. Located near the San Francisco River, Glenwood is 61 miles (98 km) northwest of Silver City on U.S. Route 180, and is 38 miles (61 km) south of Reserve.

== History ==
The first house was built in Glenwood in 1878 on the Bush Ranch, later renamed White Water for the creek that runs through it. When it was a stage stop the town was called Glenwood Springs, and in 1901 the town was formally named Glenwood. New Mexico's first powered airplane flight happened in 1909 near Glenwood.

In the 1930s Glenwood was the site of several mild earthquakes.

=== The Catwalk ===
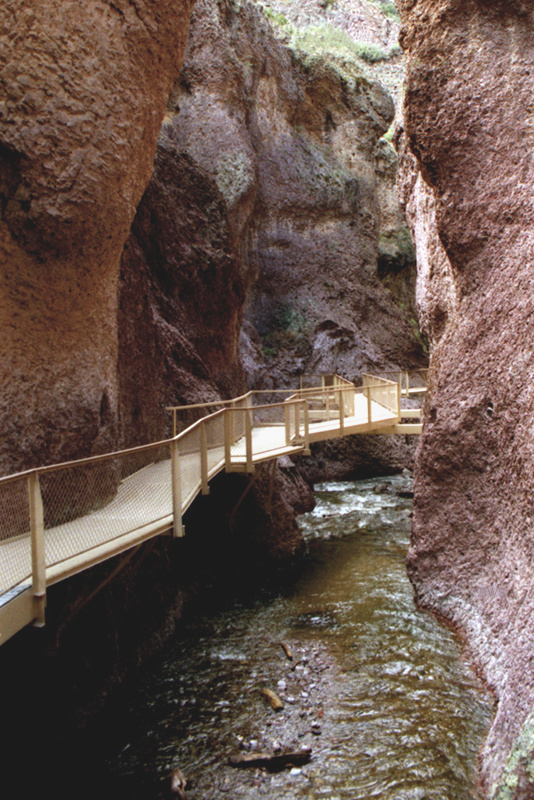
The catwalk

In 1889 silver and gold was discovered in the Mogollon Mountains above Whitewater Canyon, just east of Glenwood. Several mines were developed, and ore was hauled in wagons to a mill at the mouth of the canyon. The town of Graham was founded in the mountains, and water was needed to operate the electric generators. It came from a pipeline reaching up into the canyon, and was held onto the rock walls of the canyon with timbers and iron bars that were in constant need of maintenance. Workmen dubbed it the Catwalk, and today it is operated as part of the Glenwood Ranger District of the Gila National Forest. Today it is the site of the one-mile Catwalk National Recreation Trail, a universal access walking trail which follows the route of the old pipeline, clinging dramatically to the side of Whitewater Canyon often a dozen feet or more above Whitewater Creek.

== Present ==
Glenwood is home to the Gila National Forest Glenwood Ranger Station and the Glenwood State Trout Hatchery.

== Geography ==
=== Climate ===
Climate data for Glenwood, New Mexico (1991–2020 normals, extremes 1941–2025)
Month	Jan	Feb	Mar	Apr	May	Jun	Jul	Aug	Sep	Oct	Nov	Dec	Year
Record high °F (°C)	78 (26)	83 (28)	86 (30)	100 (38)	102 (39)	108 (42)	108 (42)	104 (40)	104 (40)	96 (36)	89 (32)	80 (27)	108 (42)
Mean daily maximum °F (°C)	57.4 (14.1)	60.9 (16.1)	67.3 (19.6)	74.2 (23.4)	82.1 (27.8)	91.2 (32.9)	91.0 (32.8)	88.8 (31.6)	84.8 (29.3)	76.4 (24.7)	65.4 (18.6)	56.8 (13.8)	74.7 (23.7)
Daily mean °F (°C)	40.3 (4.6)	43.2 (6.2)	48.4 (9.1)	54.1 (12.3)	61.5 (16.4)	70.7 (21.5)	74.6 (23.7)	73.1 (22.8)	67.5 (19.7)	57.6 (14.2)	47.0 (8.3)	40.0 (4.4)	56.5 (13.6)
Mean daily minimum °F (°C)	23.2 (−4.9)	25.6 (−3.6)	29.6 (−1.3)	34.1 (1.2)	40.9 (4.9)	50.1 (10.1)	58.1 (14.5)	57.5 (14.2)	50.2 (10.1)	38.8 (3.8)	28.6 (−1.9)	23.2 (−4.9)	38.3 (3.5)
Record low °F (°C)	−4 (−20)	−2 (−19)	11 (−12)	20 (−7)	22 (−6)	35 (2)	43 (6)	43 (6)	33 (1)	17 (−8)	6 (−14)	−3 (−19)	−4 (−20)
Average precipitation inches (mm)	1.37 (35)	1.25 (32)	0.88 (22)	0.35 (8.9)	0.66 (17)	0.57 (14)	2.99 (76)	2.83 (72)	1.99 (51)	1.26 (32)	1.07 (27)	1.42 (36)	16.64 (422.9)
Average snowfall inches (cm)	0.9 (2.3)	0.4 (1.0)	0.2 (0.51)	0.0 (0.0)	0.0 (0.0)	0.0 (0.0)	0.0 (0.0)	0.0 (0.0)	0.0 (0.0)	0.0 (0.0)	0.1 (0.25)	0.2 (0.51)	1.8 (4.57)
Average precipitation days (≥ 0.01 in)	4.1	3.9	3.5	1.9	1.8	2.3	11.0	10.4	5.8	2.7	2.8	4.5	54.7
Average snowy days (≥ 0.1 in)	0.4	0.3	0.3	0.0	0.0	0.0	0.0	0.0	0.0	0.0	0.1	0.5	1.6
Source 1: NOAA
Source 2: xmACIS2

== Education ==
It is in the Reserve Independent School District.

The community is served by the Glenwood Public Library.

== Demographics ==
Historical population
Census	Pop.	Note	%±
2020	113		—
U.S. Decennial Census

== See also ==
- List of census-designated places in New Mexico
