= Mogollon Mountains =

Mountain range in New Mexico, US

Coordinates: 33.32336°N 108.64174°W

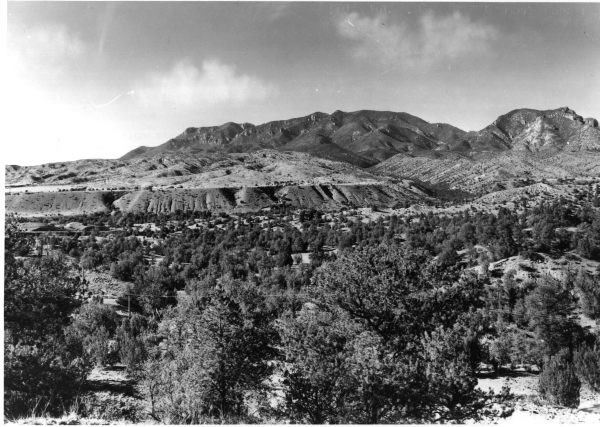
View of the Mogollon Range from U.S. Route 180

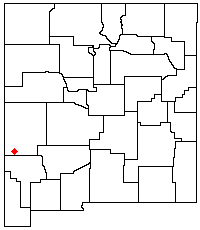
Location of the Mogollon Mountains in western New Mexico

The Mogollon Mountains or Mogollon Range (/mʌɡɪˈjoʊn/ or /moʊɡəˈjoʊn/) are a mountain range in Grant County and Catron County of southwestern New Mexico, in the Southwestern United States. They are primarily protected within the Gila National Forest.

== Geography ==
The Mogollon Mountains are located west of the Gila River and east of the San Francisco River, between the communities of Reserve and Silver City. They extend roughly north–south for about 30 mi (50 km), and form part of the divide between the San Francisco and Gila Rivers. The crest of the range lies about 15 mi (24 km) east of U.S. Route 180, which traverses parallel to a section of the San Francisco River. The Sierra Aguilada, a lower altitude smaller range, borders to the west of Route 180. Most of the Mogollon Mountains range is protected within the Gila Wilderness, in the Gila National Forest.

The highest point in the range is Whitewater Baldy which, at 10,895 ft (3,321 m), is the highest point in southwestern New Mexico. The range also contains five other peaks over 10,000 feet, most notably Mogollon Baldy 10,778 ft (3,285 m).

== Geology ==
The Mogollon Mountains were formed between forty and twenty-five million years ago as part of the Datil-Mogollon Volcanic Plateau. Hot springs existing in the area are a remnant of that volcanic activity.

== History ==
The Mogollon Mountains are named for Juan Ignacio Flores Mogollón, governor of Spanish colonial Nuevo Leon from 1712 to 1715, in the Viceroyalty of New Spain.

Early inhabitants of the range include the Mimbres Culture, from 300 BCE to 1300 CE. Later peoples included the Chiricahua and Mimbres bands of the Apache. Geronimo is said to have been born in the area around 1829.

Mining occurred in the area beginning in the 1890s and continuing for some decades when the natural grizzly bear population was destroyed.

The Mogollon Mountains should not be confused with the Mogollon Rim, a large escarpment in Arizona, about 100 miles (160 km) to the northwest.
