= Withington Wilderness =

Wilderness area in New Mexico, US

- IUCN category Ib (wilderness area)
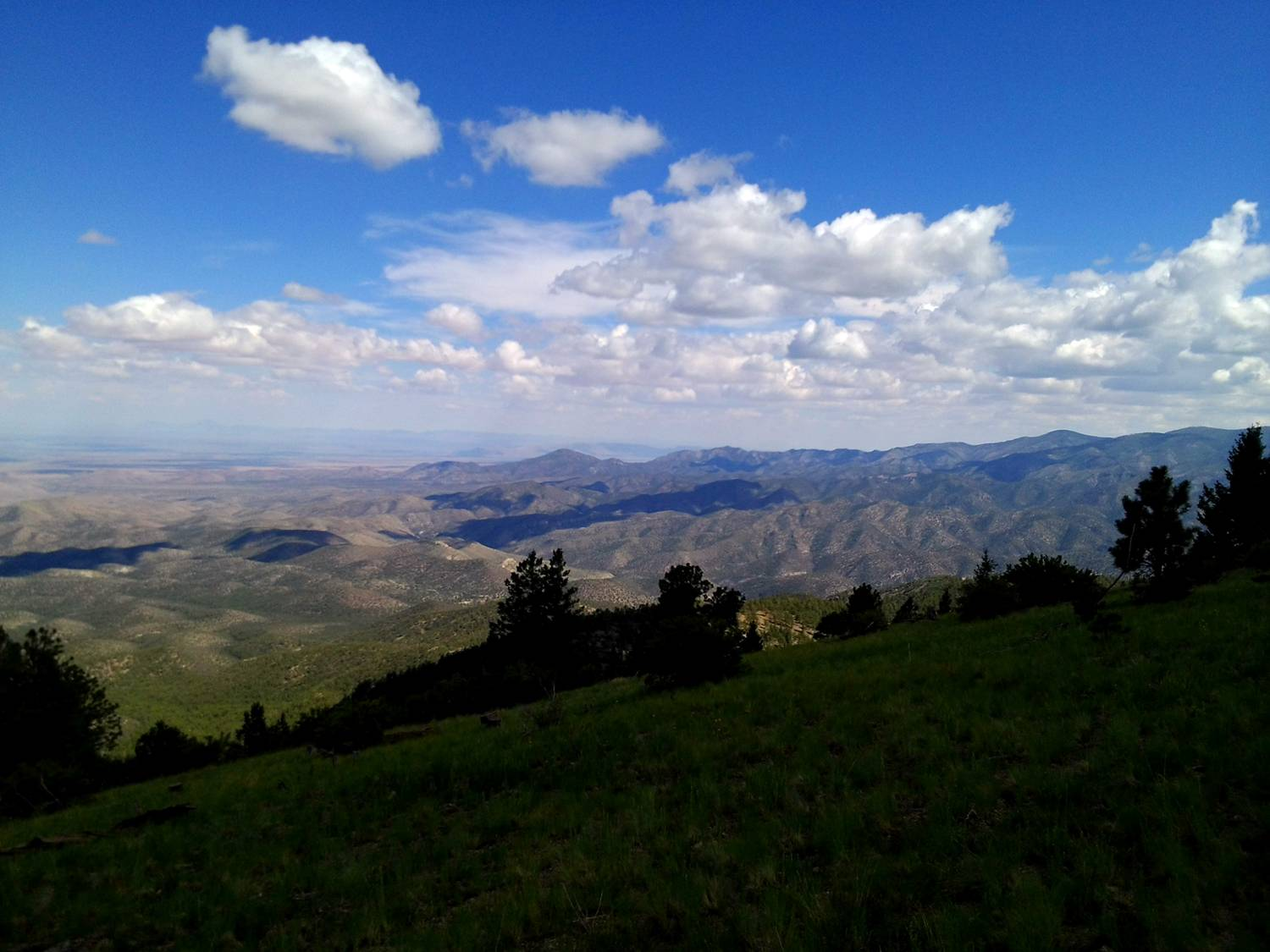
- The view of the San Mateo Mountains, southeast of the Withington Wilderness Area

- Location within New Mexico
- Location: New Mexico, United States
- Nearest city: Magdalena, New Mexico
- Coordinates: 33.896°N 107.459°W
- Governing body: U.S. Forest Service, Cibola National Forest
- Website: www.fs.usda.gov/cibola/

The Withington Wilderness is a 19,000-acre designated Wilderness area located within the Cibola National Forest in western New Mexico. Located in the Magdalena Ranger District, approximately 20 miles southwest of Magdalena, New Mexico, the wilderness area lies around 10,100 ft. Mount Withington, on the eastern slope of the San Mateo Mountains in Socorro County, New Mexico, United States.

== History and administration ==
The Withington Wilderness Area was designated in December 1980 as part of Public Law 96-550, which placed numerous areas in New Mexico’s National Forests in the National Wilderness Preservation System. Also known as the New Mexico Wilderness Act, the law created two Wilderness Areas in the Cibola National Forest’s Magdalena Ranger District, setting aside 19,000 acres in the District’s northeastern corner as the Withington Wilderness, and 44,678 acres in the District’s southern half as the Apache Kid Wilderness. Both Wilderness Areas are administered by the Cibola National Forest, headquartered in Albuquerque, and are managed as part of the Magdalena Ranger District, located in Magdalena.

== Geography and climate ==
The topography in the northern San Mateo Mountains is gentler than that in the south, but still features deep canyons, high ridgelines and generally dry conditions. Winters are cold enough to bring snow, and during July and August, the desert "monsoon" season, rainwater may flood narrow canyons.

== Flora ==
Vegetation within the Wilderness Area ranges from mixed conifers, such as pine, spruce, fir, in the higher elevations, to pinion and juniper in the more open ground east of the mountains, to stands of ocotillo along the western banks of the Rio Grande.

== Fauna ==
Habitats in the Withington Wilderness support populations of mountain lion, black bear, elk, mule deer, coyote, turkey and quail. A portion of the Wilderness is critical habitat for the threatened Mexican spotted owl. The greater San Mateo Mountains were identified as a key conservation area by The Nature Conservancy due to their ecological diversity and species richness.

Wildlife in the Withington Wilderness Area
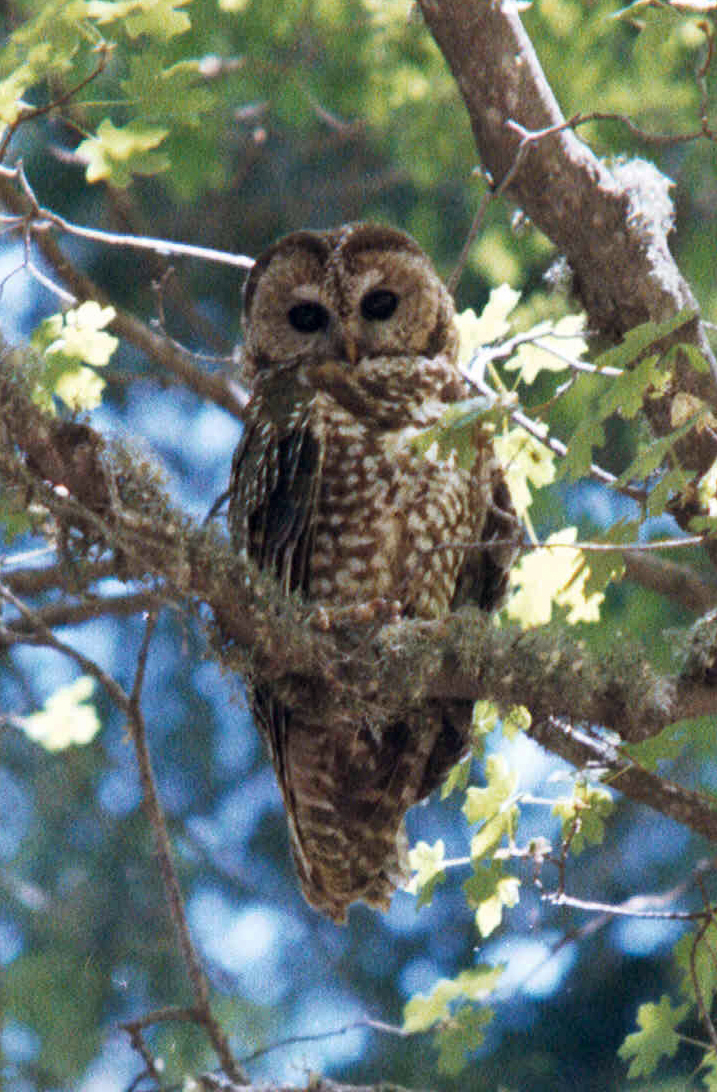
The Withington Wilderness contains critical habitat for the threatened Mexican spotted owl.

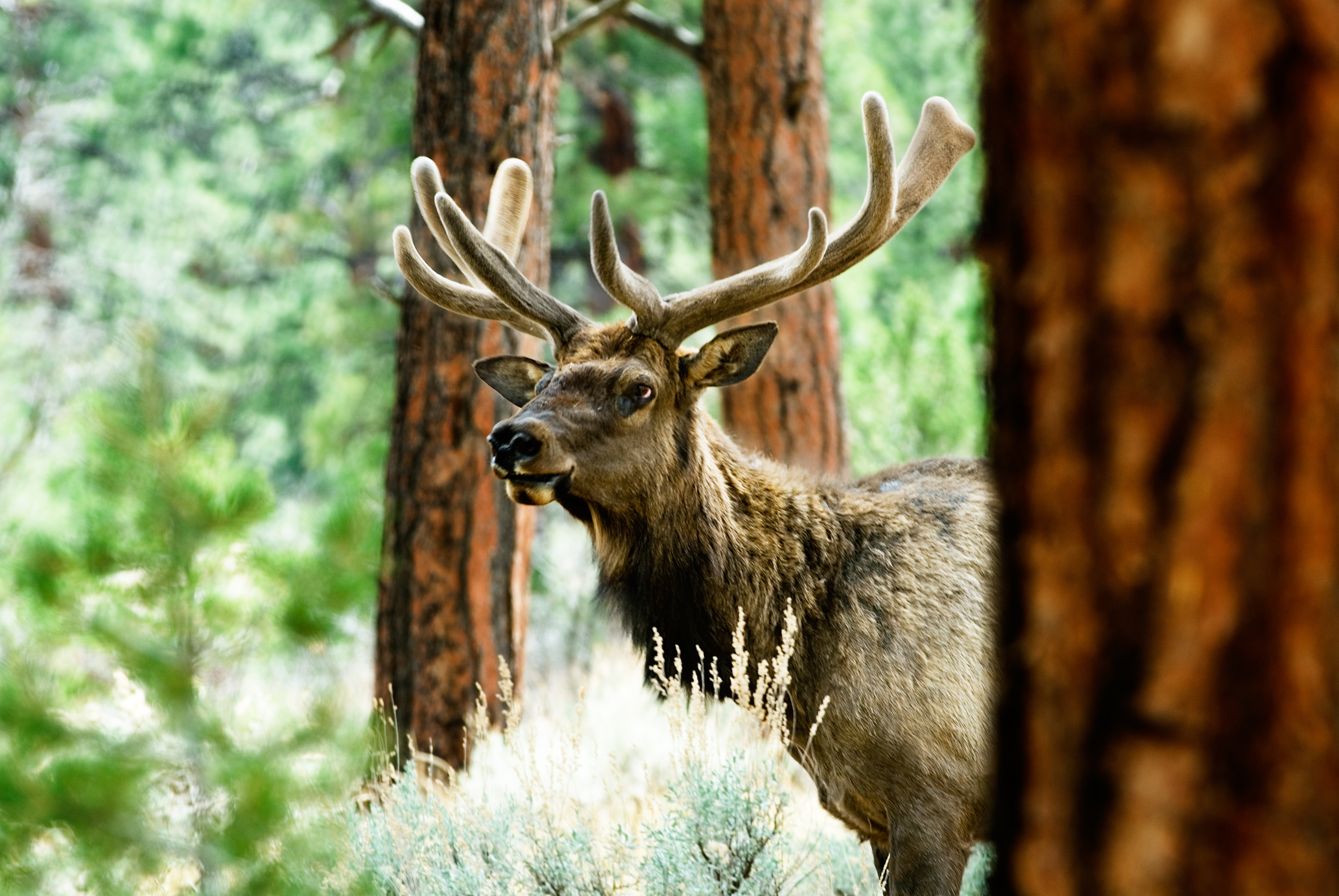
The Withington Wilderness is home to healthy populations of elk.

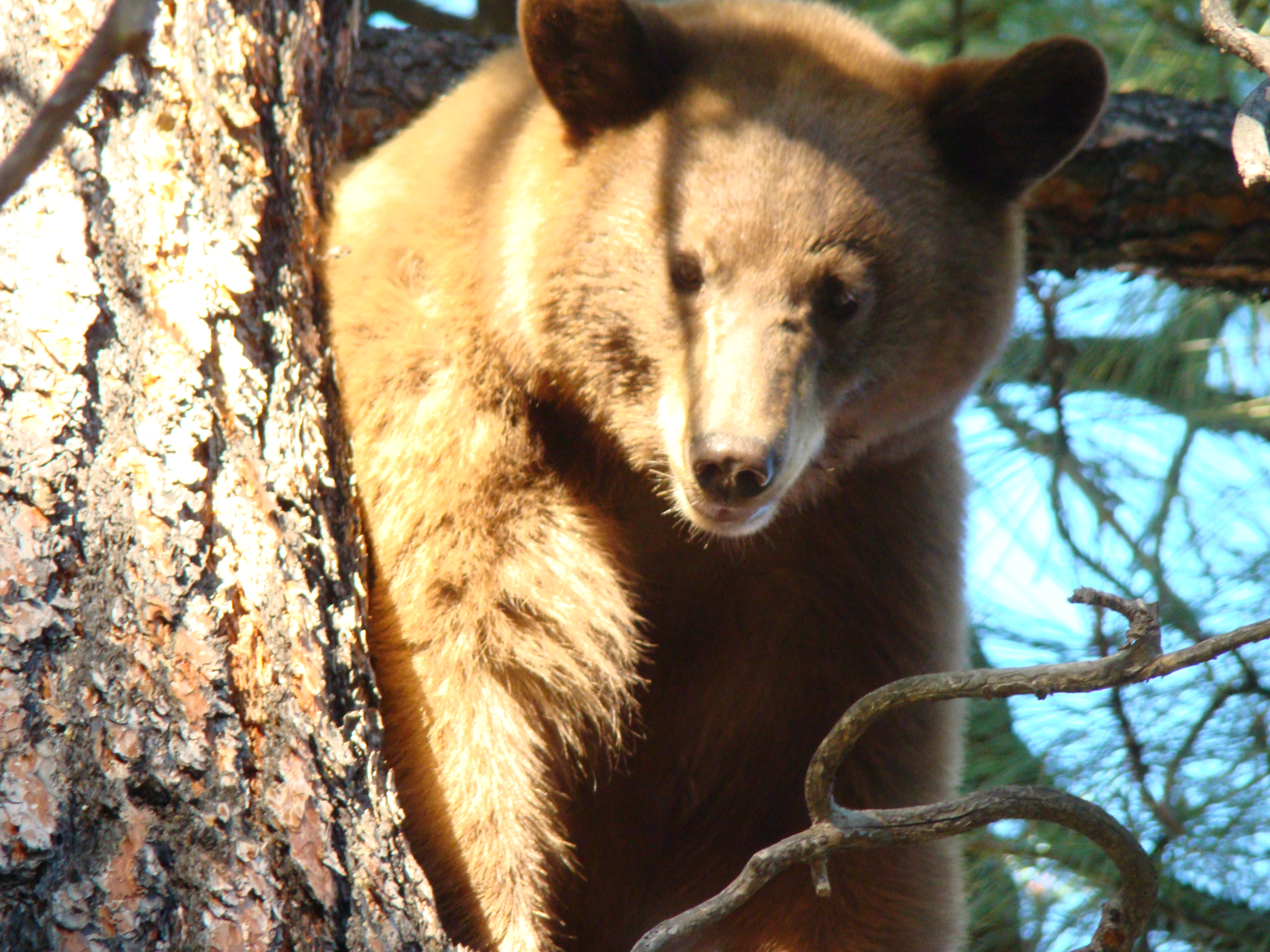
A black bear in Cibola National Forest

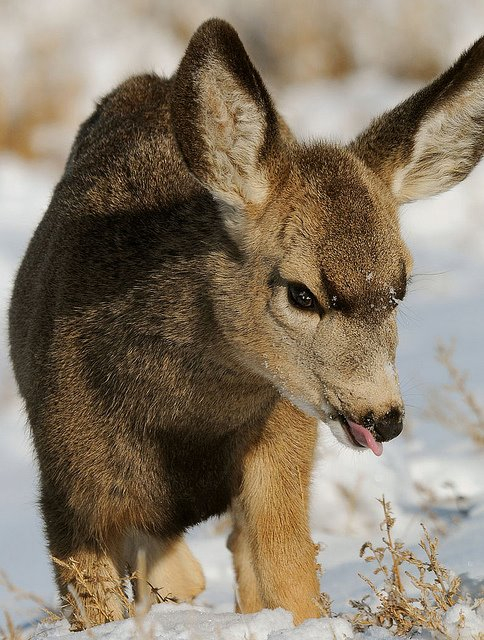
A mule deer fawn in the snow

== Location and access ==
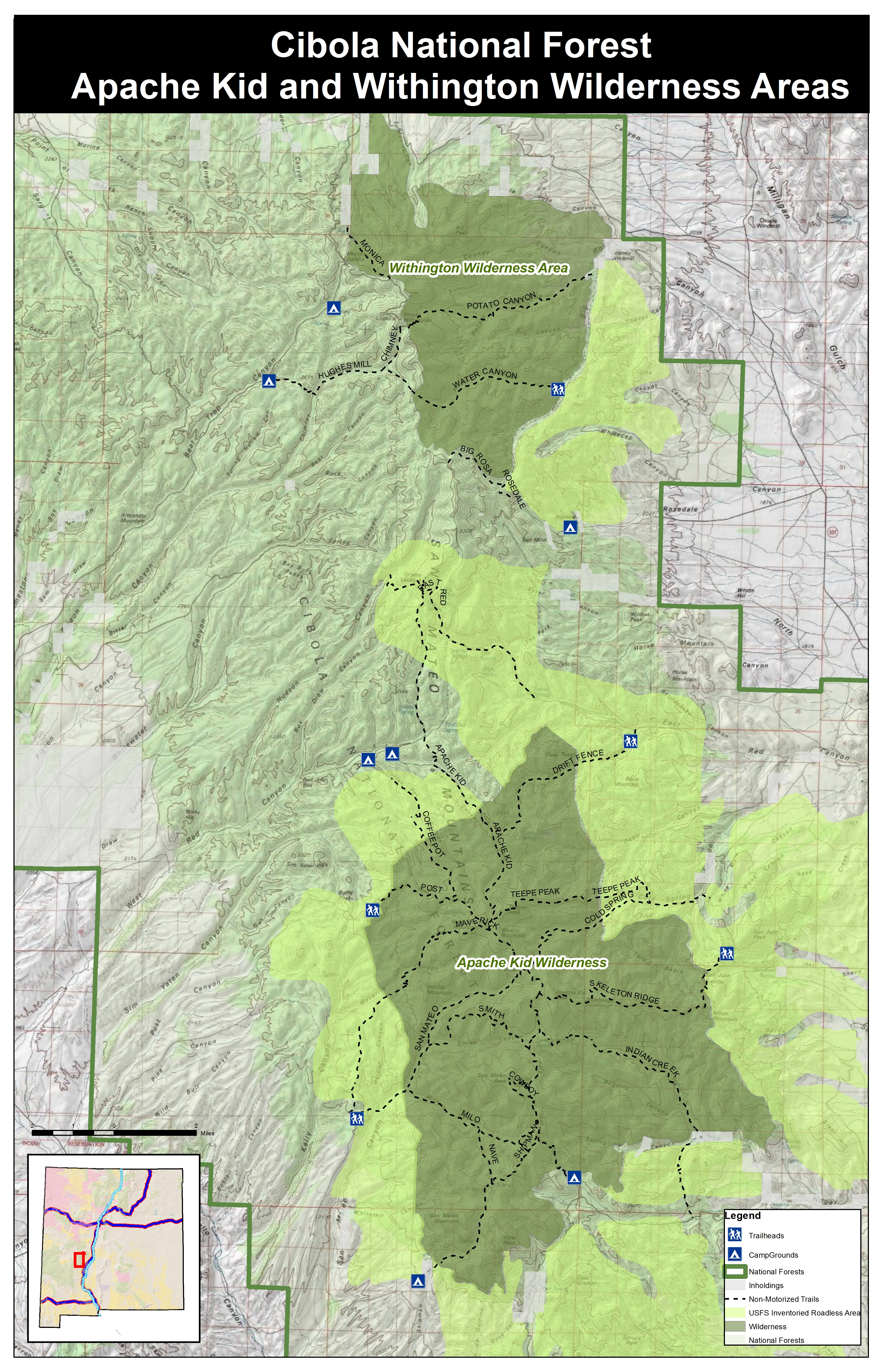
A map of the San Mateo Mountains showing the Apache Kid and Withington Wilderness Areas

In common with all designated Wilderness Areas, the Withington Wilderness is undeveloped and is closed to all forms of mechanized transport. A little visited area, particularly in comparison to the nearby Apache Kid Wilderness, the Wilderness can be accessed for hiking and Leave-No-Trace primitive camping via two trail-heads on the eastern border of the Wilderness. These trail-heads offer access to a pair of trails that traverse the area east-to-west, the 4.4 mile Trail 437, The Water Canyon Trail and the 6.2 mile Trail 438, The Potato Canyon Trail. Both trail-heads can be reached from Magdalena by traveling south on NM 107 for approximately 18 miles, before turning west onto Forest Road 52 and going three miles before turning south onto Forest Road 56. The trail-head for the Potato Canyon Trail is 2.5 miles from the junction with Forest Road 52 and the Water Canyon Trail trail-head is 6.5 miles, near the gated end of Forest Road 56.

== Nearby attractions ==
The 8,039-acre White Cap Inventoried Roadless Area is directly adjacent to the Withington Wilderness. The Apache Kid Wilderness, also in the San Mateo Mountains, lies due south of the Withington Wilderness. To the north of the Withington Wilderness and San Mateo Mountains is the Very Large Array radio telescope observatory.

== See also ==
- Cibola National Forest
- List of U.S. Wilderness Areas
