= West Blue Mountain =

Mountain in New Mexico, United States

- Location within New Mexico

Highest point
- Elevation: 10,340 ft (3,150 m) NAVD 88
- Prominence: 3,136 ft (956 m)
- Coordinates: 33°39′54″N 107°26′45″W

Geography
- Location: Socorro County, New Mexico, U.S.
- Parent range: San Mateo Mountains
- Topo map: USGS Blue Mountain

Climbing
- Easiest route: Difficult trail hike

West Blue Mountain is the highest peak in the San Mateo Mountains of southwestern New Mexico, in the United States. It rises in the southern half of the range, far from any paved road, making access difficult and traffic on the surrounding trails very light. Its summit is the highest point in the Apache Kid Wilderness of the Cibola National Forest.
