= Cibola National Forest =

United States National Forest in New Mexico

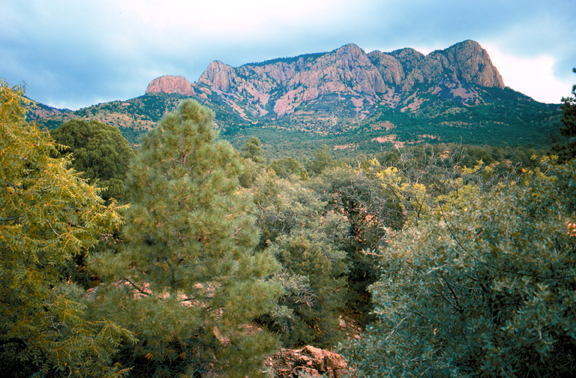
- The Apache Kid Wilderness in the Cibola National Forest. Photo: US Forest Service.
- Location: New Mexico, United States
- Nearest city: Albuquerque, New Mexico
- Coordinates: 34.297°N 107.413°W
- Area: 1,633,783 acres (6,611.69 km^{2})
- Established: December 3, 1931
- Governing body: U.S. Forest Service
- Website: Cibola National Forest

The Cibola National Forest (pronounced SEE-bo-lah) is a 1,633,783 acre (6,611.7 km2) United States National Forest in New Mexico, US. The name Cibola is thought to be the original Zuni Indian name for their pueblos or tribal lands. The name was later interpreted by the Spanish to mean "buffalo". The forest is disjointed with lands spread across central and northern New Mexico, west Texas and Oklahoma. The Cibola National Forest is divided into four Ranger Districts: the Sandia, Mountainair, Mt. Taylor, and Magdalena. The Forest includes the San Mateo, Magdalena, Datil, Bear, Gallina, Manzano, Sandia, Mt. Taylor, and Zuni Mountains of west-central New Mexico. The Forest also manages four National Grasslands that stretch from northeastern New Mexico eastward into the Texas Panhandle and western Oklahoma. The Cibola National Forest and Grassland is administered by Region 3 of the United States Forest Service from offices in Albuquerque, New Mexico. Elevation ranges from 5,000 ft (1,500 m) to 11,301 ft (3,445 m). (The preceding figures do not include any of the four National Grasslands mentioned below, which are detailed in their individual articles.) The descending order of Cibola National Forest acres (not counting the three Grassland areas) by county are: Socorro, Cibola, McKinley, Catron, Torrance, Bernalillo, Sandoval County, New Mexico, Lincoln, Sierra, and Valencia counties in New Mexico. The Cibola National Forest currently has 137,701 acres designated as Wilderness. In addition to these acres, it has 246,000 acres classified as Inventoried Roadless Areas pursuant to the Roadless Area Conservation Rule.

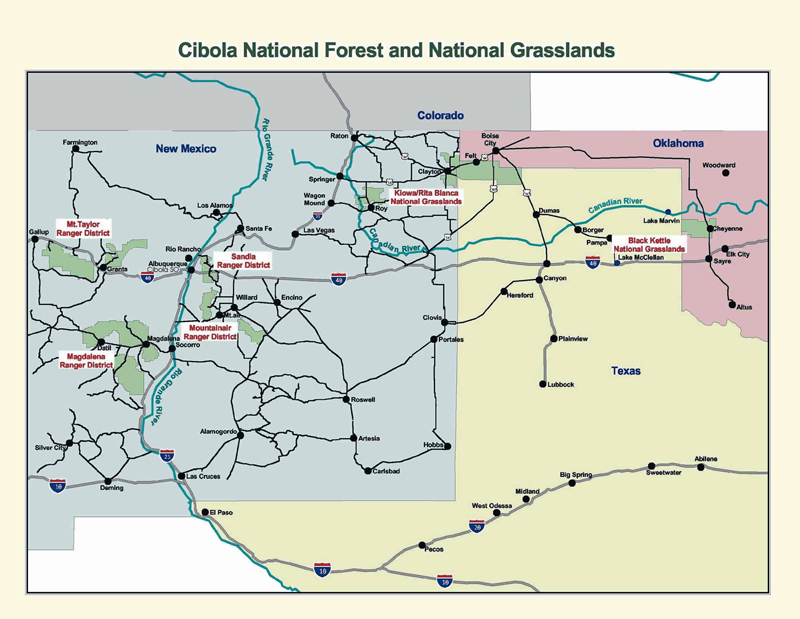
Map of Cibola National Forest

The Cibola National Forest is organized into several divisions over three states. The Rita Blanca National Grassland 92,989 acres (376.3 km^{2}) in Dallam County, Texas, and Cimarron County, Oklahoma, Black Kettle National Grassland 31,286 acres (126.6 km^{2}) in Roger Mills County, Oklahoma, and Hemphill County, Texas, and McClellan Creek National Grassland 1,449 acres (5.9 km^{2}) in Gray County, Texas, are in the Oklahoma–Texas panhandle region. The combined Cibola National Grasslands are 262,141 acres (1,060.8 km2) in size.

New Mexico is home to much of the Forest, including the Kiowa National Grassland 136,417 acres (552.1 km^{2}) in Harding, Union, Mora, and Colfax counties, New Mexico. The Cibola National Forest's Sandia Ranger District is just east of Albuquerque in Central New Mexico and includes the most visited mountains in the state of New Mexico. The Sandia District includes national forest land in eastern Bernalillo and southeastern Sandoval counties, and includes the Sandia Peak Tram and the Sandia Crest National Scenic Byway. The Sandia Mountains lie in the northern portion of the District. It is here where Congress designated the Sandia Mountain Wilderness (37,200 acres) in 1978. The Cibola's Sandia Ranger District also includes the Manzanita Mountains, which stretch south, between the Sandia and the Manzano Mountains. The Manzano Mountains are managed by the Cibola National Forest's Mountainair Ranger District.

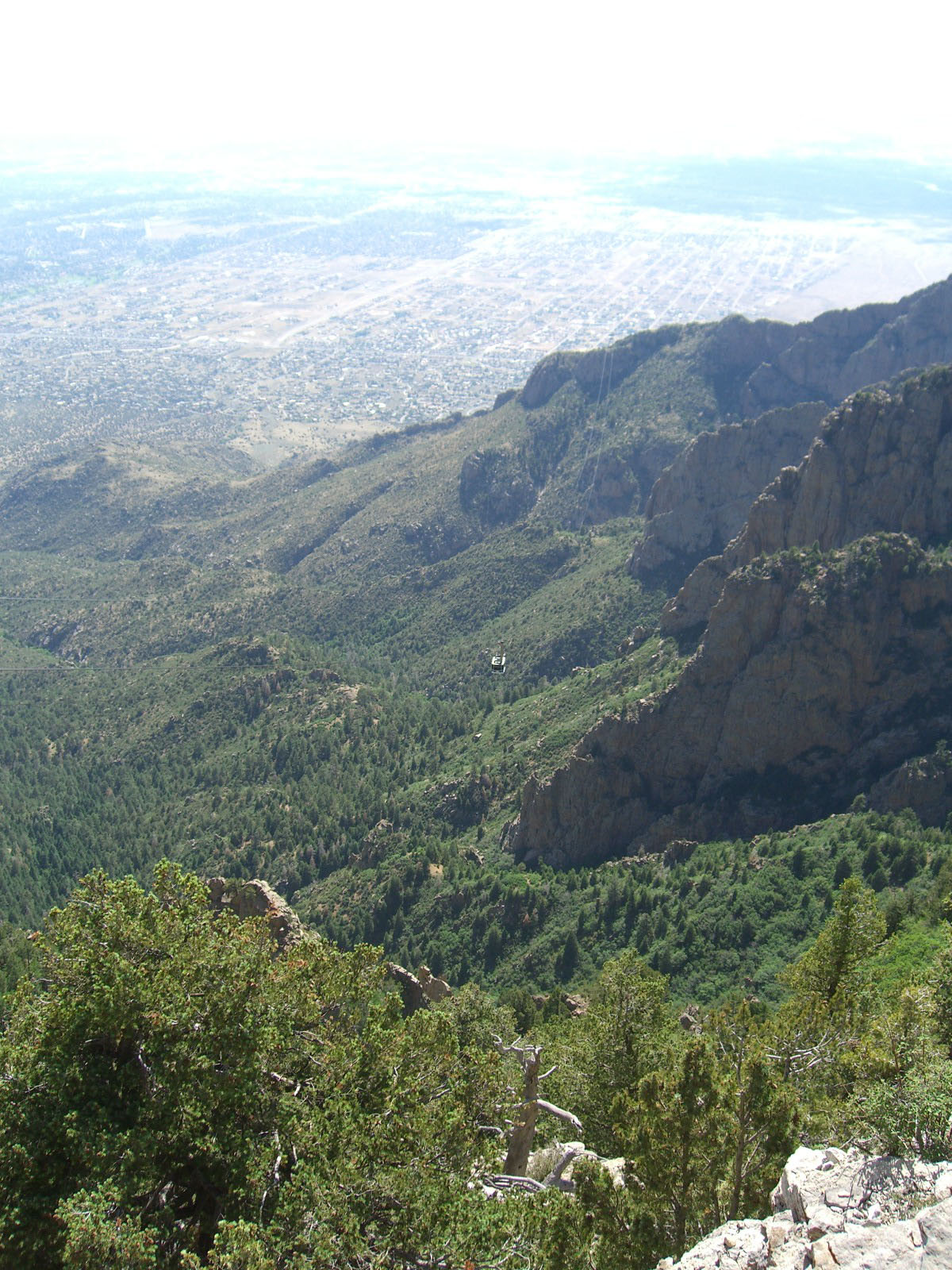
View from Sandia Peak, in the Sandia Mountains. In the background is Albuquerque, New Mexico. In the center is a tramway car moving along the Sandia Peak Tramway.

The Mountainair Ranger District manages national forestland in Torrance, northwestern Lincoln, and eastern Valencia counties, which are in central New Mexico. Within the Mountainair District are the Gallinas Mountains and the Manzano Mountains. Congress designated the Manzano Wilderness in 1978. The Mount Taylor Ranger District manages land in northern Cibola, southern McKinley, and western Sandoval counties in western New Mexico. Mount Taylor and Zuni Mountains are within the Mount Taylor District.

Overseeing approximately 800,000 acres, the Magdalena Ranger District is the largest of the Cibola National Forest's four mountain districts. The Cibola’s Magdalena District manages land in south central New Mexico in western Socorro, northeastern Catron, and northern Sierra counties. The Bear Mountains, Datil Mountains, Magdalena Mountains and San Mateo Mountains are all within the Magdalena District. There are two Wilderness areas in this District – the Apache Kid (44,626 acres) and the Withington (19,000 acres) Wilderness areas, both of which are in the San Mateo Mountains. In addition to the designated Wilderness, the Magdalena Ranger District has 205,972 acres of Inventoried Roadless Areas. The Magdalena Ranger District's officers are stationed in the Village of Magdalena. The District has roots in the Gila Forest Reserve, created by President William McKinley in 1899, making the U.S. Forest Service the “oldest continuous business in Magdalena.”

== Ecology ==
Cibola biomes range from Chihuahuan desert to short grass prairie to piñon-juniper to sub-alpine spruce and fir. The region also hosts wildlife as diverse as the biomes they inhabit.

Animals represented include:

- black bear
- cougar
- prairie dog
- mule deer
- pronghorn
- black rosy finch
- goshawk
- Mexican spotted owl
- wild turkey

Due to the Rio Grande, a large variety of migrating waterfowl and other birds follow the river's flyway during the spring and fall. Birds of prey are also present using the updrafts and thermals along the north-south alignment of the central mountains for their migration.

Wildlife in the Cibola National Forest

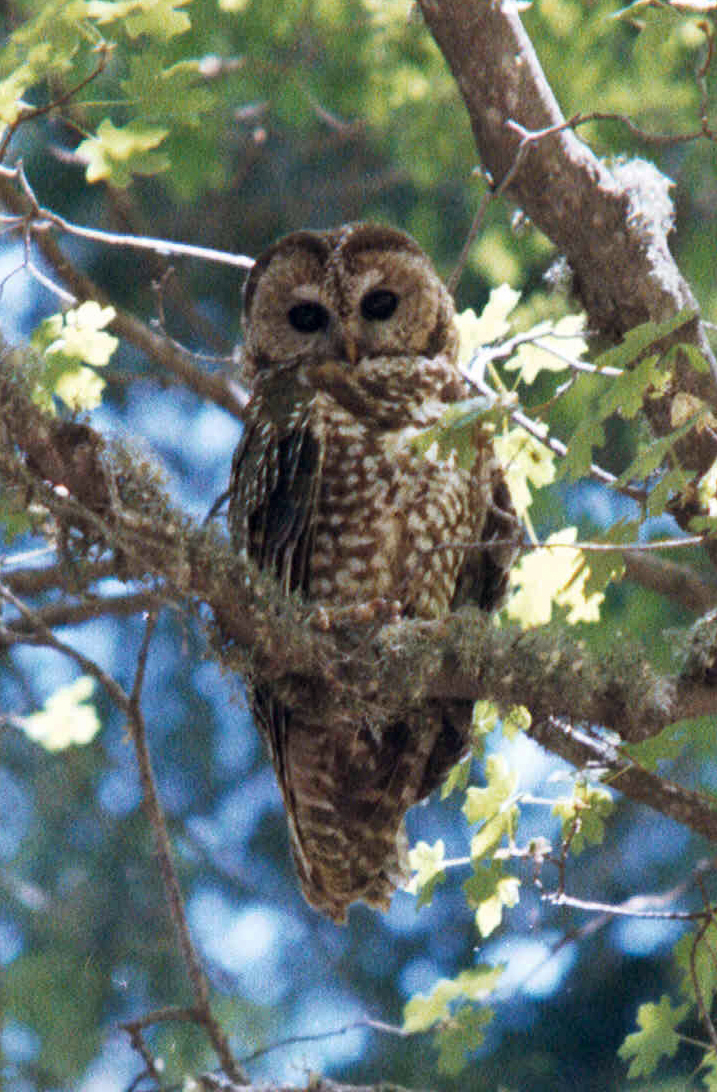
The Cibola National Forest contains thousands of acres of critical habitat for the threatened Mexican spotted owl.

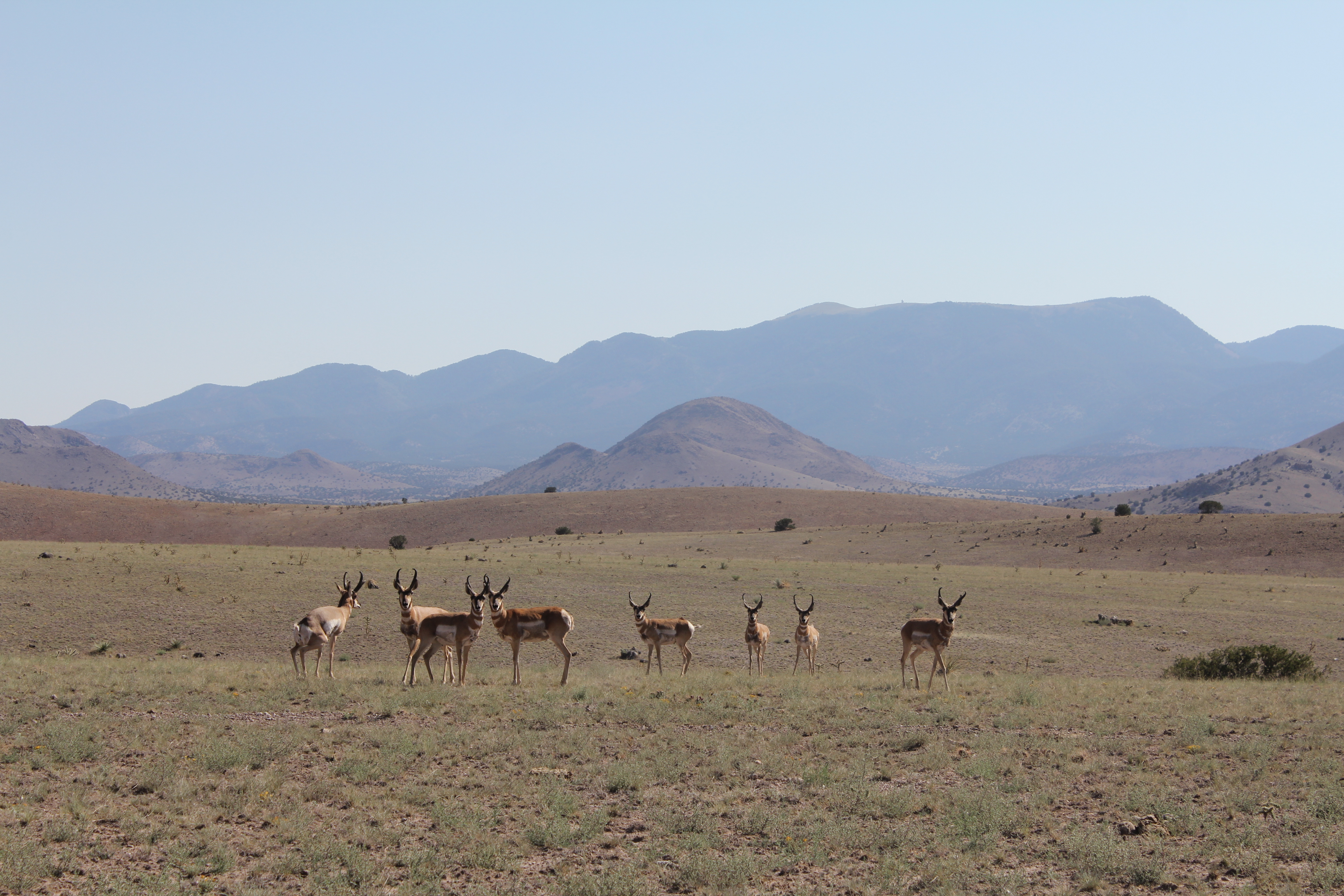
A pronghorn herd standing in front of the Magdalena Mountains. Photo courtesy of Josh Hicks.

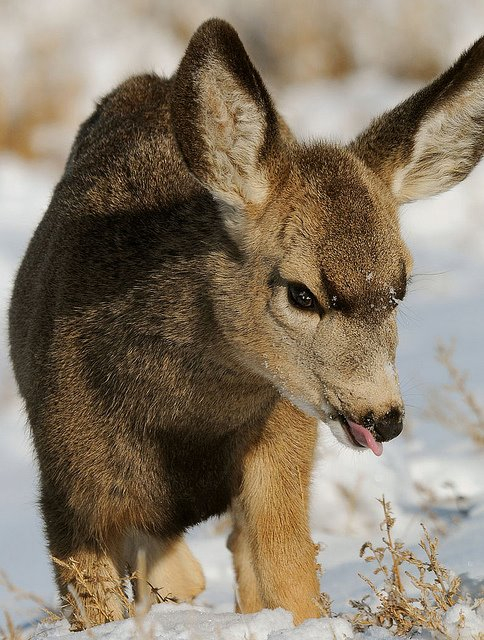
A mule deer fawn in the snow. Photo: US Forest Service.

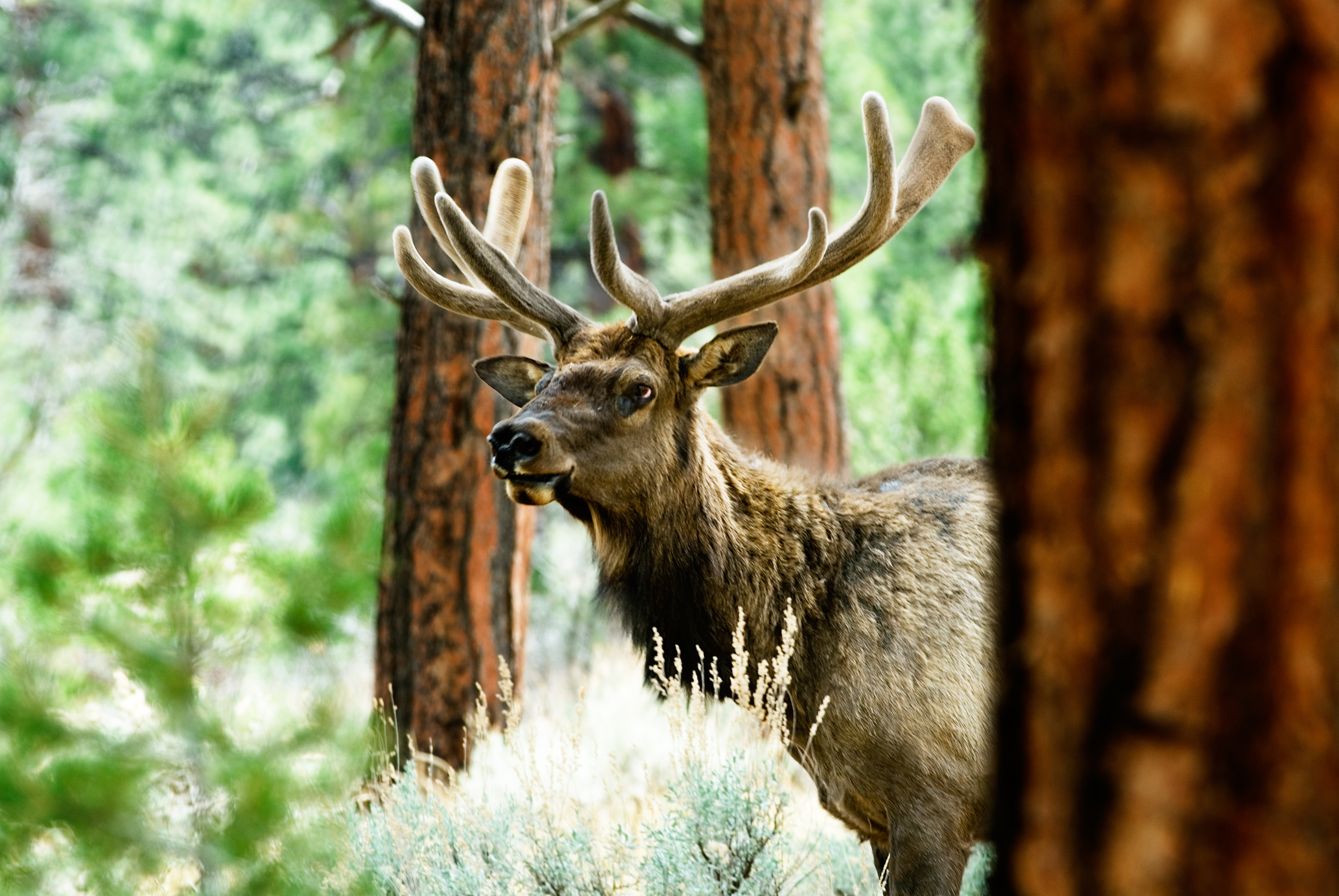
The Cibola National Forest is home to healthy herds of elk. Photo: US Forest Service.

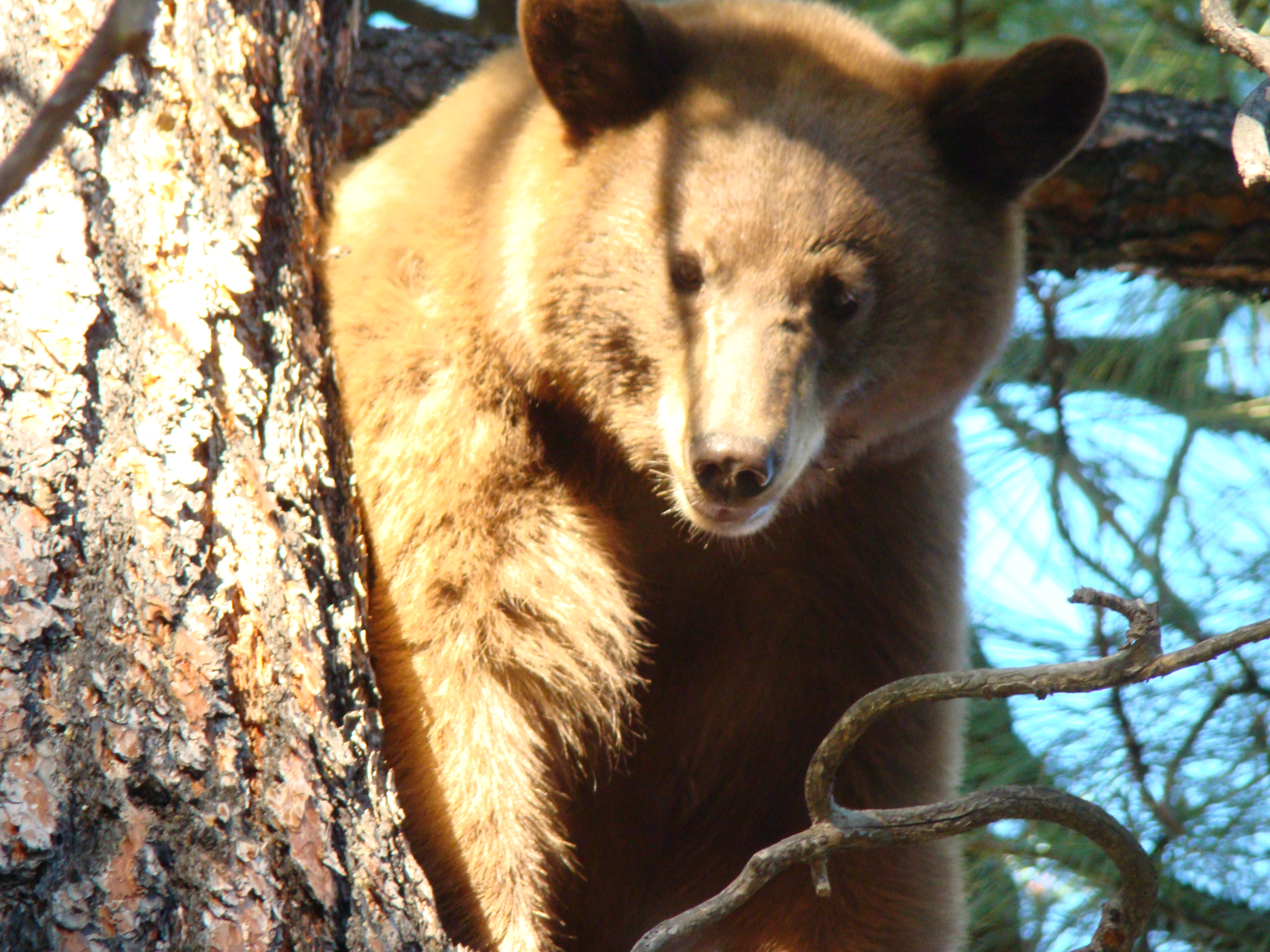
A cinnamon bear on Mount Taylor in Cibola National Forest. Photo: US Forest Service.

The ‘sky islands’ region of the Cibola hosts more than 200 rare plant and animal species, with more than 30 species listed as endangered or threatened by New Mexico or the federal government. The region is home to more bird and mammal species than any other ecoregion in the Southwest. The Rio Grande Watershed, which contains the Cibola’s four mountain ranger districts, ranked second out of eight watershed regions for species of greatest conservation need (SGCN) in the New Mexico Game and Fish’s Comprehensive Wildlife Conservation Strategy. The Comprehensive Wildlife Conservation Strategy also ranked the Arizona-New Mexico Mountain Ecoregion, within which the Magdalena and Mt. Taylor Ranger Districts are located, second out of six ecoregions in the state for SGCN, with 80 identified SGCN. The Nature Conservancy has identified the San Mateo, Magdalena, and Datil Mountains within the Cibola's Magdalena Ranger District as key conservation areas due to their ecological diversity.

== Recreation and special uses ==
The Cibola offers an abundance of recreational opportunities including picnicking, backpacking, camping, skiing, hiking, wildlife-viewing, star-gazing, horseback-riding, hunting and mountain biking as well as driving for pleasure and enjoying the aerial Sandia Peak Tramway with a restaurant and skiing at the top. The two most popular recreational activities on the Cibola are hiking/walking and viewing natural features with 35% and 15% of visitors citing these as their main activities, respectively.

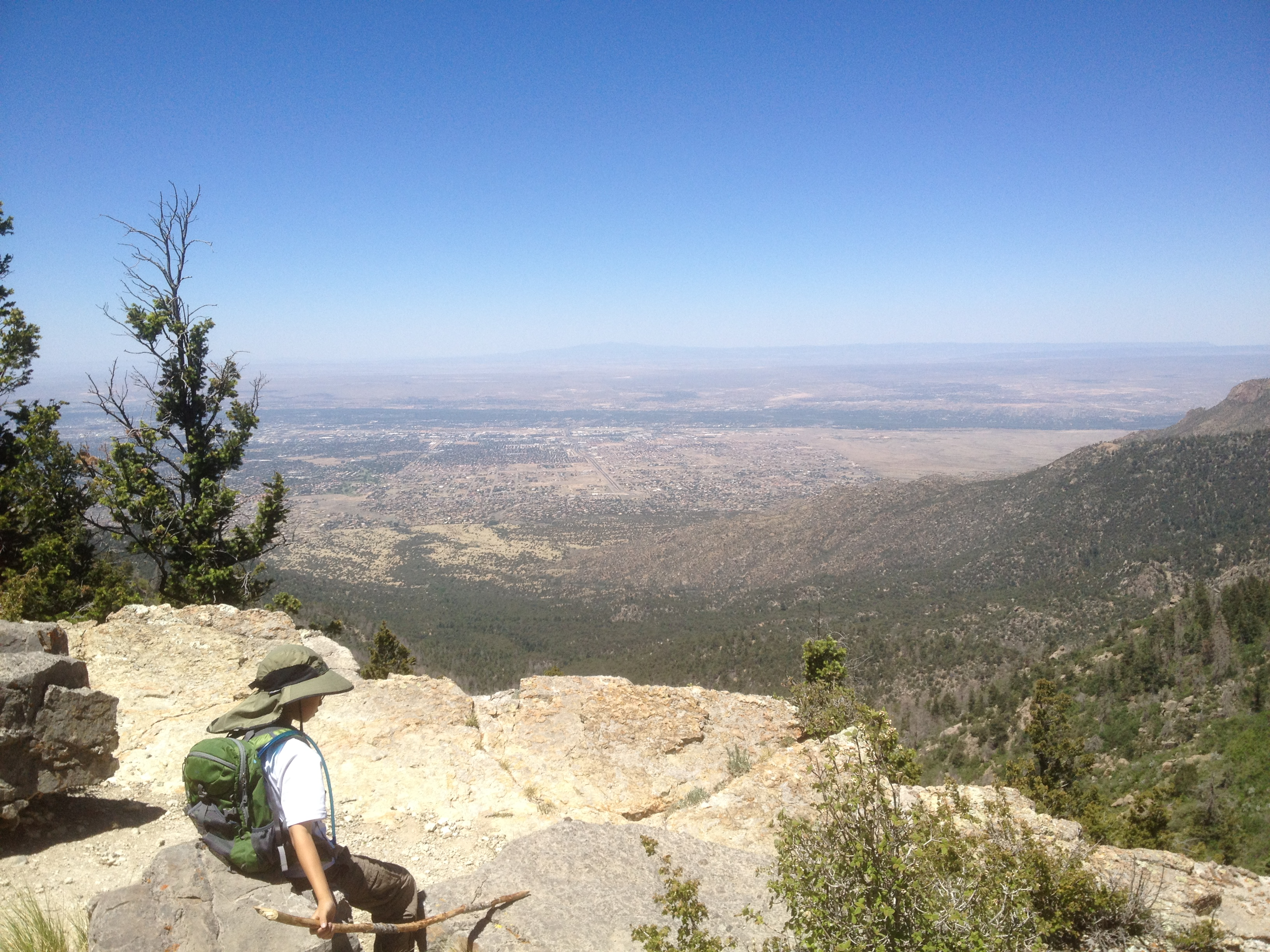
Resting and enjoying the view from the top of the Cienega Trail in the Sandia Mountains

In addition to ample recreational opportunities, the Cibola provides special facilities for scientific research. The largest special use permit on the Cibola is for the Langmuir Research Site, with 31,000-acres on South Baldy Peak. The Langmuir Laboratory for Atmospheric Research was established to study atmospheric processes that result in lightning, hail, and rain. The Magdalena Ridge Observatory (MRO), also located on South Baldy, studies astronomical events with a 2.4-m telescope and the Magdalena Ridge Observatory Interferometer. Both Langmuir and MRO are operated by the New Mexico Institute of Mining and Technology.

Additional multiple uses that occur on the Cibola National Forest include grazing, mining, logging, and oil/gas development.

== History ==
The lands in the Cibola National Forest have a rich cultural history. The forest itself grew out of lands first established as Forest Reserves in the late 1800s to protect natural resources, such as watersheds, trees, and soils. The human and cultural history of these national forest lands stretch back well before the 1800s. Basham noted in his report documenting the archeological history of the Cibola’s Magdalena Ranger District that “[t]he heritage resources on the district are diverse and representative of nearly every prominent human evolutionary event known to anthropology. Evidence for human use of district lands date back 14,000 years to the Paleoindian period providing glimpses into the peopling of the New World and megafaunal extinction.“

Historical Photos of the Cibola National Forest

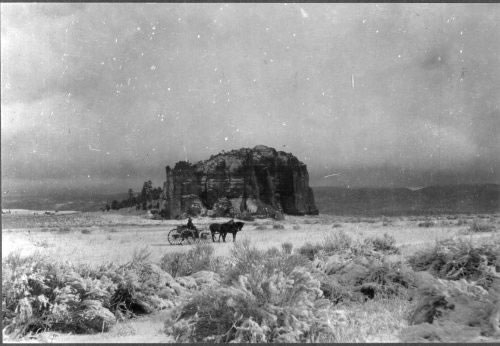
The Zuni Mountains of the Cibola National Forest in the winter of 1908. Photo: US Forest Service.

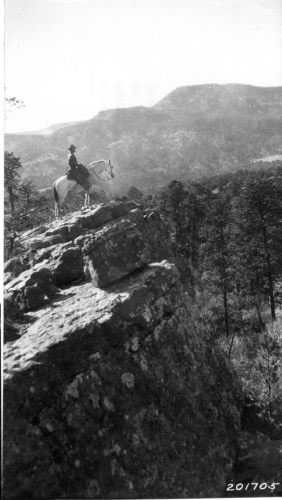
The Forest Supervisor near Mount Taylor in 1925. Photo: US Forest Service.

Much of the now Magdalena Ranger District were a province of the Apache. Bands of Apache effectively controlled the Magdalena-Datil region from the seventeenth century until they were defeated in the Apache Wars in the late nineteenth century. Outlaw renegades Butch Cassidy and the Wild Bunch and notable Apaches like Cochise and Geronimo have ties to the San Mateos. Vicks Peak was named after Victorio, “a Mimbreño Apache leader whose territory included much of the south and southwest New Mexico.” Famous for defying relocation orders in 1879 and leading his warriors “on a two-year reign of terror before he was killed,” Victorio is at least as highly regarded as Geronimo or Cochise among Apaches. Perhaps the most famous outlaw was the Apache Kid whose supposed grave lies within the Apache Kid Wilderness. Stories of depredations by the Apache Kid, and of his demise, became so common and dramatic that in southwestern folklore they may be exceeded only by tales of lost Spanish gold. Native Americans lingered in the San Mateos well into the 1900s. This is documented in a 1919 essay by Aldo Leopold in which he describes stumbling upon the remains of a recently abandoned Indian hunting camp.

Cultural or Historic Figures with Ties to the Cibola National Forest

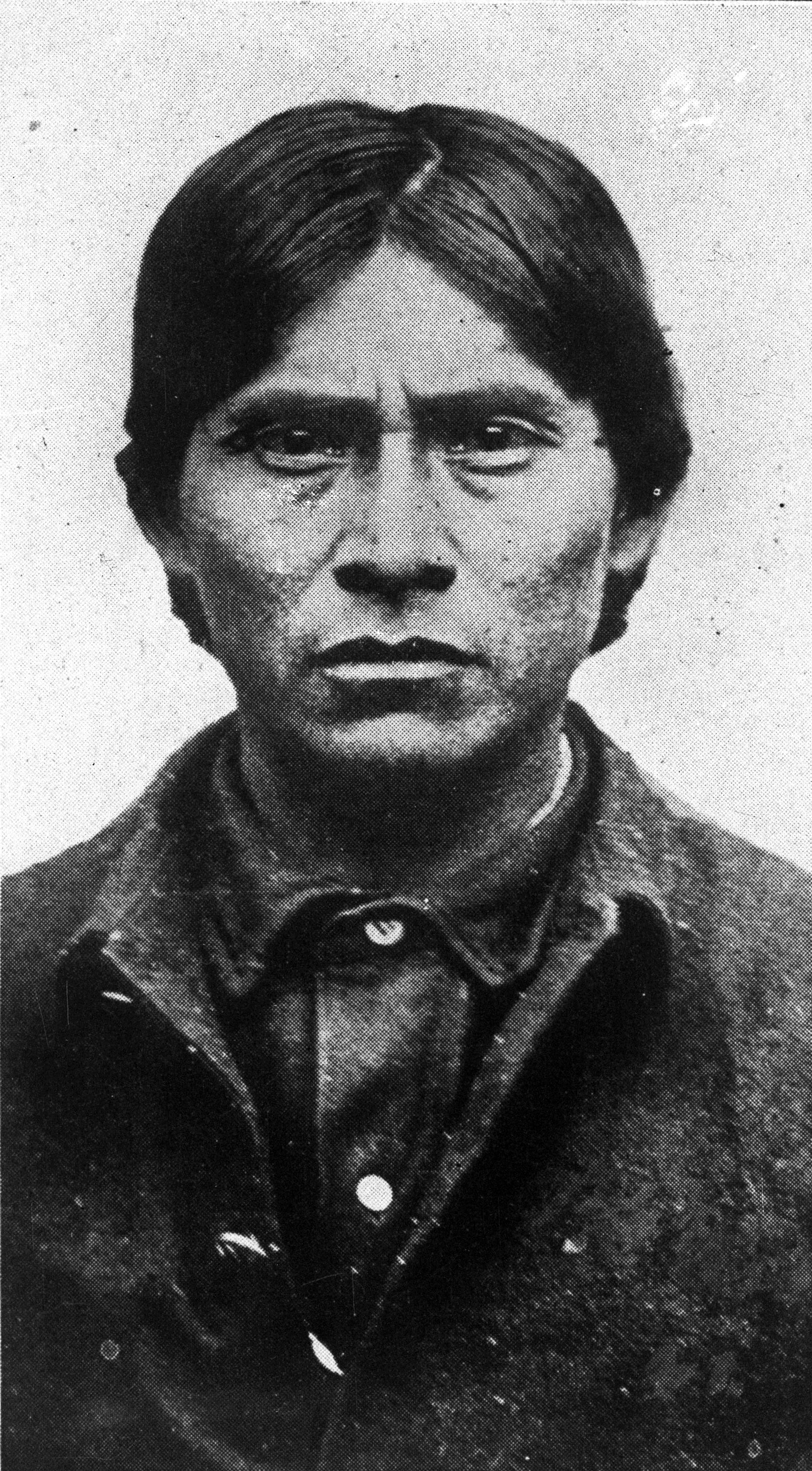
The Apache Kid is the namesake for a Wilderness area in the Cibola National Forest.

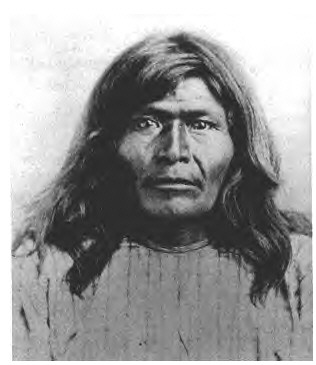
Vicks Peak in the San Mateo Mountains is named for Victorio, an Apache warrior and chief.

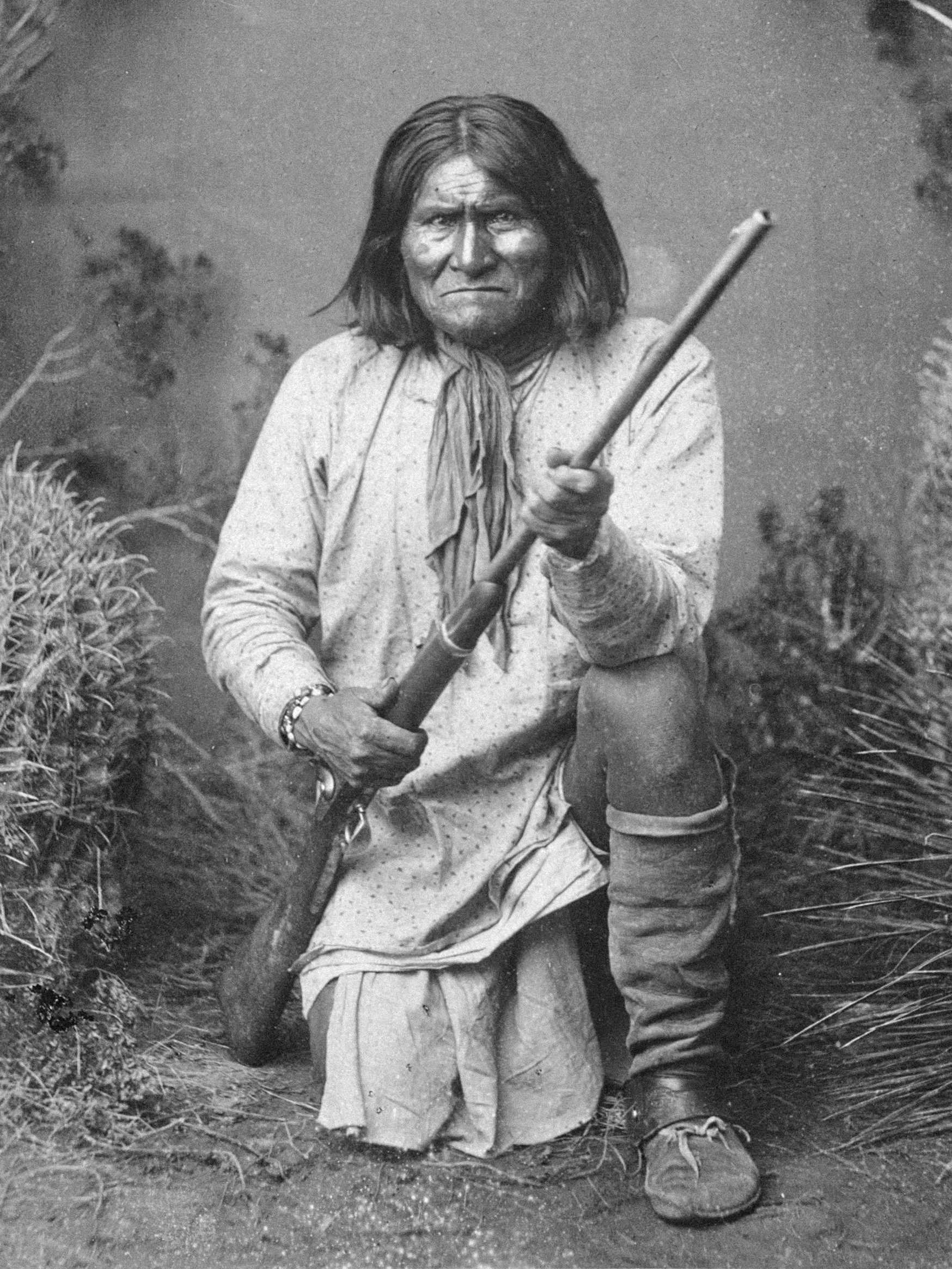
Geronimo (Goyaałé), a Bedonkohe Apache; kneeling with rifle, 1887

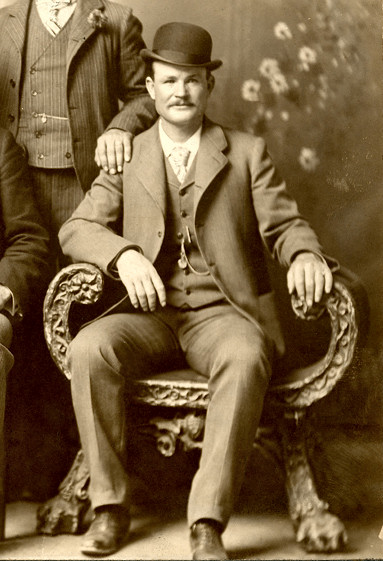
Butch Cassidy poses in the Wild Bunch group photo, Fort Worth, Texas, 1901.

A mining rush followed the Apache wars – gold, silver, and copper were found in the mountains. It wasn’t until this time that extensive use of the area by non-Native Americans occurred. While some mining activity, involving gold, silver, and copper, occurred in the southern part of the range near the end of the nineteenth century, the prospecting/mining remnants are barely visible today due to collapse, topographic screening, and vegetation regrowth. While miners combed the mountains for mineral riches during the late nineteenth and early twentieth centuries, stockmen drove tens of thousands of sheep and cattle to stockyards at the village of Magdalena, then linked by rail with Socorro. In fact, the last regularly used cattle trail in the United States stretched 125 miles westward from Magdalena. The route was formally known as the Magdalena Livestock Driveway, but more popularly known to cowboys and cattlemen as the Beefsteak Trail. The trail began use in 1865 and its peak was in 1919. The trail was used continually until trailing gave way to trucking and the trail officially closed in 1971.

== Fires ==
In 2008 the Trigo Fire burned 13,709 acres (55.48 km^{2}) mostly within the Mountainair Ranger District of the Cibola National Forest.

== See also ==
- List of national forests of the United States
