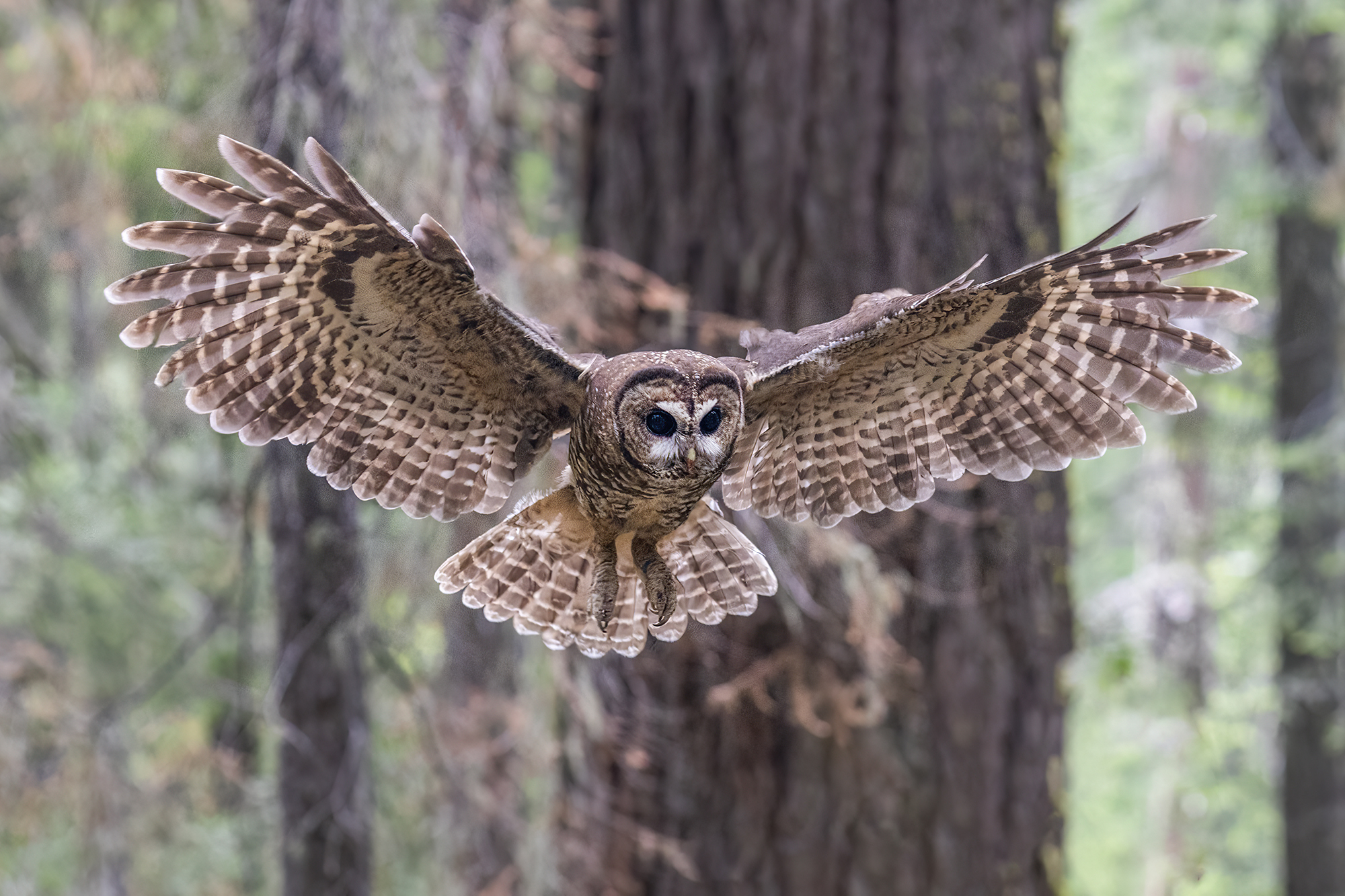
- Northern subspecies

Conservation status
- Near Threatened (IUCN 3.1)
- CITES Appendix II

Scientific classification
- Kingdom: Animalia
- Phylum: Chordata
- Class: Aves
- Order: Strigiformes
- Family: Strigidae
- Genus: Strix
- Species: S. occidentalis

Binomial name
- Strix occidentalis (Xántus, J, 1860)

Subspecies
- 3, see text

= Spotted owl =

Species of owl

The spotted owl (Strix occidentalis) is a species of true owl. It is a resident species of old-growth forests in western North America, where it nests in tree hollows, old bird of prey nests, or rock crevices. Nests can be between 12 and 60 metres (40 and 200 ft) from the ground, and usually contain two eggs (though some contain as many as four). It is a nocturnal owl which feeds on small mammals and birds. Three subspecies are recognized, ranging in distribution from British Columbia to Mexico. The spotted owl is under pressure from habitat destruction throughout its range, and is currently classified as a near-threatened species.

== Description ==
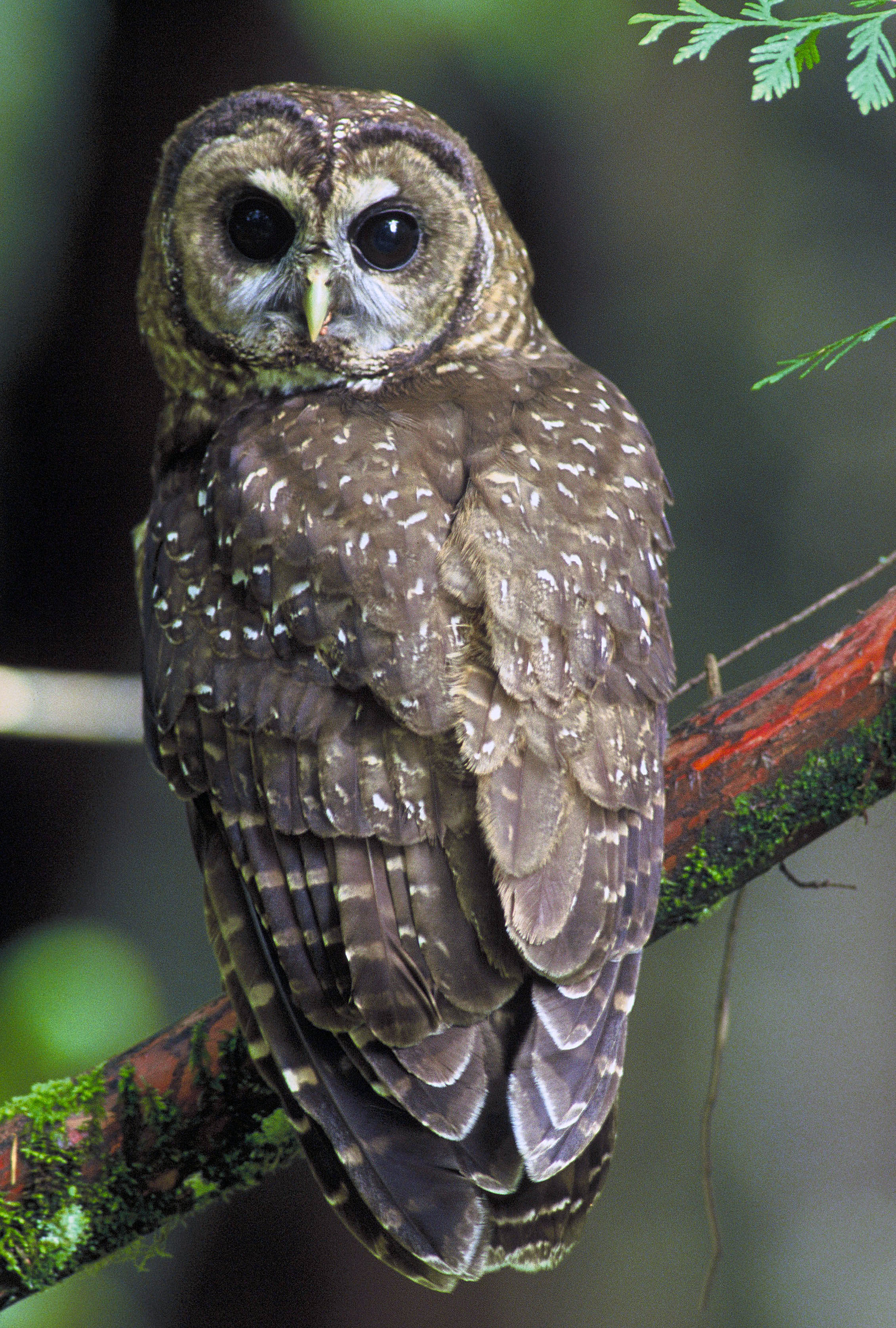

The spotted owl has an average length of 43 cm (17 in), wingspan of 114 cm (45 in), and weight of 600 g (1.3 lb). Its eggs are a little over 50 mm (2.0 in) long, and are white and smooth with a slightly grainy texture. The spotted owl is similar in appearance to the barred owl, but has cross-shaped markings on the underparts, whereas the barred owl is alternately barred on the breast and streaked on the belly. Barred owls are larger and grayer than spotted owls. In recent years, the California and northern subspecies of spotted owl have been displaced by barred owls (S. varia), which are more aggressive, have a broader diet, and occur in more varied habitats. Though the two species are genetically quite distinct, they may hybridize in areas where displacement is occurring, resulting in an interspecific hybrid owl referred to as a "sparred owl".

== Subspecies ==
- S. o. caurina – Northern spotted owl
- S. o. lucida – Mexican spotted owl
- S. o. occidentalis – California spotted owl

The Gila Wilderness is home to the largest population of the Mexican subspecies.

== Distribution ==
The northern spotted owl has a nearly contiguous range from southwestern British Columbia south through western Washington and Oregon to Marin County, California. The California spotted owl's range overlaps this range in the southern Cascade Range, and extends south through the western Sierra Nevada to Tulare County, with discrete populations in mountainous areas of coastal and southern California from Monterey County to northern Baja California. The Mexican spotted owl occurs in disjunct populations in mountain ranges and canyons of the Southwestern US (including Utah, Colorado, Arizona, New Mexico, and extreme western Texas), as well as in western Mexico (Sonora, Chihuahua, Nuevo León, and eastern Coahuila) through the Sierra Madre Occidental and the Sierra Madre Oriental.

== Habitat ==
Spotted owls occur in a variety of hardwood and coniferous forest habitats, although the species prefers closed-canopy, uneven-aged, late-successional, and old-growth forests. The Mexican subspecies may also make use of chaparral and pinyon woodlands, including areas in deep, steep-walled canyons with little canopy cover. The California subspecies uses unlogged, complex early seral forests created by wildfire for foraging, and more high-severity fire in a territory increases reproduction.

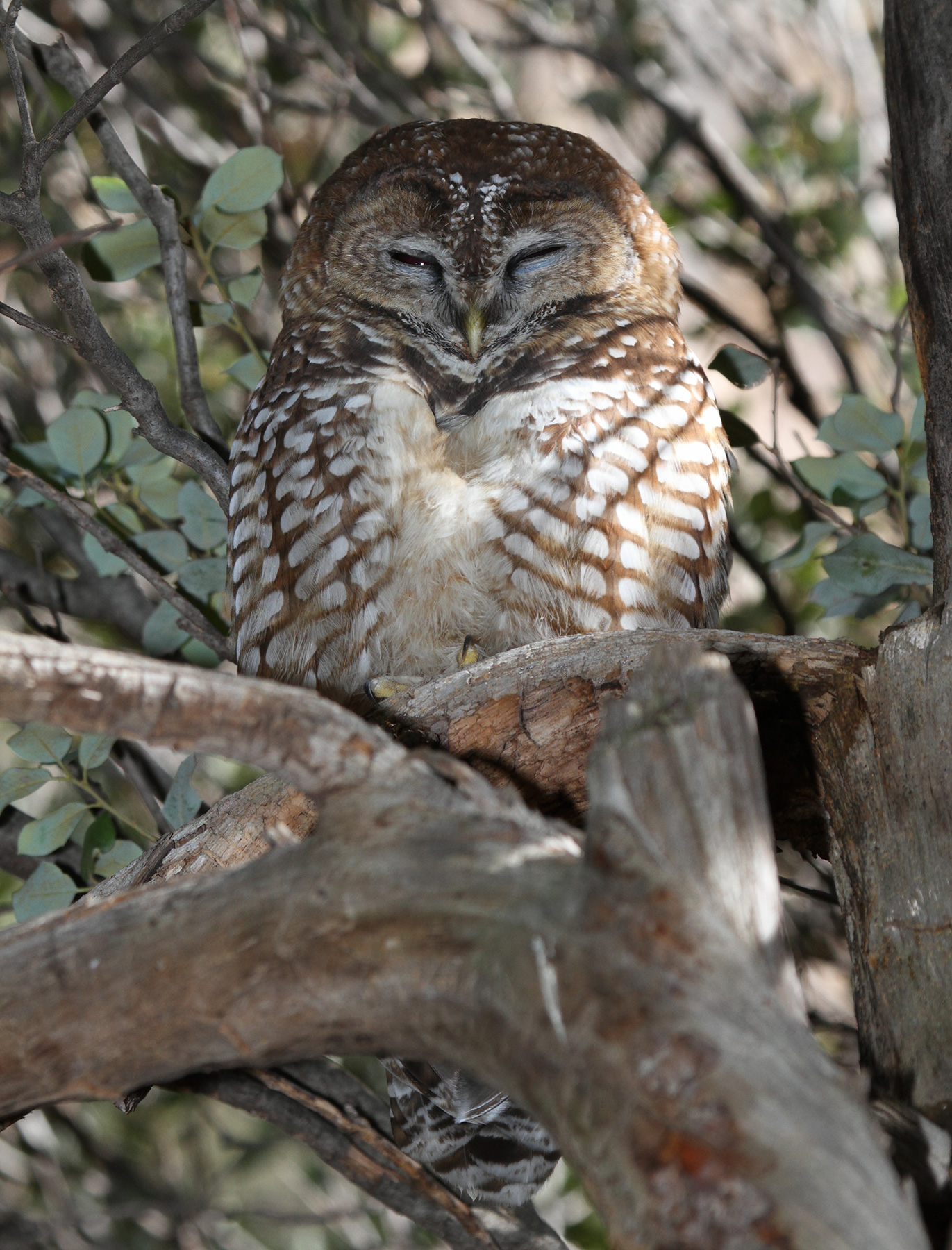
Mexican spotted owl, Fort Huachuca, Arizona

Large trees seem to constitute preferred nesting and roosting habitat for all three subspecies, and canopy cover greater than 40% (often greater than 70%) is generally sought out. Substantial tall shrub cover is a common characteristic of spotted owl habitat. Spotted owls can be found at elevations of 70–6,600 feet (21–2,012 m) for the northern subspecies, at 1,000–8,500 feet (300–2,590 m) for the California subspecies, and rather higher (6,000–8,500 feet (1,800–2,600 m)) for the Mexican spotted owl. All subspecies appear to value the proximity of water sources.

== Ecology ==
=== Home range and density ===
Spotted owl home ranges are generally large but of variable size, with extents of 661–14,169 acres (2.67–57.34 km^{2}), depending on subspecies, habitat, and prey availability. Home ranges are smaller in the breeding season than in the nonbreeding season, and females have larger home ranges than males.

Density of spotted owl pairs within suitable habitat also depends on specific habitat quality and location, varying between 0.022 owls/km^{2} in pinyon-juniper woodlands of the Sacramento Mountains and 1.049 owls/km^{2}.

=== Nesting ===
Spotted owls do not build their own nests, instead making use of cavities found in trees, deadwood, and snags, as well as the sites of abandoned raptor or squirrel nests. Some nest sites are used repeatedly. High-quality (consistently occupied and reproductive) breeding sites remain occupied after wildfire and post-fire salvage logging, while lower quality sites that are inconsistently occupied and reproductive are more likely to be abandoned after fire and salvage logging. Spotted owls most often choose the same type of cover selected for nesting sites for daytime roosting.

=== Breeding ===
The spotted owl's breeding season occurs from early spring to late summer or fall, with prelaying behaviors such as preening and roosting together starting in February or March.

Spotted owl pairs are monogamous and rarely re-nest after failed breeding attempts. The species does not normally breed every year, with average breeding probability being 62%. Young owls may start breeding after one year but two years or older is more common. Normal clutch size is two eggs but may reach four on rare occasions. The female sits on the eggs and cares for the young, while the male provides food for them. Egg incubation times of about a month have been reported from western Oregon; time from fledging to independence of chicks is between three and four months. Once independent, juveniles disperse in late summer to fall, in the northern range often settling into a wintering range before seeking out breeding territories in the spring. Dispersal range is often less than 19 mi (31 km).

=== Lifespan and mortality ===
Spotted owls are long-lived and maximum ages of 16 or 17 years have been documented in the northern subspecies. The average annual survival rate is usually in excess of 80% for adults, although it is considerably lower for juveniles, which have an average annual survival rate of 21–29%. In New Mexico, the survival rate for fledgling Mexican spotted owls can be as low as 11%. The most common causes of mortality are predation, starvation, and possibly disease.

Various birds and mammals such as the fisher (Pekania pennanti) are among the predators of eggs and young spotted owls, American goshawks (Accipiter atricapillus), crows may prey on juvenile spotted owls, while great horned owls (Bubo virginianus), red-tailed hawks (Buteo jamaicensis), and golden eagles (Aquila chrysaetos) are likely predators of both juveniles and adults. Great horned and barred owls compete with spotted owls for food and space in some areas. Barred owls have a negative effect on northern spotted owl survival and fecundity. There are also negative effects when Barred owls live in the same area as spotted owls.

Spotted owls are nocturnal, sit-and-wait predators. They often hunt from a perch and swoop or pounce on prey, or may take arboreal prey from tree boles and limbs. They do occasionally hunt during the day. Although diet varies with location, the majority consists of a few mammalian species. Species taken most often are northern flying squirrels (which may comprise more than 30% of total prey) and woodrats (the most common prey overall), including dusky-footed (Neotoma fuscipes), bushy-tailed, (N. cinerea), and Mexican woodrats (N. mexicana). In some portions of its range, much of the spotted owl's diet is composed of several other mammals such as deer mice (Peromyscus maniculatus), pocket gophers (Thomomys spp.), voles (Microtus, Clethrionomys, and Phenocomys spp.), snowshoe hares (Lepus americanus), rabbits, and several species of squirrels. Bats and non-mammalian prey species are taken to a lesser extent, including birds (smaller owls, jays, woodpeckers, and passerines, including various songbirds), amphibians, reptiles, and insects.

== Conservation ==
The IUCN Red List status for the spotted owl is near threatened with a decreasing population trend. NatureServe considers the species Vulnerable. All studies assessing the species' population trend have found populations to be in decline. Habitat loss due to timber harvesting is generally recognized as the main threat. One study reported that competition with the barred owl is also a major contributor to the decline of the spotted owl. Forest and spotted owl management documents often state that severe wildfire is a cause of recent declines in populations of spotted owls, and that mixed-severity fires (5–70% of burned area in high-severity patches, with >75% mortality of dominant vegetation) pose a primary threat to spotted owl population viability, but a systematic review and meta-analysis found fires created more benefits than costs for spotted owls.

The northern spotted owl and Mexican spotted owl subspecies are listed as threatened in the United States under the Endangered Species Act (ESA). On February 23, 2023, The California spotted owl was proposed for listing under the Endangered Species Act by the U.S. Fish and Wildlife Service (USFWS) after 20 years of attempts by environmental groups to get it listed. The Coastal-Southern California distinct population segment (DPS) is proposed for endangered status, while the Sierra Nevada DPS is proposed for threatened status with a 4D rule exception. The northern spotted owl was one of a few cases where the "God committee", a provision of the Endangered Species Act, has been invoked to decide whether or not to open up more federal forest for commercial logging. In a battle between two federal agencies, the Bureau of Land Management, and the Fish and Wildlife Service, the committee ruled for the exemption of 1,700 acres from the ESA. The legal battle went on at different levels, creating a complex case study in environmental law.

Each subspecies of the spotted owl is a frequent subject of disagreement between conservationists and loggers, cattle grazers, developers, and other organizations whose activities can affect forest conservation. In February 2008, a federal judge reinforced a USFWS decision to designate 8,600,000 acres (35,000 km^{2}) in Arizona, Utah, Colorado, and New Mexico as critical habitat for the Mexican spotted owl. The decision was challenged by the Arizona Cattle Growers' Association, but the decision was upheld on appeal.

By 2006, the northern spotted owl was reported to be in rapid decline in the northernmost part of its range, with a 7.2% annual decline across northern Washington and southwestern British Columbia. Fewer than 30 breeding pairs were thought to exist in Canada in 2006, and some experts have predicted the imminent extirpation of the species from Canada.

An experiment sanctioned by the USFWS investigated the suitability of protecting the spotted owl by controlling its competitor, the barred owl. Work began in 2009 by removing populations of barred owls in designated areas. The studies found that in the absence of barred owls, the population of spotted owls did not decline, and were able to bounce back.
