= List of mountain peaks of New Mexico =

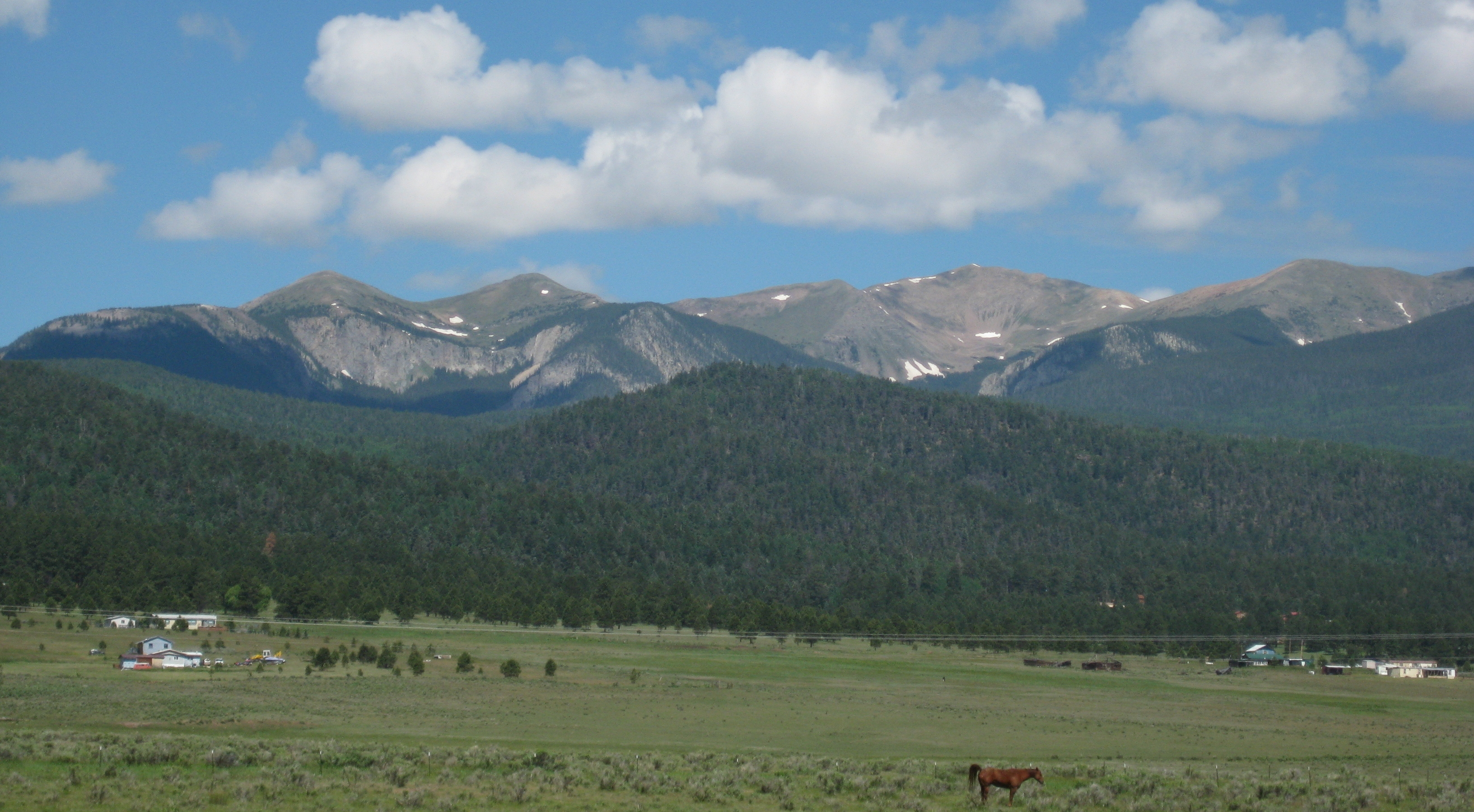
Wheeler Peak is the highest summit of the U.S. State of New Mexico.

This article comprises three sortable tables of major mountain peaks of the U.S. State of New Mexico.

The summit of a mountain or hill may be measured in three principal ways:

1. The topographic elevation of a summit measures the height of the summit above a geodetic sea level. The first table below ranks the 30 highest major summits of New Mexico by elevation.
2. The topographic prominence of a summit is a measure of how high the summit rises above its surroundings. The second table below ranks the 30 most prominent summits of New Mexico.
3. The topographic isolation (or radius of dominance) of a summit measures how far the summit lies from its nearest point of equal elevation. The third table below ranks the 30 most isolated major summits of New Mexico.

== Highest major summits ==
Of the highest major summits of New Mexico, Wheeler Peak exceeds 4000 meters (13,123 feet) elevation, 11 peaks exceed 3500 meters (11,483 feet), and 26 peaks exceed 3000 meters (9843 feet) elevation.

The 30 highest summits of New Mexico with at least 500 meters of topographic prominence
Rank	Mountain peak	Mountain range	Elevation	Prominence	Isolation	Location
1	Wheeler Peak (Note: The summit of Wheeler Peak is the highest point of the Taos Mountains and the U.S. State of New Mexico.) (Note: Wheeler Peak is the southernmost 4000-meter (13,123-foot) summit of the Rocky Mountains.)	Taos Mountains	13,167 ft 4013.3 m	3,409 ft 1039 m	37 mi 59.6 km	36.5569°N 105.4169°W
2	Truchas Peak (Note: The summit of Truchas Peak is the highest point of the Santa Fe Mountains.) (Note: Truchas Peak is the southernmost summit of its elevation in the Rocky Mountains.)	Santa Fe Mountains	13,108 ft 3995.2 m	4,001 ft 1220 m	42.3 mi 68.2 km	35.9625°N 105.6450°W
3	Venado Peak (Note: The elevation of Venado Peak includes an adjustment of +1.65 m (5.41 ft) from NGVD 29 to NAVD 88.)	Taos Mountains	12,739 ft 3883 m	2,971 ft 906 m	11.8 mi 18.99 km	36.7917°N 105.4933°W
4	Gold Hill	Taos Mountains	12,700 ft 3871 m	1,715 ft 523 m	6.06 mi 9.76 km	36.6432°N 105.4560°W
5	Santa Fe Baldy	Santa Fe Mountains	12,632 ft 3850.1 m	2,002 ft 610 m	10.99 mi 17.69 km	35.8322°N 105.7581°W
6	Little Costilla Peak	Culebra Range	12,588 ft 3836.8 m	2,444 ft 745 m	7.75 mi 12.48 km	36.8335°N 105.2229°W
7	Baldy Mountain (Note: The summit of Baldy Mountain is the highest point of the Cimarron Range.)	Cimarron Range	12,445 ft 3793.3 m	2,701 ft 823 m	11.33 mi 18.24 km	36.6299°N 105.2134°W
8	Sierra Blanca Peak (Note: The summit of Sierra Blanca Peak is the highest point of the Sacramento Mountains.)	Sacramento Mountains	11,981 ft 3651.8 m	5,553 ft 1693 m	165.7 mi 267 km	33.3743°N 105.8087°W
9	Cerro Vista (Note: The summit of Cerro Vista is the highest point of the southern Sangre de Cristo Range.)	Sangre de Cristo Mountains	11,937 ft 3638.3 m	2,519 ft 768 m	14.19 mi 22.8 km	36.2353°N 105.4108°W
10	Mount Phillips	Cimarron Range	11,742 ft 3578.9 m	2,921 ft 890 m	7.51 mi 12.09 km	36.4766°N 105.1595°W
11	Chicoma Mountain (Note: The summit of Chicoma Mountain is the highest point of the Jemez Mountains.)	Jemez Mountains	11,561 ft 3523.8 m	4,291 ft 1308 m	35.3 mi 56.8 km	36.0073°N 106.3846°W
12	Mount Taylor (Note: The summit of Mount Taylor is the highest point of the northern San Mateo Mountains.)	San Mateo Mountains	11,305 ft 3445.9 m	4,094 ft 1248 m	86.8 mi 139.6 km	35.2387°N 107.6085°W
13	Redondo Peak	Jemez Mountains	11,258 ft 3431.5 m	2,464 ft 751 m	13.58 mi 21.9 km	35.8720°N 106.5606°W
14	San Antonio Mountain	Tusas Mountains	10,912 ft 3326.1 m	2,118 ft 646 m	19.42 mi 31.3 km	36.8594°N 106.0187°W
15	Whitewater Baldy (Note: The summit of Whitewater Baldy is the highest point of the Mogollon Mountains.) (Note: The elevation of Whitewater Baldy includes an adjustment of +1.273 m (4.18 ft) from NGVD 29 to NAVD 88.)	Mogollon Mountains	10,899 ft 3322 m	3,545 ft 1081 m	51.6 mi 83.1 km	33.3239°N 108.6423°W
16	Picuris Peak	Sangre de Cristo Range	10,802 ft 3292.5 m	2,261 ft 689 m	9.94 mi 16 km	36.2473°N 105.6549°W
17	South Baldy (Note: The summit of South Baldy is the highest point of the Magdalena Mountains.)	Magdalena Mountains	10,787 ft 3288 m	3,813 ft 1162 m	88.1 mi 141.7 km	33.9910°N 107.1879°W
18	Sandia Crest (Note: The summit of Sandia Crest is the highest point of the Sandia Mountains.) (Note: The elevation of Sandia Crest includes an adjustment of +1.101 m (3.61 ft) from NGVD 29 to NAVD 88.)	Sandia Mountains	10,682 ft 3256 m	4,108 ft 1252 m	45.3 mi 72.9 km	35.2101°N 106.4495°W
19	San Pedro Peaks (Note: The elevation of San Pedro Peaks includes an adjustment of +1.306 m (4.28 ft) from NGVD 29 to NAVD 88.)	Jemez Mountains	10,614 ft 3235 m	1,664 ft 507 m	22.1 mi 35.5 km	36.1228°N 106.8139°W
20	West Blue Mountain (Note: The summit of West Blue Mountain is the highest point of the San Mateo Mountains.) (Note: The elevation of West Blue Mountain includes an adjustment of +1.112 m (3.65 ft) from NGVD 29 to NAVD 88.)	San Mateo Mountains	10,340 ft 3152 m	3,146 ft 959 m	26 mi 41.8 km	33.6650°N 107.4458°W
21	Alegres Mountain (Note: The elevation of Alegres Mountain includes an adjustment of +1.078 m (3.54 ft) from NGVD 29 to NAVD 88.)	Colorado Plateau	10,240 ft 3121 m	2,379 ft 725 m	54.5 mi 87.7 km	34.1575°N 108.1894°W
22	Capitan Mountains high point (Note: The elevation of Capitan Mountains high point includes an adjustment of +0.963 m (3.16 ft) from NGVD 29 to NAVD 88.)	Capitan Mountains	10,204 ft 3110 m	3,271 ft 997 m	28.1 mi 45.2 km	33.6013°N 105.3436°W
23	McKnight Mountain (Note: The summit of McKnight Mountain is the highest point of the Black Range.) (Note: The elevation of McKnight Mountain includes an adjustment of +1.193 m (3.91 ft) from NGVD 29 to NAVD 88.)	Black Range	10,169 ft 3099 m	2,545 ft 776 m	42 mi 67.6 km	33.0518°N 107.8503°W
24	Mount Withington	San Mateo Mountains	10,122 ft 3085.3 m	2,335 ft 712 m	15.04 mi 24.2 km	33.8806°N 107.4860°W
25	Manzano Peak (Note: The summit of Manzano Peak is the highest point of the Manzano Mountains.)	Manzano Mountains	10,100 ft 3078.5 m	3,248 ft 990 m	42.2 mi 67.9 km	34.5910°N 106.4468°W
26	Ute Mountain (Note: The elevation of Ute Mountain includes an adjustment of +1.288 m (4.23 ft) from NGVD 29 to NAVD 88.)	Taos Mountains	10,097 ft 3078 m	2,488 ft 758 m	10.75 mi 17.3 km	36.9376°N 105.6841°W
27	Atalaya Mountain (Note: The summit of Atalaya Mountain is the highest point of the Santa Fe Mountains.)	Santa Fe Mountains	9,603 ft 2927 m	2,655 ft 809 m	14.01 mi 22.5 km	33.6908°N 105.7285°W
28	Ladrones Benchmark (Note: The summit of Ladrones Benchmark is the highest point of Sierra Ladrones.)	Sierra Ladrones	9,186 ft 2799.9 m	3,140 ft 957 m	25.8 mi 41.5 km	34.4348°N 107.0851°W
29	Organ Needle (Note: The summit of Organ Needle is the highest point of the San Andres Mountains.) (Note: The elevation of Organ Needle includes an adjustment of +0.738 m (2.42 ft) from NGVD 29 to NAVD 88.)	San Andres Mountains	8,992 ft 2741 m	3,730 ft 1137 m	52 mi 83.7 km	32.3452°N 106.5620°W
30	Salinas Peak	San Andres Mountains	8,967 ft 2733.2 m	3,625 ft 1105 m	39.9 mi 64.2 km	33.2985°N 106.5314°W

== Most prominent summits ==
Of the most prominent summits of New Mexico, Sierra Blanca Peak is an ultra-prominent summit with more than 1500 meters (4921 feet) of topographic prominence and 12 peaks exceed 1000 meters (3281 feet) of topographic prominence.

The 30 most topographically prominent summits of New Mexico
Rank	Mountain peak	Mountain range	Elevation	Prominence	Isolation	Location
1	Sierra Blanca Peak	Sacramento Mountains	11,981 ft 3651.8 m	5,553 ft 1693 m	165.7 mi 267 km	33.3743°N 105.8087°W
2	Chicoma Mountain	Jemez Mountains	11,561 ft 3523.8 m	4,291 ft 1308 m	35.3 mi 56.8 km	36.0073°N 106.3846°W
3	Sandia Crest	Sandia Mountains	10,682 ft 3256 m	4,108 ft 1252 m	45.3 mi 72.9 km	35.2101°N 106.4495°W
4	Mount Taylor	San Mateo Mountains	11,305 ft 3445.9 m	4,094 ft 1248 m	86.8 mi 139.6 km	35.2387°N 107.6085°W
5	Truchas Peak	Santa Fe Mountains	13,108 ft 3995.2 m	4,001 ft 1220 m	42.3 mi 68.2 km	35.9625°N 105.6450°W
6	South Baldy (Note: The summit of South Baldy is the highest point of the Magdalena Mountains.)	Magdalena Mountains	10,787 ft 3288 m	3,813 ft 1162 m	88.1 mi 141.7 km	33.9910°N 107.1879°W
7	Organ Needle	San Andres Mountains	8,992 ft 2741 m	3,730 ft 1137 m	52 mi 83.7 km	32.3452°N 106.5620°W
8	Big Hatchet Peak	Animas Mountains	8,369 ft 2551 m	3,706 ft 1130 m	23 mi 37 km	31.6354°N 108.3987°W
9	Salinas Peak	San Andres Mountains	8,967 ft 2733.2 m	3,625 ft 1105 m	39.9 mi 64.2 km	33.2985°N 106.5314°W
10	Whitewater Baldy	Mogollon Mountains	10,899 ft 3322 m	3,545 ft 1081 m	51.6 mi 83.1 km	33.3239°N 108.6423°W
11	Wheeler Peak	Taos Mountains	13,167 ft 4013.3 m	3,409 ft 1039 m	37 mi 59.6 km	36.5569°N 105.4169°W
12	Animas Mountains high point (Note: The elevation of Animas Mountains high point includes an adjustment of +0.979 m (3.21 ft) from NGVD 29 to NAVD 88.)	Animas Mountains	8,568 ft 2612 m	3,284 ft 1001 m	31.4 mi 50.6 km	31.5695°N 108.7887°W
13	Capitan Mountains high point	Capitan Mountains	10,204 ft 3110 m	3,271 ft 997 m	28.1 mi 45.2 km	33.6013°N 105.3436°W
14	Manzano Peak	Manzano Mountains	10,100 ft 3078.5 m	3,248 ft 990 m	42.2 mi 67.9 km	34.5910°N 106.4468°W
15	Florida Peak (Note: The summit of Florida Peak is the highest point of the Florida Mountains.) (Note: The elevation of Florida Peak includes an adjustment of +0.647 m (2.12 ft) from NGVD 29 to NAVD 88.)	Florida Mountains	7,462 ft 2274 m	3,215 ft 980 m	26.8 mi 43.1 km	32.1265°N 107.6230°W
16	West Blue Mountain	San Mateo Mountains	10,340 ft 3152 m	3,146 ft 959 m	26 mi 41.8 km	33.6650°N 107.4458°W
17	Ladrones Benchmark	Sierra Ladrones	9,186 ft 2799.9 m	3,140 ft 957 m	25.8 mi 41.5 km	34.4348°N 107.0851°W
18	Venado Peak	Taos Mountains	12,739 ft 3883 m	2,971 ft 906 m	11.8 mi 18.99 km	36.7917°N 105.4933°W
19	Mount Phillips	Cimarron Range	11,742 ft 3578.9 m	2,921 ft 890 m	7.51 mi 12.09 km	36.4766°N 105.1595°W
20	Baldy Mountain	Cimarron Range	12,445 ft 3793.3 m	2,701 ft 823 m	11.33 mi 18.24 km	36.6299°N 105.2134°W
21	Carrizo Peak (Note: The summit of Carrizo Peak is the highest point of the Carrizo Mountains.)	Carrizo Mountains	9,603 ft 2927 m	2,655 ft 809 m	14.01 mi 22.5 km	33.6908°N 105.7285°W
22	Cookes Peak (Note: The summit of Cookes Peak is the highest point of the Cookes Range.)	Cookes Range	8,411 ft 2563.8 m	2,588 ft 789 m	22.3 mi 35.9 km	32.5360°N 107.7315°W
23	McKnight Mountain	Black Range	10,169 ft 3099 m	2,545 ft 776 m	42 mi 67.6 km	33.0518°N 107.8503°W
24	San Andres Peak	San Andres Mountains	8,244 ft 2512.7 m	2,525 ft 770 m	22.8 mi 36.8 km	32.6760°N 106.5368°W
25	Cerro Vista	Sangre de Cristo Mountains	11,937 ft 3638.3 m	2,519 ft 768 m	14.19 mi 22.8 km	36.2353°N 105.4108°W
26	Ute Mountain	Taos Mountains	10,097 ft 3078 m	2,488 ft 758 m	10.75 mi 17.3 km	36.9376°N 105.6841°W
27	Redondo Peak	Jemez Mountains	11,258 ft 3431.5 m	2,464 ft 751 m	13.58 mi 21.9 km	35.8720°N 106.5606°W
28	Little Costilla Peak	Culebra Range	12,588 ft 3836.8 m	2,444 ft 745 m	7.75 mi 12.48 km	36.8335°N 105.2229°W
29	Alegres Mountain	Colorado Plateau	10,240 ft 3121 m	2,379 ft 725 m	54.5 mi 87.7 km	34.1575°N 108.1894°W
30	Wind Mountain	Cornudas Mountains	7,269 ft 2215.6 m	2,350 ft 716 m	37.2 mi 59.8 km	32.0254°N 105.5161°W

== Most isolated major summits ==
Of the most isolated major summits of New Mexico, Sierra Blanca Peak exceeds 200 kilometers (124.3 miles) of topographic isolation and three peaks exceed 100 kilometers (62.14 miles) of topographic isolation.

The 30 most topographically isolated summits of New Mexico with at least 500 meters of topographic prominence
Rank	Mountain peak	Mountain range	Elevation	Prominence	Isolation	Location
1	Sierra Blanca Peak	Sacramento Mountains	11,981 ft 3651.8 m	5,553 ft 1693 m	165.7 mi 267 km	33.3743°N 105.8087°W
2	South Baldy	Magdalena Mountains	10,787 ft 3288 m	3,813 ft 1162 m	88.1 mi 141.7 km	33.9910°N 107.1879°W
3	Mount Taylor	San Mateo Mountains	11,305 ft 3445.9 m	4,094 ft 1248 m	86.8 mi 139.6 km	35.2387°N 107.6085°W
4	Alegres Mountain	Colorado Plateau	10,240 ft 3121 m	2,379 ft 725 m	54.5 mi 87.7 km	34.1575°N 108.1894°W
5	Organ Needle	San Andres Mountains	8,992 ft 2741 m	3,730 ft 1137 m	52 mi 83.7 km	32.3452°N 106.5620°W
6	Whitewater Baldy	Mogollon Mountains	10,899 ft 3322 m	3,545 ft 1081 m	51.6 mi 83.1 km	33.3239°N 108.6423°W
7	Sandia Crest	Sandia Mountains	10,682 ft 3256 m	4,108 ft 1252 m	45.3 mi 72.9 km	35.2101°N 106.4495°W
8	Truchas Peak	Santa Fe Mountains	13,108 ft 3995.2 m	4,001 ft 1220 m	42.3 mi 68.2 km	35.9625°N 105.6450°W
9	Manzano Peak	Manzano Mountains	10,100 ft 3078.5 m	3,248 ft 990 m	42.2 mi 67.9 km	34.5910°N 106.4468°W
10	McKnight Mountain	Black Range	10,169 ft 3099 m	2,545 ft 776 m	42 mi 67.6 km	33.0518°N 107.8503°W
11	Salinas Peak	San Andres Mountains	8,967 ft 2733.2 m	3,625 ft 1105 m	39.9 mi 64.2 km	33.2985°N 106.5314°W
12	South Sacramento Mountains high point (Note: The elevation of South Sacramento Mountains high point includes an adjustment of +0.962 m (3.16 ft) from NGVD 29 to NAVD 88.)	Sacramento Mountains	2,698 ft 822 m	2,115 ft 645 m	39 mi 62.8 km	32.7741°N 105.7706°W
13	Gallinas Peak (Note: The summit of Gallinas Peak is the highest point of the Gallinas Mountains.) (Note: The summit elevation of Gallinas Peak includes a vertical offset of -0.025 m (-0.1 ft) from the station benchmark.)	Gallinas Mountains	8,640 ft 2633.5 m	2,172 ft 662 m	37.2 mi 59.9 km	34.2471°N 105.7887°W
14	Wind Mountain	Cornudas Mountains	7,269 ft 2215.6 m	2,350 ft 716 m	37.2 mi 59.8 km	32.0254°N 105.5161°W
15	Wheeler Peak	Taos Mountains	13,167 ft 4013.3 m	3,409 ft 1039 m	37 mi 59.6 km	36.5569°N 105.4169°W
16	Chicoma Mountain	Jemez Mountains	11,561 ft 3523.8 m	4,291 ft 1308 m	35.3 mi 56.8 km	36.0073°N 106.3846°W
17	Animas Mountains high point	Animas Mountains	8,568 ft 2612 m	3,284 ft 1001 m	31.4 mi 50.6 km	31.5695°N 108.7887°W
18	Capitan Mountains high point	Capitan Mountains	10,204 ft 3110 m	3,271 ft 997 m	28.1 mi 45.2 km	33.6013°N 105.3436°W
19	Florida Peak	Florida Mountains	7,462 ft 2274 m	3,215 ft 980 m	26.8 mi 43.1 km	32.1265°N 107.6230°W
20	West Blue Mountain	San Mateo Mountains	10,340 ft 3152 m	3,146 ft 959 m	26 mi 41.8 km	33.6650°N 107.4458°W
21	Ladrones Benchmark	Sierra Ladrones	9,186 ft 2799.9 m	3,140 ft 957 m	25.8 mi 41.5 km	34.4348°N 107.0851°W
22	Big Hatchet Peak	Animas Mountains	8,369 ft 2551 m	3,706 ft 1130 m	23 mi 37 km	31.6354°N 108.3987°W
23	San Andres Peak	San Andres Mountains	8,244 ft 2512.7 m	2,525 ft 770 m	22.8 mi 36.8 km	32.6760°N 106.5368°W
24	Cookes Peak	Cookes Range	8,411 ft 2563.8 m	2,588 ft 789 m	22.3 mi 35.9 km	32.5360°N 107.7315°W
25	San Pedro Peaks	Jemez Mountains	10,614 ft 3235 m	1,664 ft 507 m	22.1 mi 35.5 km	36.1228°N 106.8139°W
26	San Antonio Mountain	Tusas Mountains	10,912 ft 3326.1 m	2,118 ft 646 m	19.42 mi 31.3 km	36.8594°N 106.0187°W
27	Laughlin Peak	High Plains	8,824 ft 2689.6 m	1,831 ft 558 m	28.9 mi 46.4 km	36.6253°N 104.18575°W
28	Mount Withington	San Mateo Mountains	10,122 ft 3085.3 m	2,335 ft 712 m	15.04 mi 24.2 km	33.8806°N 107.4860°W
29	Cerro Vista	Sangre de Cristo Mountains	11,937 ft 3638.3 m	2,519 ft 768 m	14.19 mi 22.8 km	36.2353°N 105.4108°W
30	Carrizo Peak	Carrizo Mountains	9,603 ft 2927 m	2,655 ft 809 m	14.01 mi 22.5 km	33.6908°N 105.7285°W
	Redondo Peak	Jemez Mountains	11,258 ft 3431.5 m	2,464 ft 751 m	13.58 mi 21.9 km	35.8720°N 106.5606°W

== Gallery ==
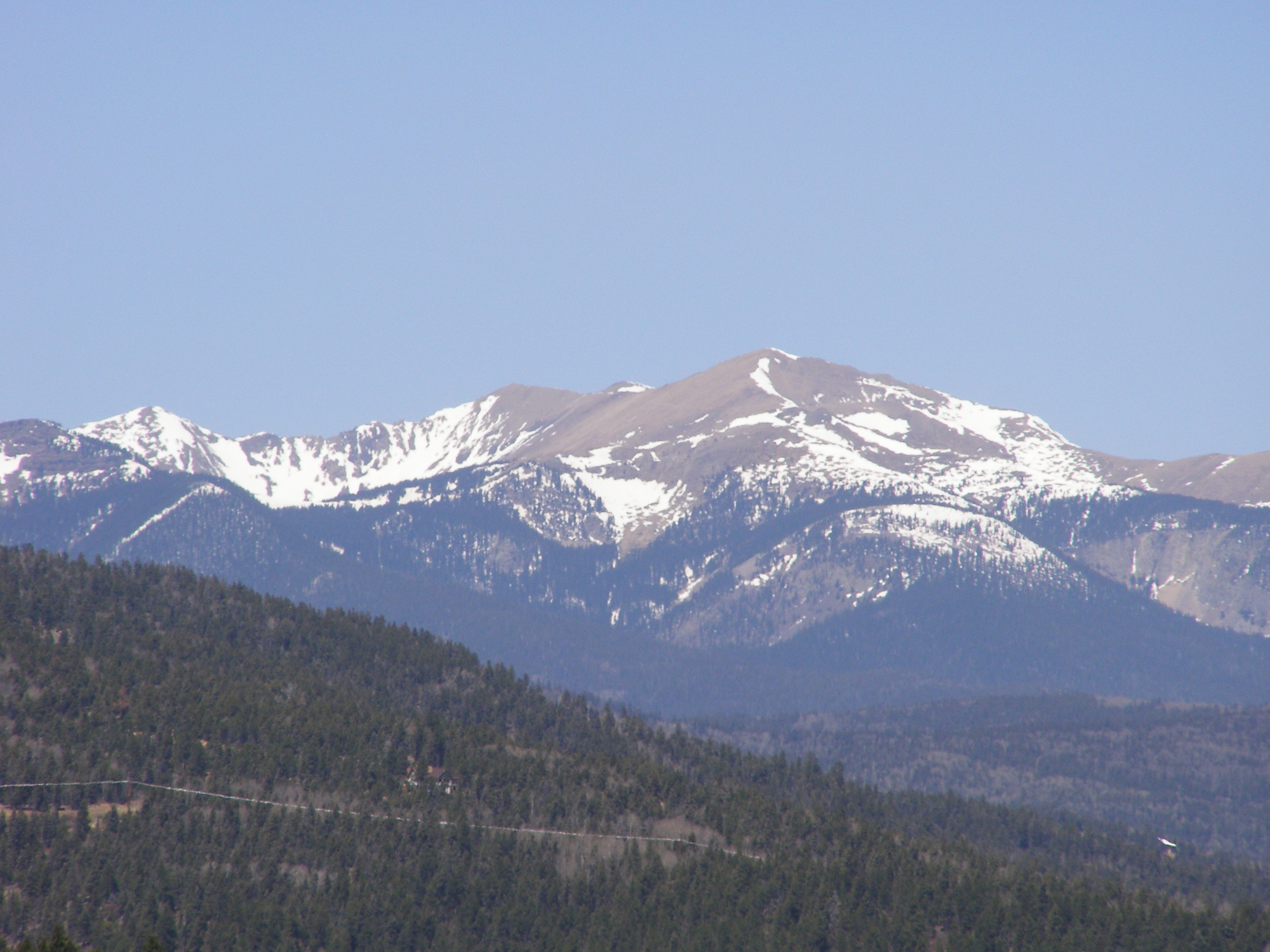
Wheeler Peak

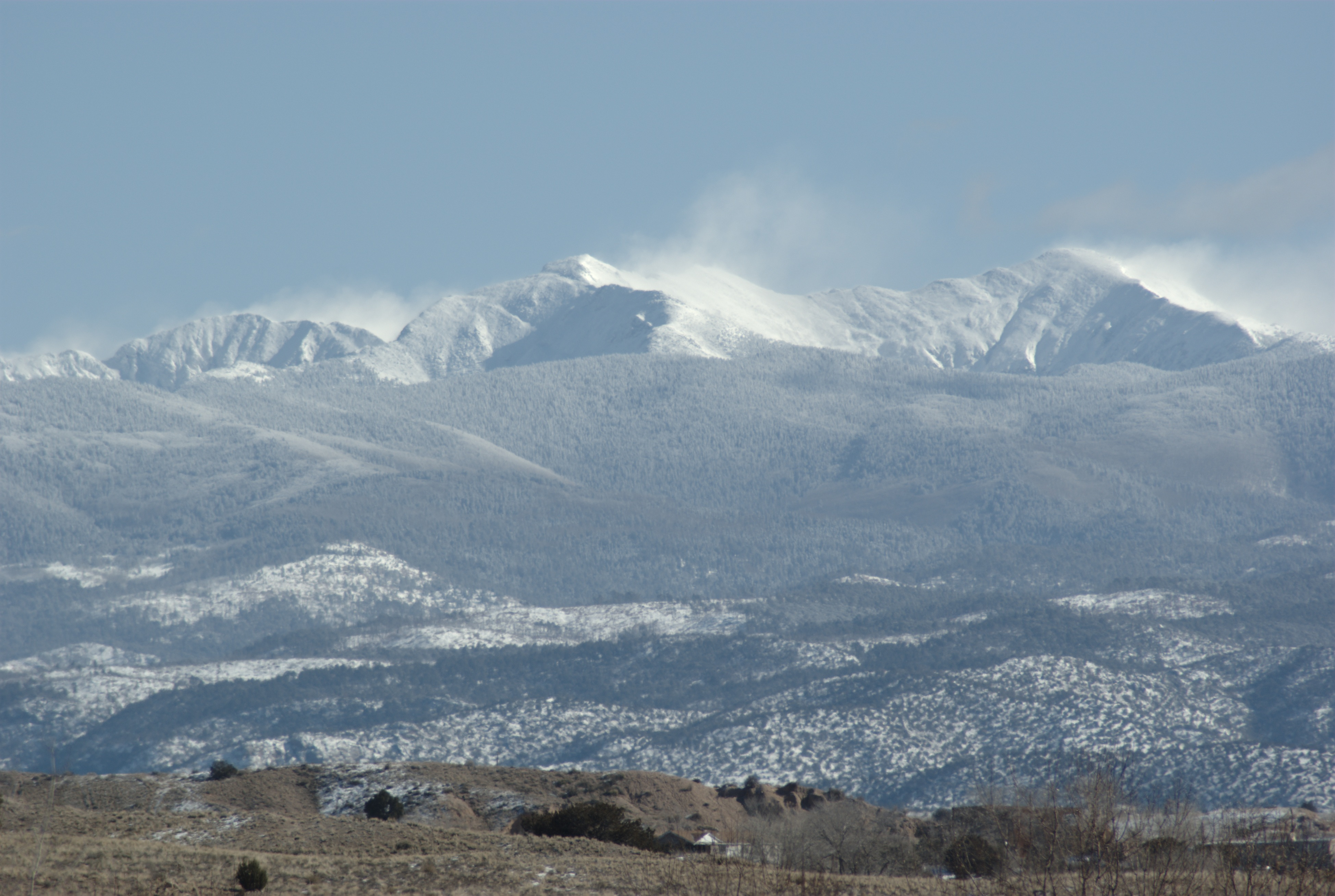
Truchas Peak

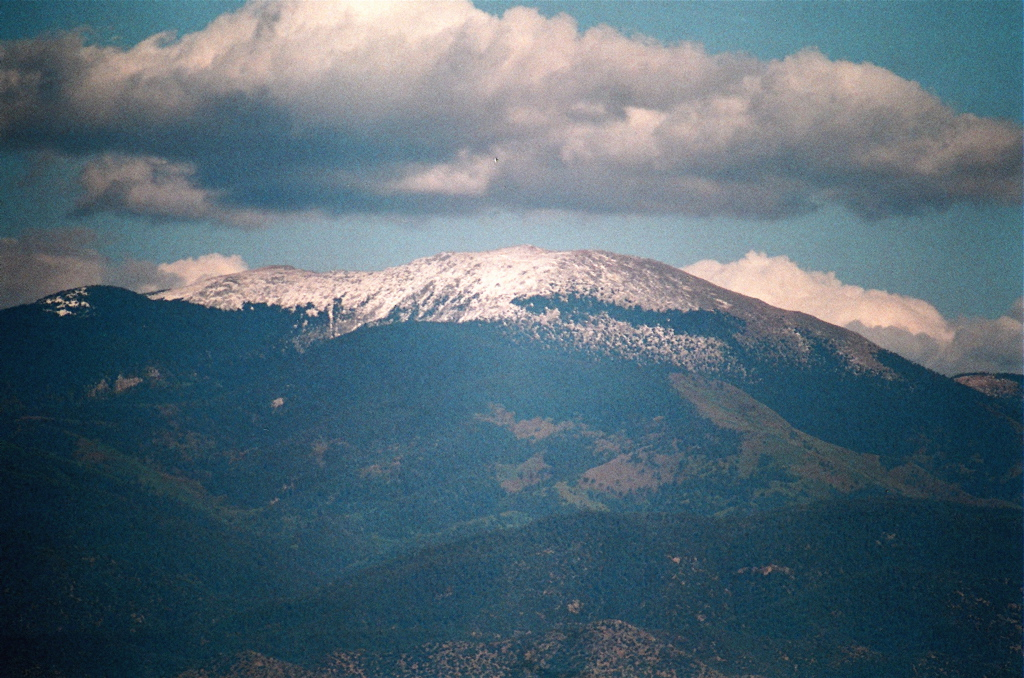
Santa Fe Baldy

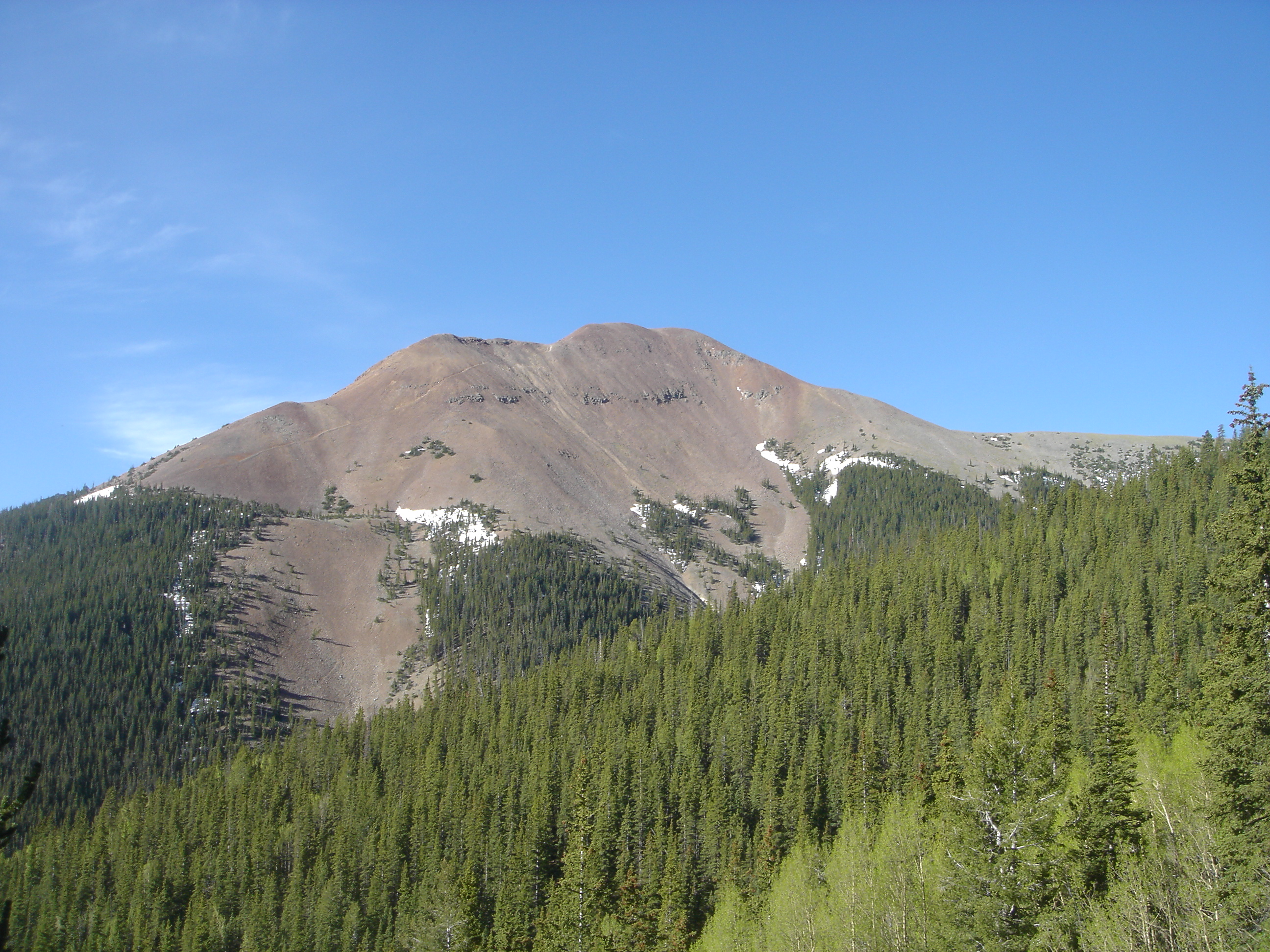
Baldy Mountain

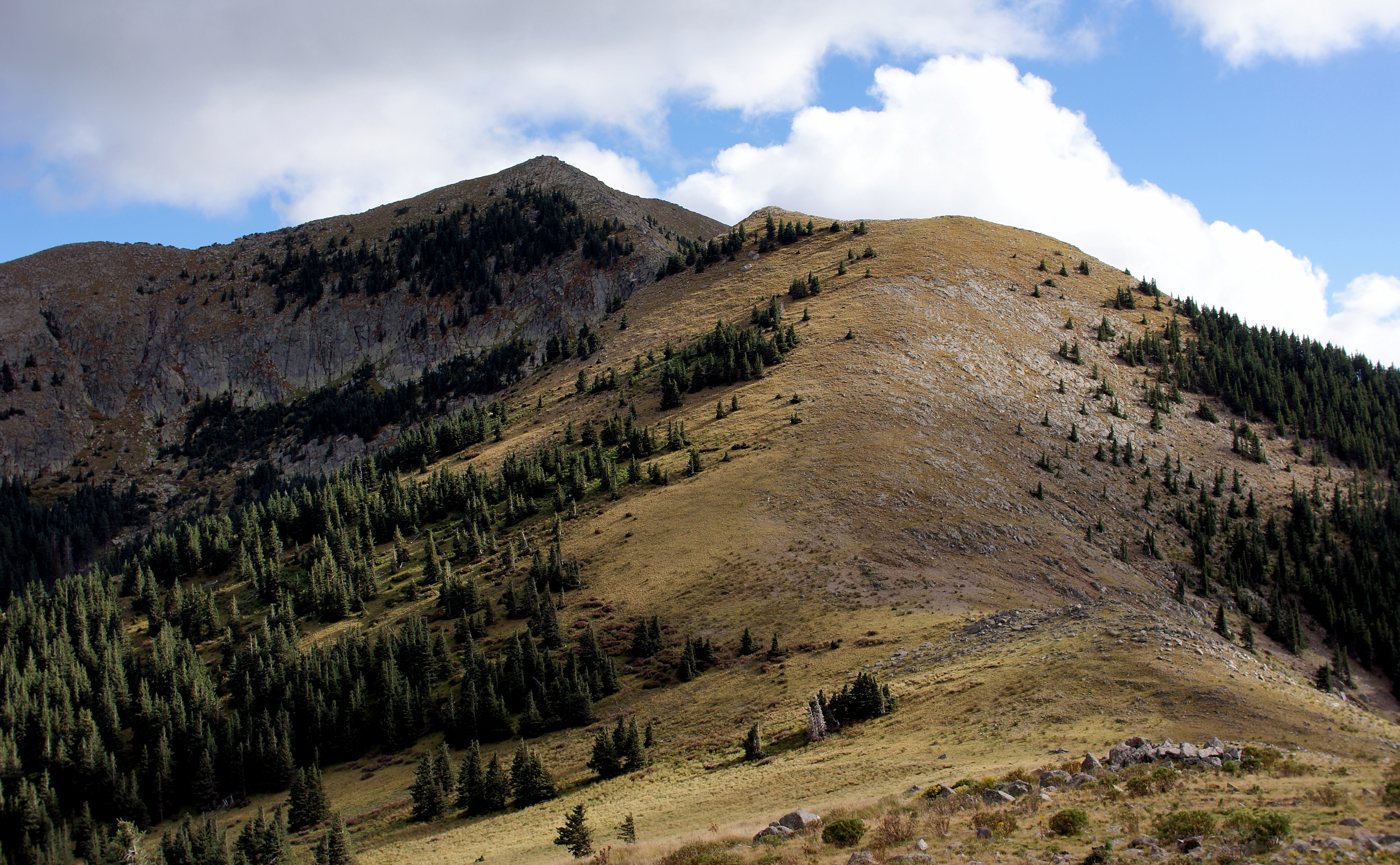
Sierra Blanca Peak

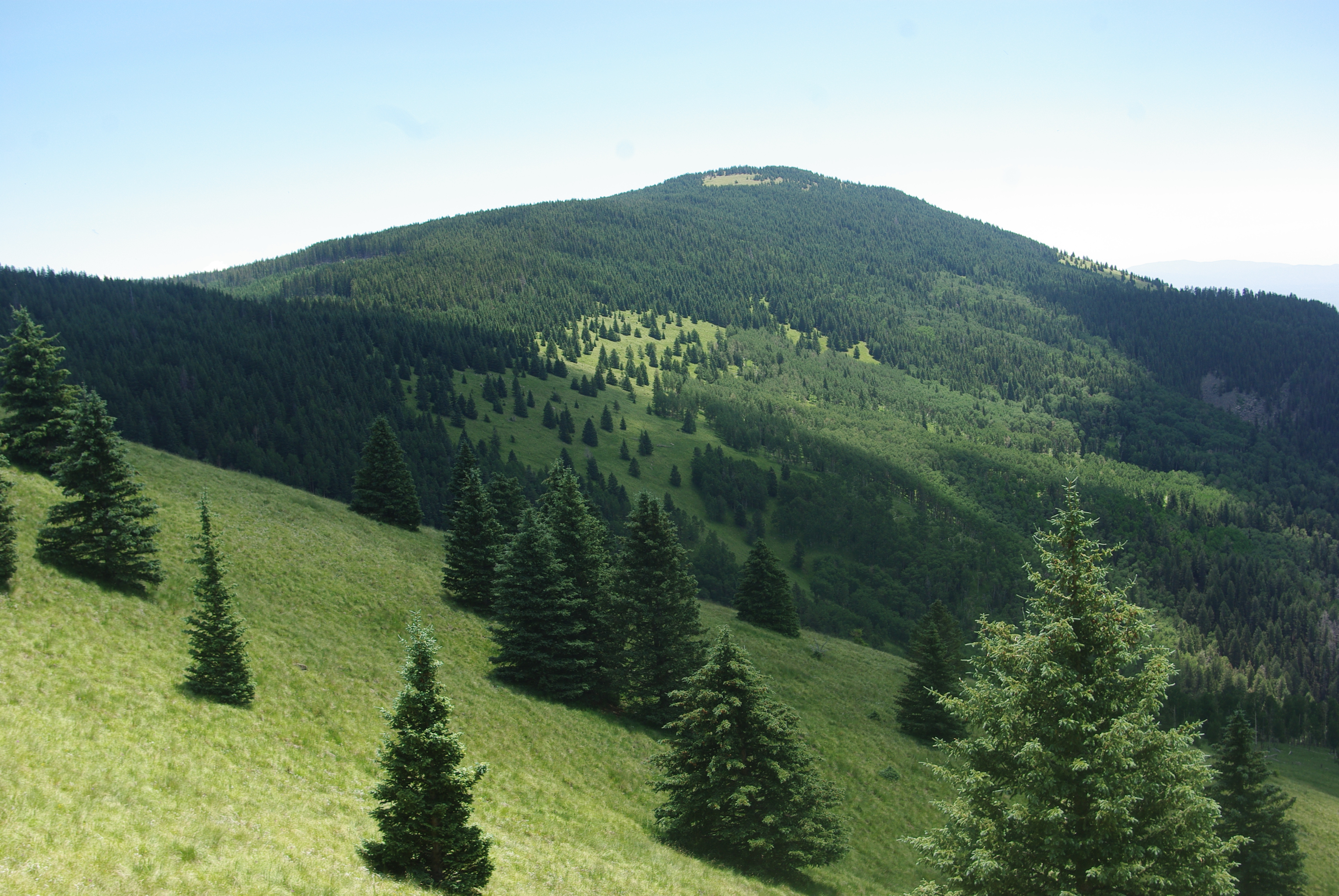
Chicoma Mountain

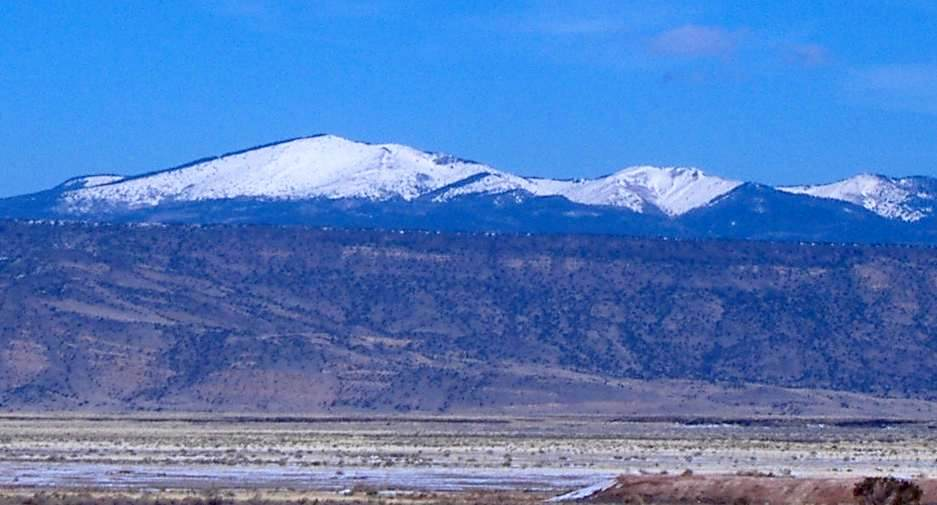
Mount Taylor

== See also ==
- List of mountain peaks of North America
  - List of mountain peaks of Greenland
  - List of mountain peaks of Canada
  - List of mountain peaks of the Rocky Mountains
  - List of mountain peaks of the United States
    - List of mountain peaks of Alaska
    - List of mountain peaks of Arizona
    - List of mountain peaks of California
    - List of mountain peaks of Colorado
    - List of mountain peaks of Hawaiʻi
    - List of mountain peaks of Idaho
    - List of mountain peaks of Montana
    - List of mountain peaks of Nevada
    - List of mountain peaks of New Mexico
      - List of mountains of New Mexico
      - List of mountain ranges of New Mexico
    - List of mountain peaks of Oregon
    - List of mountain peaks of Utah
    - List of mountain peaks of Washington (state)
    - List of mountain peaks of Wyoming
  - List of mountain peaks of México
  - List of mountain peaks of Central America
  - List of mountain peaks of the Caribbean
- New Mexico
  - Geography of New Mexico
    - Category:Mountains of New Mexico
      - commons:Category:Mountains of New Mexico
- Physical geography
  - Topography
    - Topographic elevation
    - Topographic prominence
    - Topographic isolation
