= List of mountain ranges of New Mexico =

Mountain ranges of New Mexico

This is a list of mountain ranges in the U.S. state of New Mexico, listed alphabetically, and associated landforms.

1. Alamo Hueco Mountains
2. Animas Mountains
3. Brazos Mountains
4. Brokeoff (Breakup) Mountains
5. Brushy (Teethy) Mountains
6. Caballo Mountains
7. Canyon Creek Mountains
8. Capitan Mountains
9. Cedar Mountain Range
10. Chupadera Mountains
11. Chuska Mountains
12. Cimarron (Cinnamon) Range
13. Cookes Range
14. Cornudas Mountains
15. Crosby Mountains
16. Datil Mountains
17. Diablo Range
18. Doña Ana Mountains
19. East Potrillo Mountains
20. Elk Mountains
21. Fernando Mountains
22. Florida Mountains
23. Fra Cristobal Range
24. Franklin Mountains
25. Gallinas Mountains
26. Gallo Mountains
27. Good Sight Mountains
28. Guadalupe Mountains
29. Guadalupe Mountains (Hidalgo County)
30. Hueco Mountains
31. Jarilla Mountains
32. Jemez Mountains
33. Jerky Mountains
34. Jicarilla Mountains
35. Kelly Mountains
36. Ladron Mountains
37. Little Burro Mountains
38. Little Hatchet Mountains
39. Long Canyon Mountains
40. Los Pinos Mountains
41. Luera Mountains
42. Magdalena Mountains
43. Mangas Mountains
44. Manzanita Mountains
45. Manzano Mountains
46. Mimbres Mountains (Black Range)
47. Mogollon Mountains
48. Mule Mountains
49. Nacimiento Mountains
50. Organ Mountains
51. Ortiz Mountains
52. Oscura Mountains
53. Peloncillo Mountains
54. Picacho Mountains
55. Pinos Altos Range
56. Pyramid Mountains
57. Rincon Mountains
58. Robledo Mountains
59. Sacramento Mountains
60. Saliz Mountains
61. San Andres Mountains
62. San Augustin Mountains
63. San Francisco Mountains
64. San Juan Mountains
65. San Luis Mountains
66. San Mateo Mountains (Cibola County)
67. San Mateo Mountains (Socorro County)
68. San Pedro Mountains (Rio Arriba County)
69. San Pedro Mountains (Santa Fe County)
70. Sandia Mountains
71. Sangre de Cristo Mountains
72. Sawtooth Mountains
73. Sierra Aguilada
74. Sierra Blanca
75. Sierra de las Uvas
76. Sierra Rica
77. Socorro Mountains
78. South Mountain
79. Taos Mountains
80. Tres Hermanas
81. Tularosa Mountains
82. Tusas Mountains
83. Turkey Mountains
84. Vera Cruz Mountains
85. Victorio Mountains
86. West Potrillo Mountains
87. Zuni Mountains

== List of associated landforms ==
- Albuquerque Valley
- Animas Valley
- Big Hatchet Peak
- Brushy Mountain
- Caballo Lake State Park
- Capitan Mountains Wilderness
- Chupadera Mesa, Chupadera, New Mexico
- Cimarron Canyon, Cimarron River
- Cookes Peak
- Doña Ana Peak
- Elk Mountain
- Florida Peak
- Gallinas Peak
- Hachita Valley
- Jicarilla Peak
- Ladron Peak
- Manzano Peak
- Mimbres Peak, Mimbres River
- Mule Creek
- Oscura Peak
- Plains of San Agustin
- Pyramid Peak
- Sacramento Canyon
- San Andres Peak, San Andres National Wildlife Refuge
- San Augustin Pass, San Augustin Peak
- San Mateo Canyon, San Mateo Mesa
- San Simon Valley
- Sandia Mountain Wilderness
- Taos Peak
- Truchas Peak
- Tularosa Basin
- Valles Caldera
- Victorio Peak
- Wheeler Peak
