= West Potrillo Mountains =

Mountain range in south central Doña Ana County, New Mexico, United States

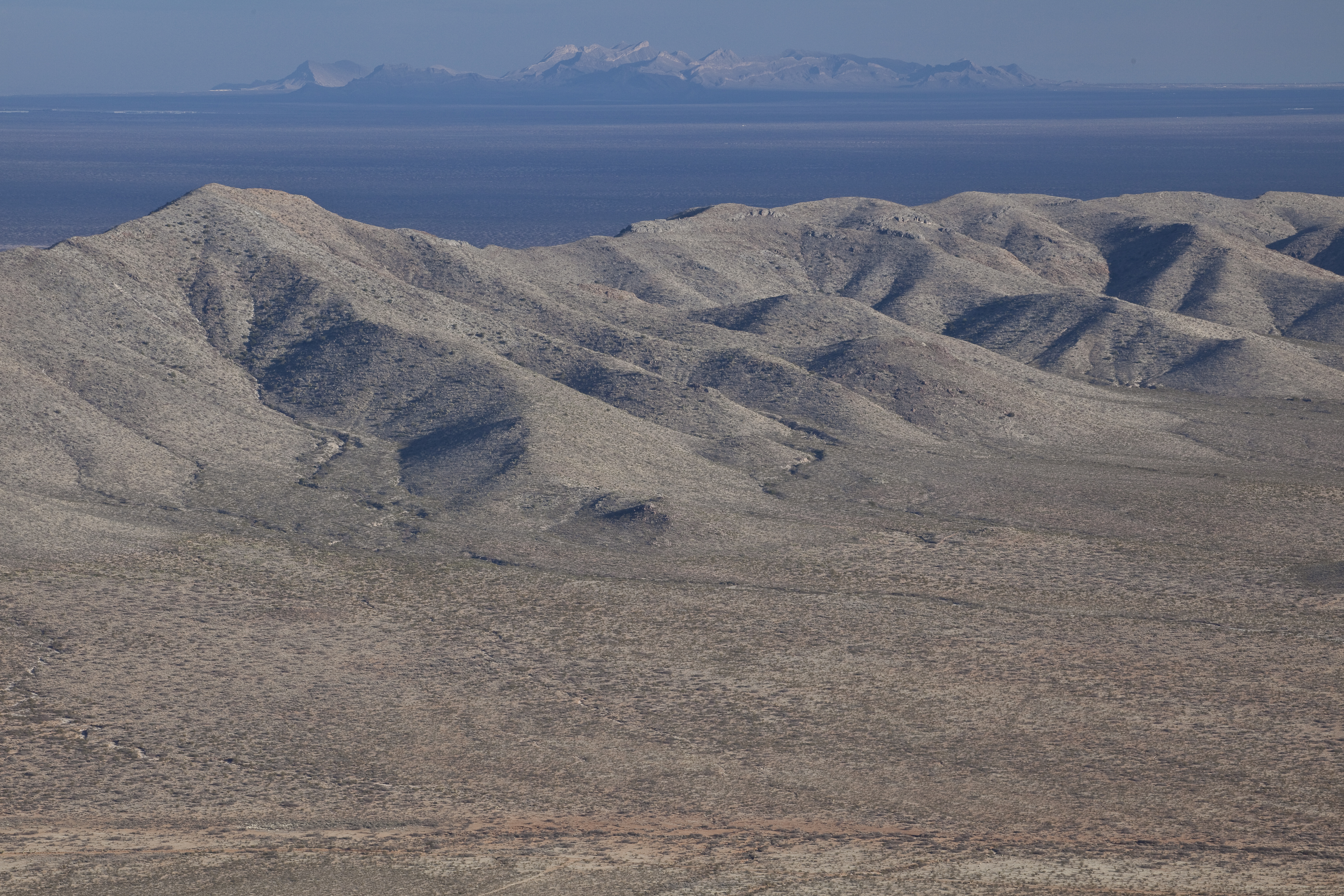

Highest point
- Peak: Cox Peak
- Elevation: 5,957 ft (1,816 m)
- Coordinates: 31°54′51″N 107°4′58″W

Dimensions
- Length: 25 mi (40 km) NNE-SSW

Geography
- Country: United States
- State: New Mexico
- County: Doña Ana
- Range coordinates: 31°52′N 107°0′W
- Borders on: Interstate 10-N; Rio Grande Valley-E; East Potrillo Mountains-S

Geology
- Rock type(s): Maar volcanoes, cinder cones, basalt outflows

The West Potrillo Mountains are a mountain range in south central Doña Ana County, New Mexico, United States. They are located approximately 40 miles (64 km) northwest of El Paso, Texas, 25 miles (40 km) southwest of Las Cruces, New Mexico, and 35 miles (56 km) southeast of Deming, New Mexico Most of the mountains are located on land managed by the Bureau of Land Management as part of the Organ Mountains–Desert Peaks National Monument. Access to the vicinity is through Doña Ana County Road B-4 South from NM 549, which may be accessed from Interstate 10 Exit 116.

== Geology ==
The West Potrillo Mountains occupy the western part of the Potrillo volcanic field, an area of olivine basalts covering approximately 400 square miles (1,000 km^{2}). In addition to the West Potrillo Mountains, the Potrillo Volcanic Field includes Aden Crater, Kilbourne Hole, and the Santo Tomas / Black Mountain basalts near La Mesa, New Mexico. The field includes hundreds of volcanic features, including maars, spatter cones, a shield volcano, and cinder cones. The most common peaks in the West Potrillos are cinder cones with a height of between 93–435 feet (28–133 m). They are relatively undissected by erosion, and have estimated ages of 262 to 916 thousand years. Some features (like Aden Crater) believed to be as young as twenty thousand years old. Over 150 cinder cones and two maars have been mapped in the West Potrillo Mountains.

The mountains sit on a horst (an elevated block of the Earth's crust), in contrast with nearby Aden Crater, which sits in a graben (a block of the Earth's crust that has subsided.) The surface of the horst rises 120 to 240 meters (390 to 790 ft) above the surrounding terrain. The lava erupted in this area was enriched in alkali metals (sodium and potassium) and ranged in composition from basanite through alkali basalt to trachybasalt.

The rocks in the surrounding area are extremely diverse, with exposed (non-volcanic) layers ranging in age from Paleozoic to Holocene. Marine deposits (carbonates) were deposited during repeated advances of late Paleozoic and early Mesozoic seas. Folding and faulting of Lower Cretaceous layers occurred during the Laramide disturbance in the nearby East Potrillo Mountains. These Mesozoic beds are now exposed in the East Potrillo Mountains and to the west of the West Potrillo Mountains at Eagle Nest (31.920°N 107.343°W). The area has been above sea level since the Cretaceous period. In the early to middle Tertiary, the Riley Cox andesitic pluton was emplaced. This activity also seems to be associated with the intrusion of andesitic and quartz latite dikes in the East Potrillo range. During the middle Tertiary, high angle faulting and uplifting occurred in the East Potrillo range and began to form intermontane basins. In the middle to late Quaternary, alkali olivine basalt was extruded from fissures in the Fitzgerald, Robledo, and Aden faults. During the late Pleistocene to Holocene, movement occurred along the Fitzgerald and Robledo faults. Holocene deposits are mostly fine blown sand.

== Climate ==
The West Potrillo Mountains lie within the Chihuahuan Desert. The climate is arid and continental. Weather records in nearby El Paso, Texas show that the average daily maximum temperature over the course of the year is 77.3 degrees Fahrenheit, with an average daily minimum of 50.1 degrees Fahrenheit. Average monthly maximum temperatures range from 96 degrees in June, to 58 degrees in January. Average monthly minimum temperatures range from 30 degrees in January to 70 degrees in July. Average annual precipitation in El Paso is 8.81 inches, with monthly averages ranging from 0.2 inches in April to 1.7 in September. Over half of the annual precipitation falls in the form of summer rains between June and September, although some snow can be expected in the winter.

== Ecology ==
The plant communities found in the West Potrillos can be generally characterized as Chihuahuan desert scrublands, creosotebush desert, and desert grasslands. The dominant shrub species include creosote bush (Larrea tridentata), honey mesquite (Prosopis glandulosa), soaptree yucca (Yucca elata), and fourwing saltbush (Atriplex canescens). Common grasses include black grama (Bouteloua eriopoda), blue grama (Bouteloua gracilis), sideoats grama (Bouteloua curtipendula), bush muhly (Muhlenbergia porteri), and alkali sacaton (Sporobolus airoides).

Common mammals include mule deer (Odocoileus hemionus), coyotes (Canis latrans), black-tailed jackrabbit (Lepus californicus), desert cottontail (Sylvilagus auduboni), white-throated woodrat (Neotoma albigula), kangaroo rats (Dipodomys merriami and Dipodomys spectabilis), and cactus mouse (Peromyscus eremicus).

Common birds include golden eagles (Aquila chrysaetos), Swainson's hawk (Buteo swainsoni), northern harrier (Circus cyaneus), burrowing owl (Athene cunicularia), greater roadrunner (Geococcyx californianus), quail (Callipepla gambelii and Callipepla squamata), horned lark (Eremophila alpestris), western meadowlark (Sturnella neglecta), doves (Zenaida macroura and Zenaida asiatica), and black-throated sparrow (Amphispiza bilineata).

Common reptiles include collared lizards (Crotaphytus collaris), roundtail horned lizard (Phrynosoma modestum), striped whipsnake (Masticophis taeniatus), and western diamondback rattlesnake (Crotalus atrox).

Common amphibians include New Mexico spadefoot toad (Spea multiplicata), Great Plains toad (Bufo cognatus), green toad (Bufo debilis), and red-spotted toad (Bufo punctatus).

== Human use ==
Archeological studies indicate that there have been at least three distinct periods of prehistoric human usage of the West Potrillos. The Paleo-Indian period began in about 9,500 BCE and ended in about 6,000 BCE. This period is itself divided into three traditions: Clovis, Folsom, and Plano. These people were thought to have been mobile big game hunters. Beginning in about 6000 BCE, members of the Desert Archaic cultures moved into the area and remained until about 100 ACE. These people were hunters and gatherers, who appear to have begun plant cultivation. From about 200 ACE to about 1450 ACE, the Mogollon culture became predominant. During this period, agriculture became predominant and pottery was introduced. People aggregated into villages and built above-ground residences. There was evidence of trade with other areas. In about 1540, it appears that the ancestors of the Apaches moved into the area and displaced the earlier residents. Apache resistance discouraged use of the area by Spanish Colonial or Mexican settlers. Occupation of the area by the Chiricahua Apache continued until about 1890.

== Points of interest ==
Established in 2019 by the U.S. Congress, the Potrillo Mountains Wilderness, at 105,085 acres, is the 4th largest in New Mexico. High points in the range include Cox Peak (5,957'), Mt. Riley (5,909'), Potrillo Peak (), and Guzman Lookout Mountain (). The area is used for ranching, bird hunting, camping, hiking, and foot launched aviation (paragliding and hang gliding). Many campers and hikers, however, look elsewhere because of the absence of trails and dependable water. This wilderness area is managed by the Bureau of Land Management.

In 1928, a fossilized ground sloth (Nothrotheriops shastensis) was found in a fumarole in Aden Crater. Its age was estimated to be 11,000 years. It was later acquired by the Peabody Museum of Natural History at Yale University.
