= Eupithecia nonanticaria =

Scientific classification
- Domain: Eukaryota
- Kingdom: Animalia
- Phylum: Arthropoda
- Class: Insecta
- Order: Lepidoptera
- Family: Geometridae
- Genus: Eupithecia
- Species: E. nonanticaria

Binomial name
- Eupithecia nonanticaria Ferris, 2007

Species of moth

Eupithecia nonanticaria is a moth in the family Geometridae first described by Clifford D. Ferris in 2007. It is found in New Mexico (the Pinos Altos Range and the Black Range), Arizona (the Chiricahua Mountains) and Chihuahua in Mexico. The habitat consists of mixed coniferous forests at elevations above 1,760 meters.

The length of the forewings is 9.5–11 mm for males and 9–11 mm for females. Adults are on wing from late July to mid August.
