= East Potrillo Mountains =

Mountain range in New Mexico, United States

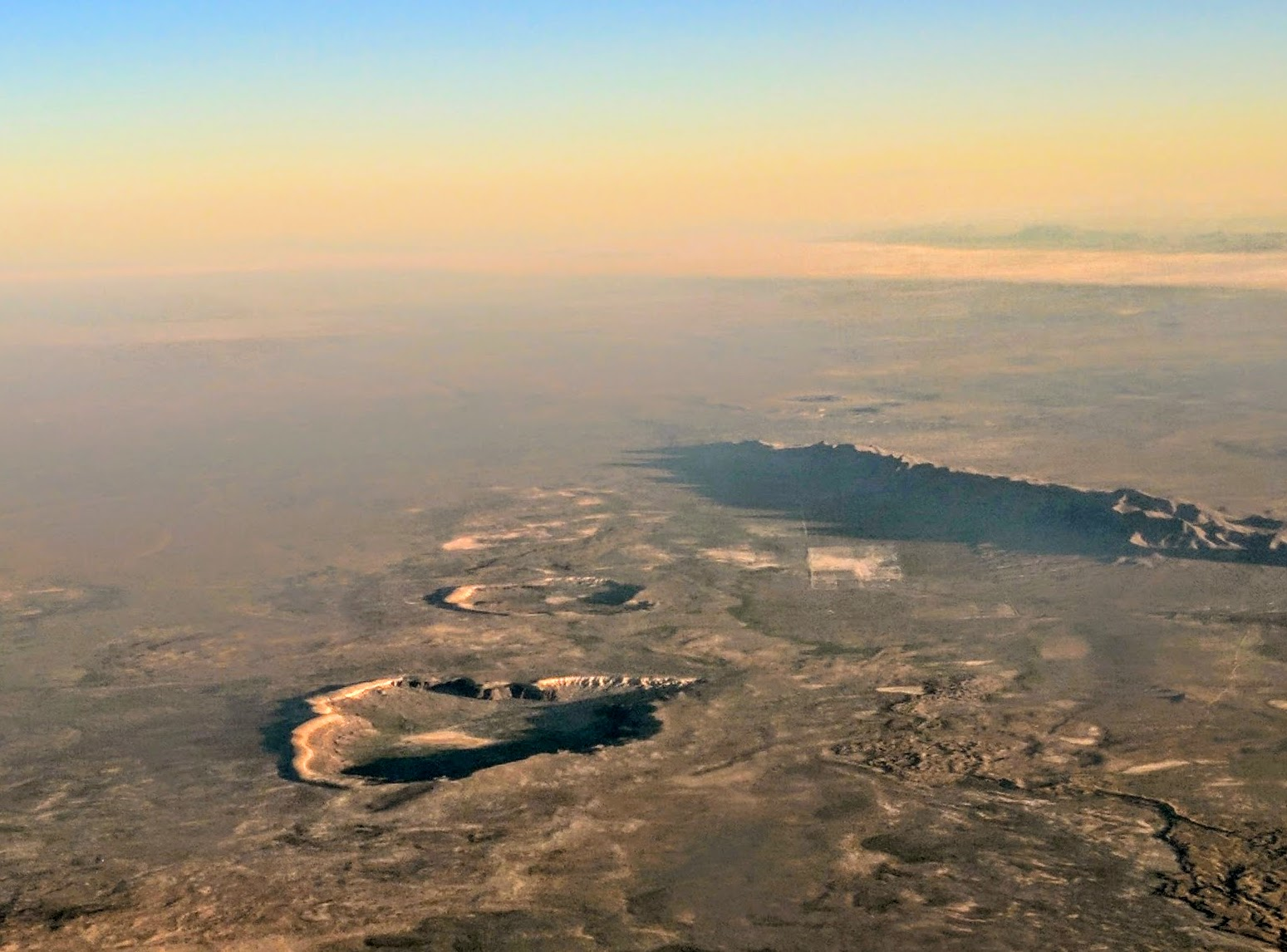
- Kilbourne and Hunts Holes and East Potrillo Mountains

Highest point
- Peak: Unnamed point on ridge
- Elevation: 5,344 ft (1,629 m)
- Coordinates: 31°53.6220′N 107°1.4697′W

Dimensions
- Length: 10 mi (16 km) NNW-SSE
- Width: 1–2 mi (1.6–3.2 km) WSW-ENE

Geography
- Location within New Mexico
- Country: United States
- State: New Mexico
- County: Doña Ana
- Range coordinates: 31°52′36″N 107°0′43″W
- Borders on: West Potrillo Mountains-W; Rio Grande Valley (New Mexico)-E; Cox Peak, Mt. Riley, Potrillo volcanic field-N

Geology
- Rock type(s): Uplifted fault block, with Cretaceous limestone and siltstones overlaying Permian limestones

The East Potrillo Mountains are a mountain range in south central Doña Ana County, New Mexico. They are located approximately 25 miles (40 km) west of El Paso, Texas, 30 miles (48 km) southwest of Las Cruces, New Mexico, and 30 miles east of Columbus, New Mexico. The southern tip of the range is less than 5 miles (8.0 km) from the Mexican border. The mountains and most of the surrounding acreage are located on land owned by the Bureau of Land Management. Access to the general vicinity is through New Mexico State Road 9, and several unpaved county roads. They are considered an example of sky islands.

== Geology ==
The East Potrillos can be generally described as an uplifted west-tilted fault-block. The mountains are located near the western margin of the Rio Grande Rift, a major structure that stretches from the vicinity of Leadville, Colorado, through central New Mexico, and into the Mexican state of Chihuahua. In southern New Mexico, several large basins are associated with the rift, including the Mimbres basin to the west of the Potrillos, and the Mesilla basin to the east. A large intra-rift horst lies between those two basins, and the range is situated on the horst. The uplifting of the Potrillos, together with the subsidence of nearby grabens, occurred in the late Tertiary. The eastern boundary of the horst is the active Robledo fault, which has created a scarp on the eastern side of the range.

The basal rocks in the range are sedimentary, and consist of limestone, dolomites, and silty beds of Middle Permian age. The thickness of these beds is approximately 950 feet (290 m). Disconformably above these beds are layers of Lower Cretaceous limestone, siltstone, sandstone, and conglomerate. These rocks are about 1,800 feet (550 m) in thickness on the northern part of the range, but thin to the south. These Cretaceous rocks are correlative with the Hell-to-Finish Formation (Aptian age) and the U-Bar Formation (late Aptian to middle Albian) found in other parts of southwestern New Mexico. Quaternary deposits include alluvial fans and wind-blown sands.

== Climate ==
The East Potrillo Mountains lie within the Chihuahuan Desert. The climate is arid and continental. Weather records in nearby El Paso, Texas show that the average daily maximum temperature over the course of the year is 77.3 degrees Fahrenheit, with an average daily minimum of 50.1 degrees Fahrenheit. Average monthly maximum temperatures range from 96 degrees in June, to 58 degrees in January. Average monthly minimum temperatures range from 30 degrees in January to 70 degrees in July. Average annual precipitation in El Paso is 8.81 inches, with monthly averages ranging from .2 inches in April to 1.7 in September. Over half of the annual precipitation falls in the form of summer rains between June and September, although some snow can be expected in the winter.

== Ecology ==
The East Potrillo Mountains impose extreme demands on ecological communities. Water management is a critical factor for residents. No perennial streams originate in the range, and none flow nearby. There is very little permanent water in the area, other than stock tanks and surface impoundments. Precipitation quickly evaporates, runs off, or soaks into the ground, leaving little for plants or animals. Slopes that face south or west tend to have both a higher solar exposure and a higher rate of water evaporation than those facing north and east. This can result in great species variation between communities that happen to be located on slopes with different aspects.

Soils on the mountains are generally rocky and thin. On the flats below, soils are somewhat deeper, and frequently consist of windblown dunes.

Plant communities can be generally characterized as Chihuahuan desert scrublands, creosotebush desert, and desert grasslands. Dominant shrub species include creosote bush (Larrea tridentata), honey mesquite (Prosopis glandulosa), soaptree yucca (Yucca elata), and four winged saltbush (Atriplex canescens). Common grasses include black grama (Bouteloua eriopoda), blue grama (Bouteloua gracilis), sideoats grama (Bouteloua curtipendula), and alkali sacaton (Sporobolus airoides).

Common animals/ mammals include mule deer (Odocoileus hemionus), coyotes (Canis latrans), Black-tailed jackrabbit (Lepus californicus), desert cottontail, (Sylvilagus auduboni) and kangaroo rats (Dipodomys merriami and Dipodomys spectabilis). Common birds include golden eagles (Aquila chrysaetos), Swainson's hawk (Buteo swainsoni), Northern harrier (Circus cyaneus), burrowing owl (Athene cunicularia), roadrunner (Geococcyx californianus), quail (Callipepla gambelii and Callipepla squamata), doves (Zenaida macroura and Zenaida asiatica). Common reptiles include Collared lizards (Crotaphytus collaris), Roundtail Horned Lizard (Phrynosoma modestum), Striped whipsnake (Masticophis taeniatus), and Western diamondback rattlesnake (Crotalus atrox). Common amphibians include New Mexico Spadefoot Toad (Spea multiplicata), Great Plains Toad (Bufo cognatus), Green Toad (Bufo debilis), and Red-spotted Toad (Bufo punctatus)

== Items of interest ==
Although they are relatively close to two large cities, the East Potrillo Mountains receive few visitors. This is due to the rugged topography, and the lack of water or shade. The range is long and narrow, with an orientation trending NNW to SSE. The maximum elevation of the range is approximately 5,300 feet, which provides a relief of nearly 1,000 feet (300 m) above the flats to the east. Mount Riley and Cox Peak draw hikers because of their excellent views of the East Potrillo Mountains, and the nearby West Potrillo Mountains. Although these peaks are located very close to the main spine of the East Potrillo Mountains, they are igneous, and more closely related geologically to the West Potrillo Mountains.

Of particular interest to visitors are a series of nearby maare, or phreatomagmatic craters, which are located approximately 5–10 miles to the north and east of the main spine of the range. The craters include Kilbourne Hole, Hunt's Hole, and Phillips Hole. These formations are estimated to have an age of between 24,000 and 50,000 mya. They are associated with the Potrillo volcanic field. That field includes the West Potrillo Mountains and the Aden lava flows to the north and west.

The name Potrillo means "colt" in Spanish. The Bureau of Land management considered, but rejected Wilderness Study Area status for a 26,300 acre unit that includes the range. A larger area (159, 972 acres) that includes the nearby West Potrillo Mountains has been designated as a Wilderness Study Area. Full wilderness status for this area was proposed, but defeated in the lame duck Congressional session of 2010. This was largely due to a desire for a "buffer" zone along the border and a perception that wilderness status would inhibit the detection of illegal immigrants.
