= Capitan Gap Fire =

Wildfire in New Mexico, United States

Coordinates: 33.63°N 105.46°W

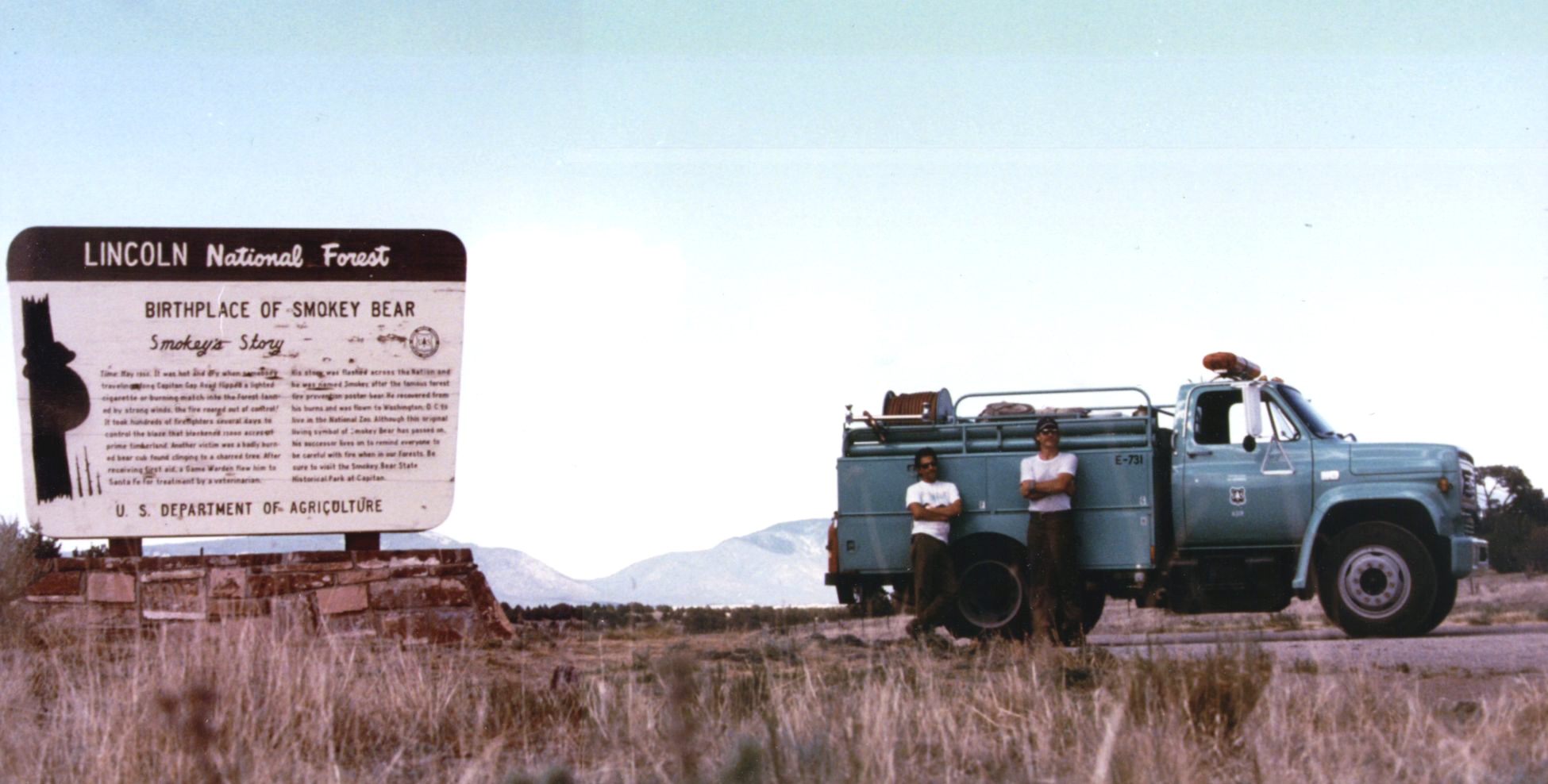
Smokey Bear Vista Point in 1990, with Capitan Gap in the distance between the sign and Tahoe National Forest Fire Engine 731

The Capitan Gap Fire was a 17,000 acres (69 km^{2}) human-caused forest fire that broke out in the Capitan Mountains range within Lincoln National Forest, in Lincoln County, eastern New Mexico in 1950, beginning on May 4. It was named for Capitan Gap in the mountain range.

While a 24-man firefighting crew desperately dug firebreaks, the wind shifted, and the fire jumped the line. The men buried themselves in the earth of a recent landslide, and survived the fire.

== Smokey Bear ==
During the blaze, a bear cub which the men had previously seen ducking in and out of the forest survived the fire by climbing a tree and hanging onto the windward side, suffering only singes and other survivable injuries. He was rescued by the firefighters and named Hotfoot, before filling the role of Smokey Bear.

Smokey Bear Vista Point overlooks some of the wildfire's site in Lincoln National Forest.

== See also ==
- Wildfires in New Mexico
