= Aldo Leopold Wilderness =

Protected wilderness area in New Mexico, United States

- IUCN category Ib (wilderness area)
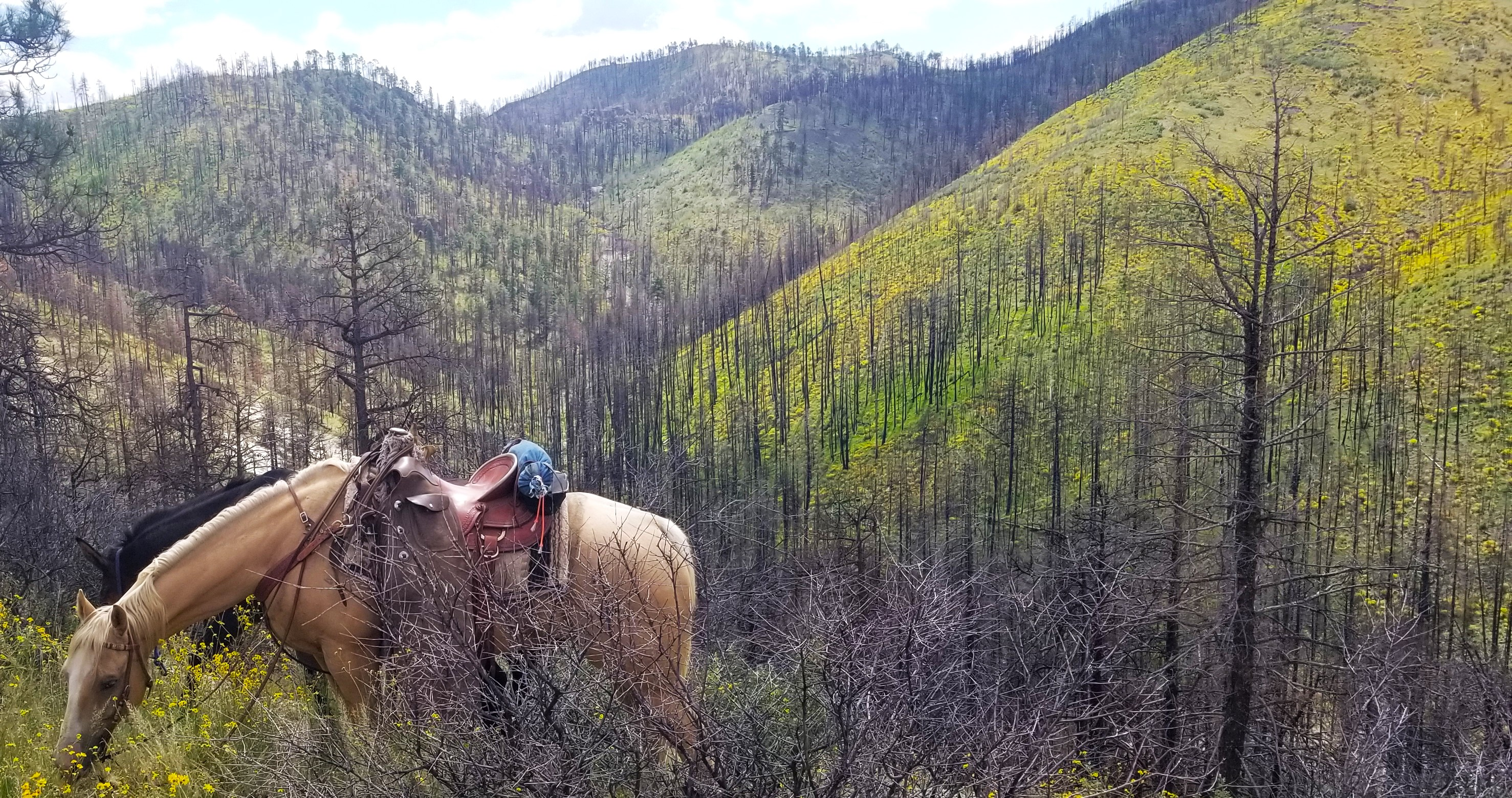

- Location within the United States
- Location: Sierra / Grant / Catron counties, New Mexico, United States
- Nearest city: Silver City, New Mexico
- Coordinates: 33°06′25″N 107°51′18″W
- Area: 202,016 acres (81,753 ha)
- Established: 1980
- Governing body: U.S. Forest Service

Aldo Leopold Wilderness, along with Gila Wilderness and Blue Range Wilderness, is part of New Mexico's Gila National Forest. It became part of the National Wilderness Preservation System in 1980 by an act of the United States Congress and has a total of 202,016 acres (81,753 ha) (316 sq. mi.). The wilderness area lies along the crest of the Black Range.

The Continental Divide of the Americas and the Continental Divide Trail traverse part of the wilderness.

== History ==
The area within the Aldo Leopold Wilderness was formerly part of the Gila Wilderness, the world's first wilderness area, established in 1924. Later, the Gila was reduced in size and this area became the Black Range Primitive Area. In 1980, the Aldo Leopold Wilderness was created, named after Aldo Leopold, a pioneering environmentalist.

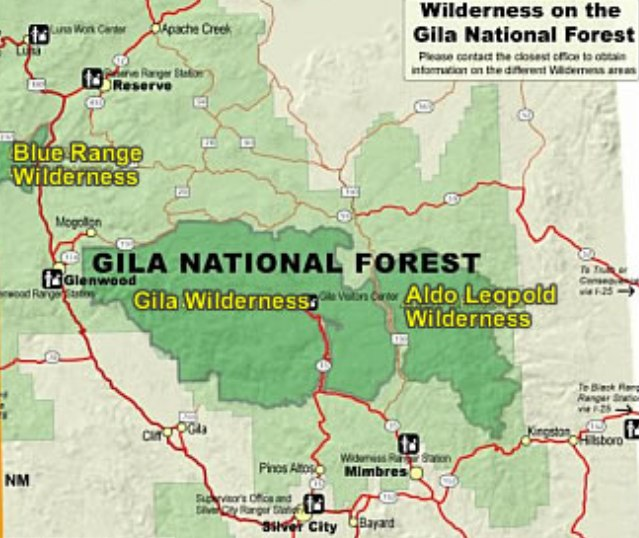
A map of the Wilderness Areas in Gila National Forest, including Aldo Leopold

On September 18, 1879, the Apache war chief Victorio and his warriors ambushed 100 Buffalo soldiers (African-Americans) of the 9th Cavalry and Navajo scouts on the eastern edge of the Black Range and the Wilderness near Las Animas Creek. The Apaches killed about 10 of the Buffalo soldiers and Navajo scouts. The cavalry was able to withdraw after dark, leaving much of its gear to be captured by Apaches. The canyon where the battle took place is called "Massacre Canyon" and a nearby flat area is called Victorio Park.

== Topography, flora, and fauna ==
The Aldo Leopold Wilderness area stretches north-south along the crest of the Black Range for about 30 miles (48 km) and has a maximum width of about 15 miles (24 km). The elevation of the crest ranges from 8,600 to 10,165 feet (2,621 to 3,098 m) at McKnight Mountain, the highest point in the wilderness area. The crest of the range overlooks a series of east-west trending steep and narrow stream valleys, one thousand or more feet deep. The lowest elevation in the wilderness is about 6,000 feet (1,830 m). Vegetation in the Aldo Leopold consists of a spruce-fir and quaking aspen forest above 9,000 feet (2,740 m), a ponderosa pine forest between 6,500 and 9,000 feet (2,000 and 2,700 m) and a pinyon-juniper woodland and desert vegetation below 6,500 feet and on dry southern slopes. Hardwood forests, especially cottonwood, line many of the larger streams.

The wilderness area has fauna typical of the American Southwest: mule deer, elk, spotted owl, gray fox, wild turkey, bobcat, peccary, black bear and cougar. Of note is the effort to reintroduce the Mexican wolf to the region. The native Gila trout has been brought back from the verge of extinction and now exists in small populations in Diamond Creek, South Diamond Creek and Black Canyon on the west side of the Black Range. A population of Rio Grande cutthroat trout survives in Holden Prong of Las Animas Creek on the east side of the Black Range. The Mimbres River has its headwaters in the Wilderness.

Due to the prevalence of forest fires, brushy areas, grassland, and recently burned forests are also common. In 2013, the Silver Fire destroyed or damaged more than 56,000 acres (23,000 ha) of forest, most of it in the Wilderness, especially at higher elevations.

== Recreation ==
Aldo Leopold is rugged and remote and is often considered New Mexico's "wildest wilderness", probably seeing fewer human visitors in 2011 than it did 100 years ago. Hiking and backpacking are the major recreational activities, but scarcity of water inhibits many potential visitors. Most streams and springs are seasonal and unreliable. More than 200 miles of trails crisscross the wilderness, including about 30 miles of the Continental Divide Trail. Most trails are faint and little used and navigation can be a problem. Scenery and solitude are the main attractions of the Aldo Leopold Wilderness. Hunting is permitted.

The best known and most accessible trail into the wilderness leads from Highway 152 at 8,228-foot (2,508 m) Emory Pass and goes five miles north to Hillsboro Peak which reaches an elevation of 10,011 feet (3,051 m). This trail continues to follow the entire north-south length of the mountains along the central ridge, a distance of 51.4 miles (83 km) from Emory Pass to Caledonia trail head on New Mexico 226. There are also a number of campgrounds, some with hiking trails, along NM 152 as it goes through Iron Canyon on the west side of the Black Range.

The Aldo Leopold is separated from the larger Gila Wilderness Area only by a gravel road and a narrow corridor of private property.

== See also ==
- Aldo Leopold
- List of U.S. Wilderness Areas
- Wilderness Act
