= Little Costilla Peak =

Mountain summit in the Culebra Range of New Mexico

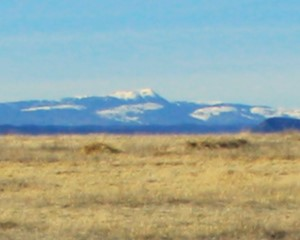
- Little Costilla Peak, Culebra Range, New Mexico

Highest point
- Elevation: 12,589 ft (3,837 m); NAVD88
- Prominence: 2,444 ft (745 m)
- Isolation: 7.49 mi (12.05 km) to Big Costilla Peak
- Listing: Highest major summits of New Mexico 6th; Most prominent summits of New Mexico 28th; New Mexico county high points 5th
- Coordinates: 36.8334591°N 105.2227735°W

Geography
- Location within New Mexico
- Location: High Point of Colfax County
- Country: United States
- State: New Mexico
- Counties: Colfax; Taos
- National Forest: Carson National Forest
- Parent range: Culebra Range of the Southern Rocky Mountains
- Topo map(s): USGS 7.5' topographic map Ash Mountain, New Mexico

Little Costilla Peak is a 12,589-foot (3,837 m) mountain summit of the Culebra Range in the US State of New Mexico. Little Costilla Peak is located on the hydrological divide between Colfax County and Taos County in Carson National Forest 13.3 miles (21.4 km) northeast of Red River, New Mexico. Little Costilla Peak is the highest point in Colfax County, New Mexico.

== Mountain ==
As the sixth highest major summit of New Mexico, Little Costilla Peak is a popular hiking destination. Somewhat higher but less prominent, Big Costilla Peak is located 7.5 miles (12.1 km) to the northwest.

== Climate ==
Climate data for Little Costilla Peak 36.8335 N, 105.2226 W, Elevation: 12,172 ft (3,710 m) (1991–2020 normals)
Month	Jan	Feb	Mar	Apr	May	Jun	Jul	Aug	Sep	Oct	Nov	Dec	Year
Mean daily maximum °F (°C)	27.5 (−2.5)	28.2 (−2.1)	33.9 (1.1)	39.2 (4.0)	47.9 (8.8)	59.2 (15.1)	62.7 (17.1)	60.8 (16.0)	55.2 (12.9)	45.3 (7.4)	34.8 (1.6)	27.5 (−2.5)	43.5 (6.4)
Daily mean °F (°C)	17.0 (−8.3)	17.3 (−8.2)	22.4 (−5.3)	27.5 (−2.5)	36.0 (2.2)	46.2 (7.9)	50.3 (10.2)	48.9 (9.4)	43.5 (6.4)	34.2 (1.2)	24.6 (−4.1)	17.4 (−8.1)	32.1 (0.1)
Mean daily minimum °F (°C)	6.6 (−14.1)	6.5 (−14.2)	10.9 (−11.7)	15.7 (−9.1)	24.2 (−4.3)	33.3 (0.7)	37.9 (3.3)	37.1 (2.8)	31.8 (−0.1)	23.1 (−4.9)	14.4 (−9.8)	7.3 (−13.7)	20.7 (−6.3)
Average precipitation inches (mm)	1.95 (50)	2.37 (60)	3.14 (80)	3.14 (80)	2.06 (52)	1.43 (36)	3.38 (86)	3.61 (92)	2.16 (55)	1.92 (49)	2.32 (59)	2.34 (59)	29.82 (758)
Source: PRISM Climate Group

== See also ==
- New Mexico
  - Geography of New Mexico
    - List of mountain peaks of New Mexico
      - Category:Mountains of New Mexico
