= Harry Pye (prospector) =

Harry Pye (died 1879) was a prospector and sometime mule skinner in New Mexico Territory who discovered silver chloride in the Black Range in 1879 initiating a multimillion-dollar silver rush.

Born in England, he first went to Australia where he was unsuccessful, then he came to the American Southwest. Pye was working as a teamster hauling goods for the U.S. Army when he recognized the greyish mineral weathering out of the rock in a remote canyon as silver chloride or chlorargyrite. He finished his contract, filed a claim and started mining, only to be killed a few months later by the Mimbres Apache. But his mine continued under new management and the town of Chloride, New Mexico was founded in the canyon.

== Effects ==
Pye's claim, and the success of his mine set off a silver rush with hundreds of silver mines being opened in the Black Range. Among them was the discovery of the Bridal Chamber in 1882, the richest native silver deposit ever found.
