= Laughlin Peak =

Mountain in New Mexico, United States

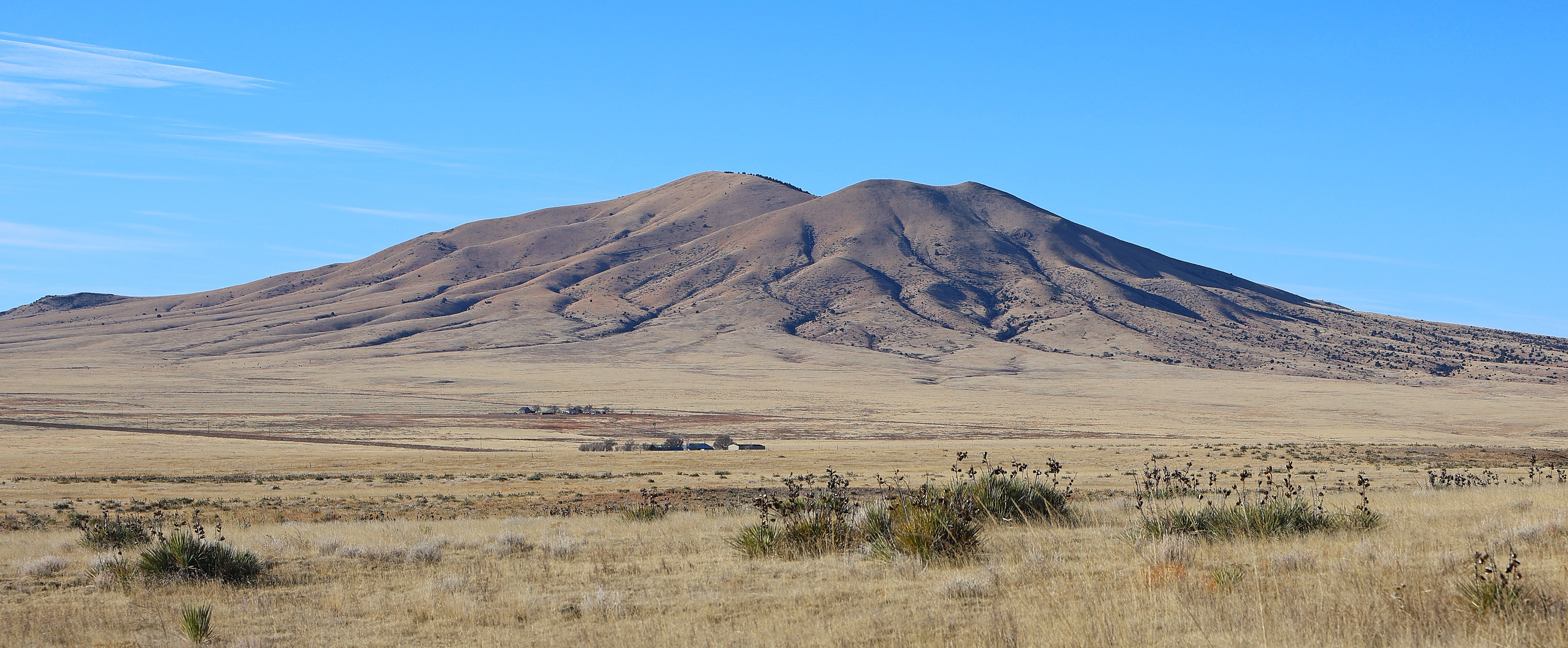
- Northeast aspect

Highest point
- Elevation: 8,819 ft (2,688 m)
- Prominence: 1,830 ft (558 m)
- Parent peak: Fishers Peak
- Isolation: 28.85 mi (46.43 km)
- Coordinates: 36°37′31″N 104°11′09″W

Geography
- Location within New Mexico Location within the United States
- Interactive map of Laughlin Peak
- Country: United States
- State: New Mexico
- County: Colfax
- Parent range: High Plains; Raton Mesas
- Topo map: USGS Mesa Larga

Geology
- Rock age: Late Miocene
- Mountain type: Lava dome
- Rock type: Rhyodacite
- Volcanic zone: Raton-Clayton volcanic field

Climbing
- Easiest route: class 1

Laughlin Peak is a mountain in Colfax County, New Mexico, United States.

== Description ==
Laughlin Peak, also known as "Baldy", is an 8,819-foot-elevation (2,688-meter) volcanic summit located 22 miles (35 km) southeast of Raton, New Mexico. Topographic relief is significant as the summit rises over 1,200 feet (366 meters) above the surrounding terrain in one mile (1.6 km), and it can be seen from Highway 193. Precipitation runoff from the mountain drains into the Arkansas River watershed. The landform's toponym has been officially adopted by the United States Board on Geographic Names, and has been in use since 1891 when Henry Gannett published it in A Dictionary of Altitudes in the United States following the Wheeler Survey. The mountain's namesake is unknown. The nearest higher neighbor is Bartlett Mesa, 28.6 miles (46.0 km) to the north-northwest.

== Geology ==
Laughlin Peak is an extinct lava dome composed of 6.9 ± 0.80 Ma igneous rock which intruded Cretaceous sedimentary rock. The sedimentary rock has since eroded away, exposing deep gullies carved into the soft pyroclastic and lahar deposits. Laughlin Peak erupted during what is known as the Raton phase of eruptions at the Raton-Clayton volcanic field.

== Climate ==
According to the Köppen climate classification system, Laughlin Peak is located in a cool semiarid climate zone (Köppen BSk). The summers are hot during the day, but the high altitude and low humidity mean that nights remain distinctly cool. Most rain falls in the summer from afternoon thunderstorms, and winter snow is common and sometimes heavy.

== See also ==
- List of mountain peaks of New Mexico
