= Luera Mountains =

Mountain range in New Mexico, United States

- Location within New Mexico

Highest point
- Peak: Luera Peak, Luera Mountains
- Elevation: 9,420 ft (2,870 m)
- Coordinates: 33°49′35″N 107°52′39″W

Dimensions
- Length: 15 mi (24 km) (NNW-SSE)
- Width: 15 mi (24 km) (circular)

Geography
- Country: United States
- State: New Mexico
- Region: Continental Divide of the Americas
- District: Catron County NM
- Settlements: Datil, NM and Old Horse Springs, NM
- Range coordinates: 33°49′35″N 107°52′39″W
- Borders on: Plains of San Agustin and Black Range

The Luera Mountains are a 15 mi (24 km) long, mountain range in southeast Catron County, New Mexico, USA in the central-southeast of the Plains of San Agustin. The range abuts the northwest end of the north-south extensive Black Range where the Continental Divide of the Americas traverses the Black Range's ridgeline.

The Continental Divide traverses the southern foothills of the Luera Mountains from west-to-east then turns south into the Black Range. The Continental Divide National Scenic Trail is further south of the water divide in the Luera's, then meets the Continental Divide in the Black Range.

== Description ==
The Luera Mountains are an approximately 15 mi circular range, with Luera Peak in the center north; a small ridgeline goes southeast from the peak with an adjacent creek and canyon. The Luera Mountains are mostly surrounded by the Plains of San Agustin. The linear main-trending line of the plains lies to the west, northwest and northeast, with State Road 12 traversing the north side of the plains. To the southeast of the Luera Mountains between the northwest perimeter of the Black Range, New Mexico State Road 163 crosses the Continental Divide and the National Scenic Trail. Road 163 connects from to the east, New Mexico State Road 52 and the adjacent Cibola National Forest to Forest Road 30 at the southwest, connecting the Gila Wilderness and Apache Creek, NM, while paralleling the Continental Divide, (which traverses around the west and partial northwest of the Plains of San Agustin).

Connected to the west and southwest of the Luera Mountains, is a similar sized mountain range, unnamed. Both are in the center-west of the Plains of San Agustin. The Plains trend northeasterly north of the two ranges; higher elevations of the Plains of San Agustin lie south, and southwest of the two ranges where the Continental Divide of the Americas goes from the west to meet the Black Range, where the Continental Divide then turns due south.

=== Luera Peak ===
There is no well-delineated ridgeline in the Luera Mountains. The water divide, the continental divide is in the southern foothills of the range. Luera Peak, in the center-north, 9,420 feet (2,871 m), is located at 33.826449°N 107.877548°W.

== Continental Divide ==
The Continental Divide of the Americas traverses around the northwest and west mountain perimeter, and central-southern section of the Plains of San Agustin. The scenic trail lies adjacent to the Divide, or follows the Continental Divide.
