= Alegres Mountain =

Landform in Catron County, New Mexico

- Location within New Mexico Location within the United States

Highest point
- Elevation: 10,227 ft (3,117 m)
- Prominence: 2,369 ft (722 m)
- Isolation: 54.46 mi (87.64 km) to West Blue Mountain
- Coordinates: 34°9′26″N 108°11′21″W

Geography
- Location: Catron County, New Mexico, United States
- Parent range: Colorado Plateau
- Topo map: USGS Alegres Mountain

Geology
- Rock age: c. 26 Million years ago
- Rock type: Bearwallow Mountain Andesite

Climbing
- Easiest route: Hiking, Open Country, Scramble

Alegres Mountain is located on the Colorado Plateau in Catron County, New Mexico. Alegres Mountain is found in the Mangas Mountains and is the 180th highest peak in New Mexico and ranked 30th by prominence.

Alegres Mountain is 10 miles (17 km) south-west of Pie Town, New Mexico and can be accessed via Dipping Vat Road (also referred to as Pipeline Springs Road).
