= Mangas Mountain Lookout Complex =

- U.S. National Register of Historic Places
- Location within New Mexico Location within the United States
- Nearest city: Mangas, New Mexico
- Coordinates: 34°03′07″N 108°18′24″W
- Area: less than one acre
- Built: 1934
- MPS: National Forest Fire Lookouts in the Southwestern Region TR
- NRHP reference No.: 87002471
- Added to NRHP: January 28, 1988

The Mangas Mountain Lookout Complex, on Mangas Mountain near Mangas, New Mexico, was built in 1934. It was listed on the National Register of Historic Places in 1988. The listing included one contributing building and one contributing structure.

It includes a fire lookout tower and a cabin or cottage.

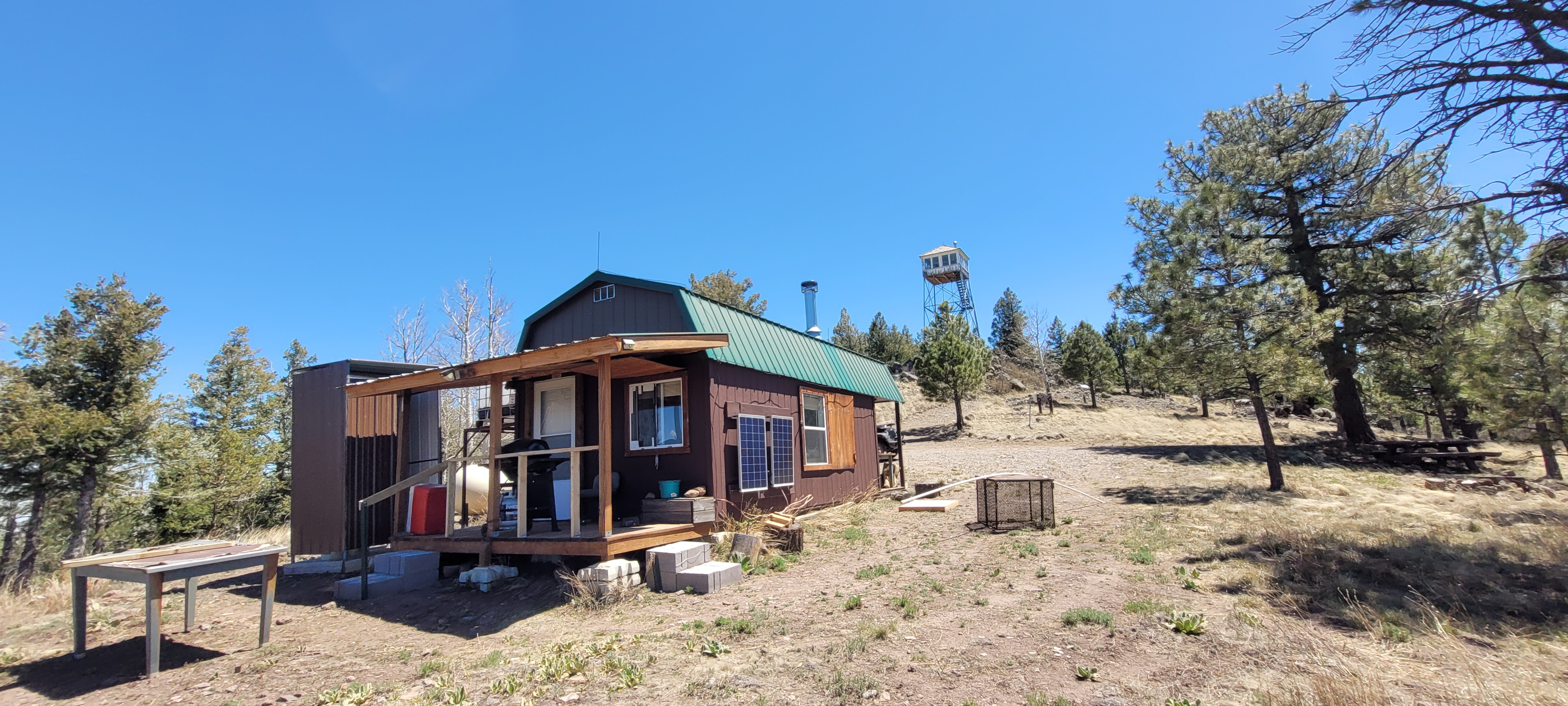
Mangas mountain, fire lookout tower
