= Canyon Creek Mountains =

Mountain range in New Mexico, US

- Location within New Mexico

Highest point
- Peak: East Elk Mountain
- Elevation: 9,058 ft (2,761 m)
- Coordinates: 33°29′49″N 108°15′53″W

Dimensions
- Length: 10 mi (16 km) SW-NE
- Width: 7 mi (11 km)

Geography
- Country: United States
- State: New Mexico
- Region(s): Gila National Forest; Continental Divide of the Americas
- County: Catron County, New Mexico
- Settlement(s): Collins Park, NM (Aragon, NM–Apache Creek, NM)
- Range coordinates: 33°29′49″N 108°15′53″W
- Borders on: Elk Mountains-NW; FR 30-(O Bar O Road)-N; Gila Wilderness-S

The Canyon Creek Mountains are a short 10 miles (16 km) long, mountain range located in southeast Catron County, New Mexico, near the source of the Gila River and north of the Gila Wilderness. The Elk Mountains are adjacent northwest, where the continental divide passes from north to east on the south of the Plains of San Agustin.

== Description ==
The range is short, only about 10 mi long, trends southwest to northeast, and merges into the eastern end of the Elk Mountains, which trend northwesterly to meet the Continental Divide.

There are only two prominent peaks; in the southeast, and away from the main ridgeline, lies Cooney Point, at 8,580 feet (2,615 m). The highest point of the range is in the northeast at East Elk Peak, 9,058 feet (2,761 m). The peak is located at 33.497008°N 108.264776°W.

== Continental Divide ==
The Continental Divide undergoes an east-west stretch northwest of the mountains, and northwest of the adjacent Elk Mountains. Forest Road 30 lies north of East Elk Peak, crosses the divide twice north of the Elk Mountains, then parallels the divide as it traverses through the Tularosa Mountains. Forest Road 30 terminates at Apache Creek, NM and intersects with State Roads 12 and 32.
