= Mangas, New Mexico =

Ghost town in New Mexico, United States

Coordinates: 34°09′25″N 108°19′09″W

Mangas is an extinct town in Catron County, in the U.S. state of New Mexico. The GNIS classifies it as a populated place.

Variant names were Mangus and Pinoville. A post office called Pinoville was established in 1905, the name was changed to Mangus in 1909, and the post office closed in 1943. The present name is after Mangas Coloradas, an Apache leader.
