= McKnight Mountain =

Mountain in New Mexico, United States

- Location within New Mexico

Highest point
- Elevation: 10,165 ft (3,098 m)
- Prominence: 2,525 ft (770 m)
- Coordinates: 33°03′07″N 107°51′01″W

Geography
- Location: Sierra / Grant counties, New Mexico, U.S.
- Parent range: Black Range
- Topo map: USGS Victorio Park

Climbing
- Easiest route: Trail hike

McKnight Mountain is the highest peak in the Black Range of southwestern New Mexico, in the southwestern United States. It is located about 30 miles (48 km) northeast of Silver City, in the Aldo Leopold Wilderness of the Gila National Forest.

The mountain is topped by a flat ridge running roughly north–south for about one-half mile (0.80 km); the north and south ends of the ridge are both listed at 10,165 feet (3,098 m). The mountain is forested up to near its summit, which is rocky and provides panoramic views. Its west slopes are the headwaters of the East Fork of the Mimbres River, which flows through McKnight Canyon, and its northwest slopes also feed into the Mimbres. The east side is drained by Las Animas Creek, which flows into the Rio Grande at Caballo Lake. While the Continental Divide runs along much of the Black Range, McKnight Mountain is not on the divide itself, which separates from the crest of the Black Range at Red Peak a few miles to the north.

McKnight Mountain is accessible via several trails. One is Trail 79, which runs along the crest of the Black Range, with a trailhead about 5 miles (8 km) south of the peak, located near McKnight Cabin at the end of Forest Road 152. Another, Trail 82, approaches the peak from the west through McKnight Canyon.
