= Chicoma Mountain =

Mountain in New Mexico, United States

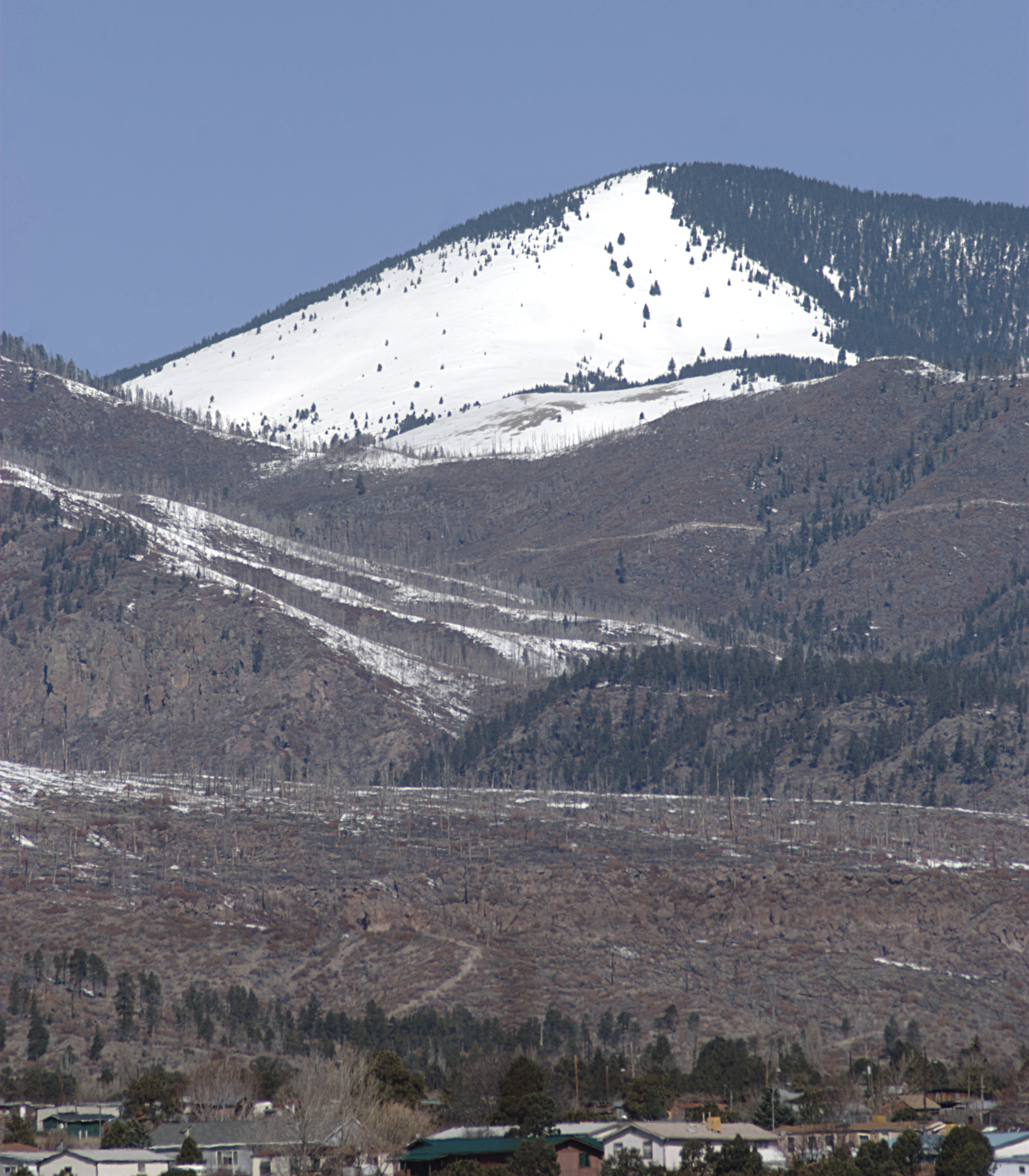
- From Los Alamos

Highest point
- Elevation: 11,561 ft (3,524 m) NAVD 88
- Prominence: 4,281 ft (1,305 m)
- Coordinates: 36°00′26″N 106°23′04″W

Geography
- Location within New Mexico
- Location: Rio Arriba County, New Mexico, U.S.
- Parent range: Jemez Mountains
- Topo map: USGS Polvadera Peak

Climbing
- Easiest route: Hike

Chicoma Mountain (Note: /tʃɪˈkoʊmə/ chih-KOH-mə; also spelled Tschicoma or Tchicoma) (Tewa: Tsikumu Pʼin, pronounced [tsìkùmù pʼìŋ], lit. 'obsidian-covered mountain') is the highest point in the Jemez Mountains, a prominent mountain range in the U.S. State of New Mexico. The tree line in this area is exceptionally high, and the mountain is forested almost all the way to its summit which is conspicuous from the towns of Los Alamos, Santa Fe, and Española and other areas in the valley of the Rio Grande in northern New Mexico. Like the rest of the Jemez, it is of volcanic origin; it lies on the northeast rim of the Valles Caldera, one of the best examples of a caldera in the United States.

The mountain is sacred to many of the Puebloan peoples of New Mexico, who traditionally regarded it as the "center of all." Much of it lies within the territory of the Santa Clara Pueblo. Access by hikers, hunters, and others, is correspondingly limited, although the summit can be reached via public lands on the north side. The Puye Cliff Dwellings in Santa Clara Canyon are an archaeological site of some significance; however, the cliff dwellings are not near Chicoma. Puye Cliff Dwellings are accessible via NM 30 to NM 5, about 30 minutes south of Chicoma Mountain. The site is located on the pueblo's land on the east side of the mountain, and are sometimes open to the public for a fee.

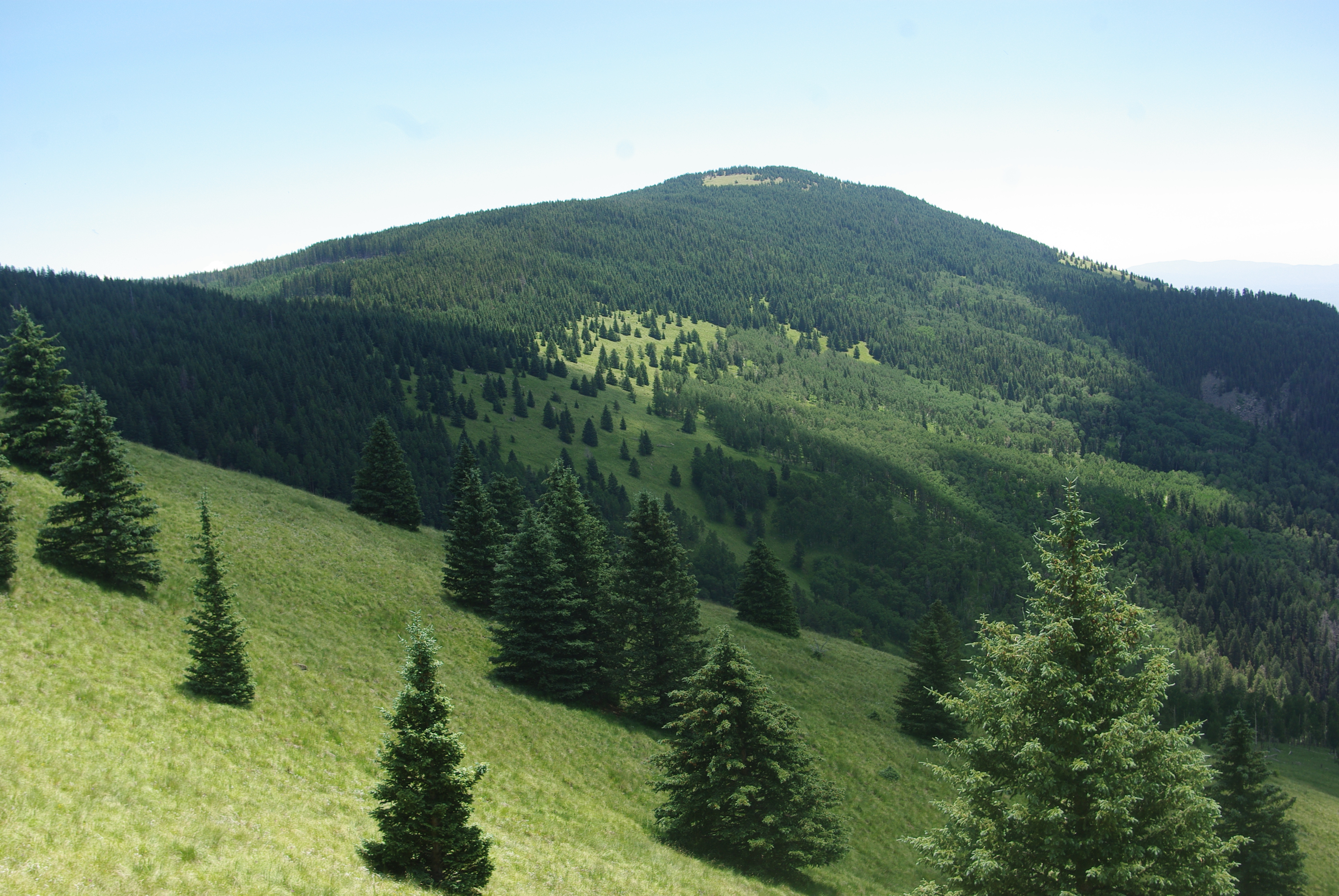
From the north

== Etymology ==
The Tewa name, Tsikumu Pʼin, translates roughly to 'mountain covered with pieces of obsidian' (tsee, "obsidian" + kumu, "cover" + pʼin, "mountain").

== See also ==
- Santa Fe National Forest
