= Manzano Peak =

Mountain in New Mexico, United States

- Location within New Mexico

Highest point
- Elevation: 10,098 ft (3,078 m)
- Prominence: 3,238 ft (987 m)
- Coordinates: 34°35′27″N 106°26′48″W

Geography
- Location: Torrance County, New Mexico, U.S.
- Parent range: Manzano Mountains
- Topo map: USGS Manzano Peak

Climbing
- Easiest route: Hike

Manzano Peak is the highest peak in the Manzano Mountains, a mountain range in the central part of the US State of New Mexico. It lies 7 miles (11 km) southwest of the town of Manzano and 18 miles (29 km) east-southeast of the town of Belen, in the Manzano Wilderness Area, part of the Mountainair Ranger District of the Cibola National Forest. It forms the striking southern anchor of the range, rising 3,900 feet (1,189 m) in 3 miles (5 km) above its western base. The summit is below the tree line, but has views to the east, south, and west.

Manzano Peak can be accessed via trail number 80 (the Kayser Trail), leading to the Crest Trail (number 170), from a trailhead on the east side of the range.
