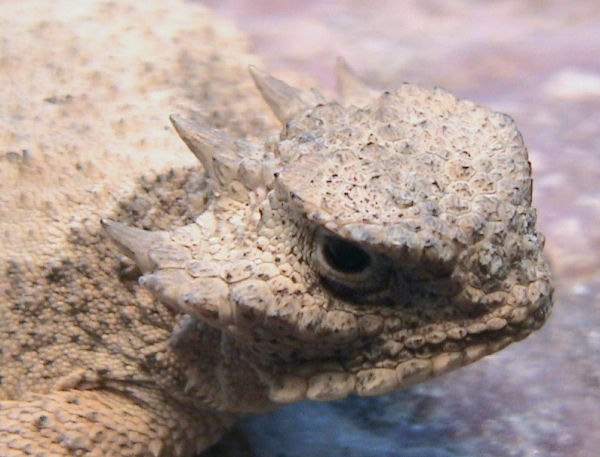

Conservation status
- Least Concern (IUCN 3.1)

Scientific classification
- Kingdom: Animalia
- Phylum: Chordata
- Order: Squamata
- Suborder: Iguania
- Family: Phrynosomatidae
- Genus: Phrynosoma
- Species: P. modestum

Binomial name
- Phrynosoma modestum Girard, 1852

= Roundtail horned lizard =

Species of lizard

The roundtail horned lizard (Phrynosoma modestum) is a species of lizard in the family Phrynosomatidae. It is one of the smaller species of the horned lizards (genus Phrynosoma). The specific epithet, modestum, is Latin, meaning "modest" or "calm". The species is native to the United States, in western Texas, New Mexico, eastern Arizona, and southeastern Colorado; and eight states in northcentral Mexico, where it is referred to as tapayaxtin.

== Habitat ==
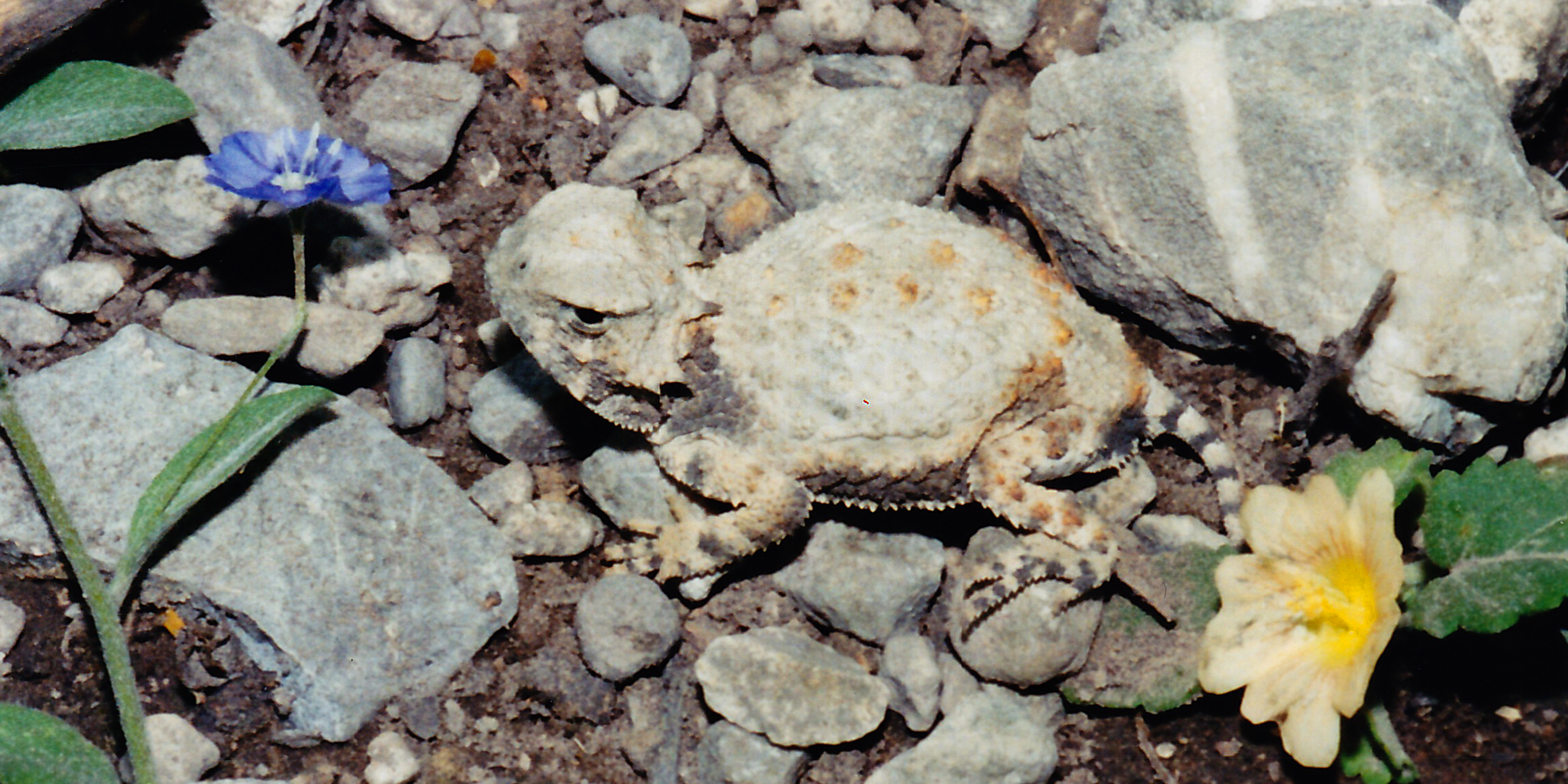
Roundtail horned lizard (Phrynosoma modestum), Municipality of Tula, Tamaulipas, Mexico (15 August 2004)

The roundtail horned lizard prefers rocky and sandy, semiarid habitat with sparse vegetation, near harvester ant or especially honeypot ant colonies, which are its primary diet.

== Description ==
The coloration of the roundtail horned lizard usually reflects the color of the soil in its native habitat. Most specimens are uniformly gray in color, but can also be light brown, or even a pale yellow. Often, darker-colored regions occur around the neck and groin, and sometimes striping on the tail.

Phrynosoma modestum is a short, flat, round-bodied lizard with short limbs, and a small head, which has a distinctive crest of nearly equal-length horns. Unlike other horned lizards, it lacks a fringe of lateral scales and does not seek to flatten itself to the ground to eliminate shadow; instead, it hunches its body into the shape of a rock for camouflage, boldly casting a shadow.

Maximum size is 7 cm (2.7 in) snout-to-vent length (SVL), and 10.5 cm (4.3 in) total length (tail included).

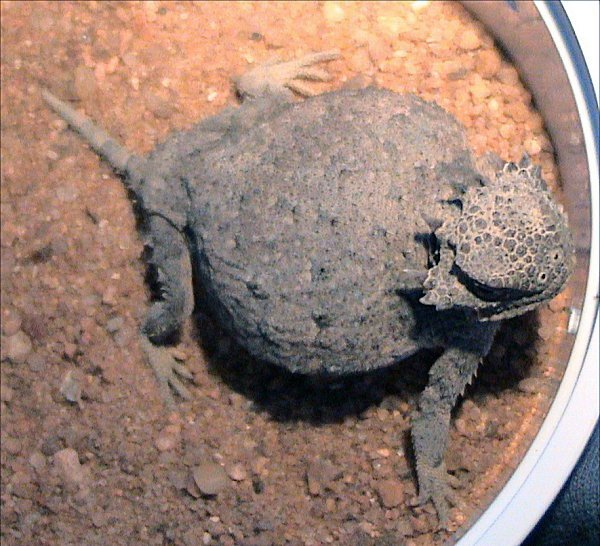
Phrynosoma modestum

== Reproduction ==
The roundtail horned lizard is oviparous, breeding and laying eggs in early summer.
