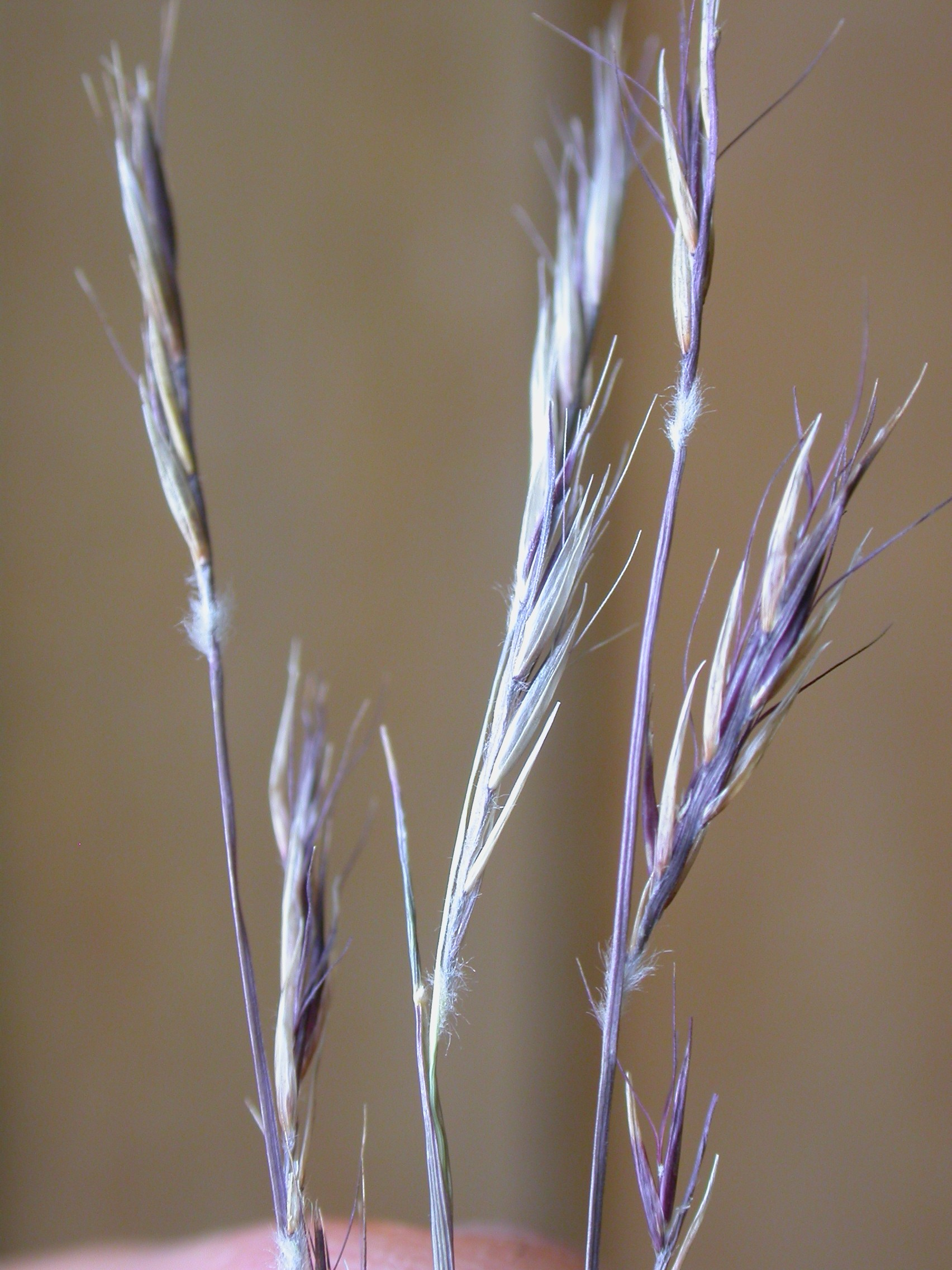

Conservation status
- Secure (NatureServe)

Scientific classification
- Kingdom: Plantae
- Clade: Tracheophytes
- Clade: Angiosperms
- Clade: Monocots
- Clade: Commelinids
- Order: Poales
- Family: Poaceae
- Subfamily: Chloridoideae
- Genus: Bouteloua
- Species: B. eriopoda

Binomial name
- Bouteloua eriopoda (Torr.) Torr.

Synonyms
- Chondrosum eriopodum Torr. in Emory

= Bouteloua eriopoda =

Species of grass

Bouteloua eriopoda, commonly known as black grama, is a perennial prairie grass that is native to the Southwestern United States. Its main means of reproduction is by stolons, as its ratio of viable seeds to sterile ones is naturally low. The disparity may play a role in its lack of tolerance to overgrazing (relative to other grasses), but aside from this B. eriopoda is a good forage food for livestock.

It was first described, as Chondrosum eriopodum, in 1848 from specimens collected along and nearby the "Del Norte" river in New Mexico.

== Distribution ==
B. eriopoda is found in the following U.S. states: Arizona, California, Colorado, Kansas, New Mexico, Nevada, Oklahoma, Texas, Utah and Wyoming.
