= Capitan Mountains =

Mountain range in New Mexico, United States

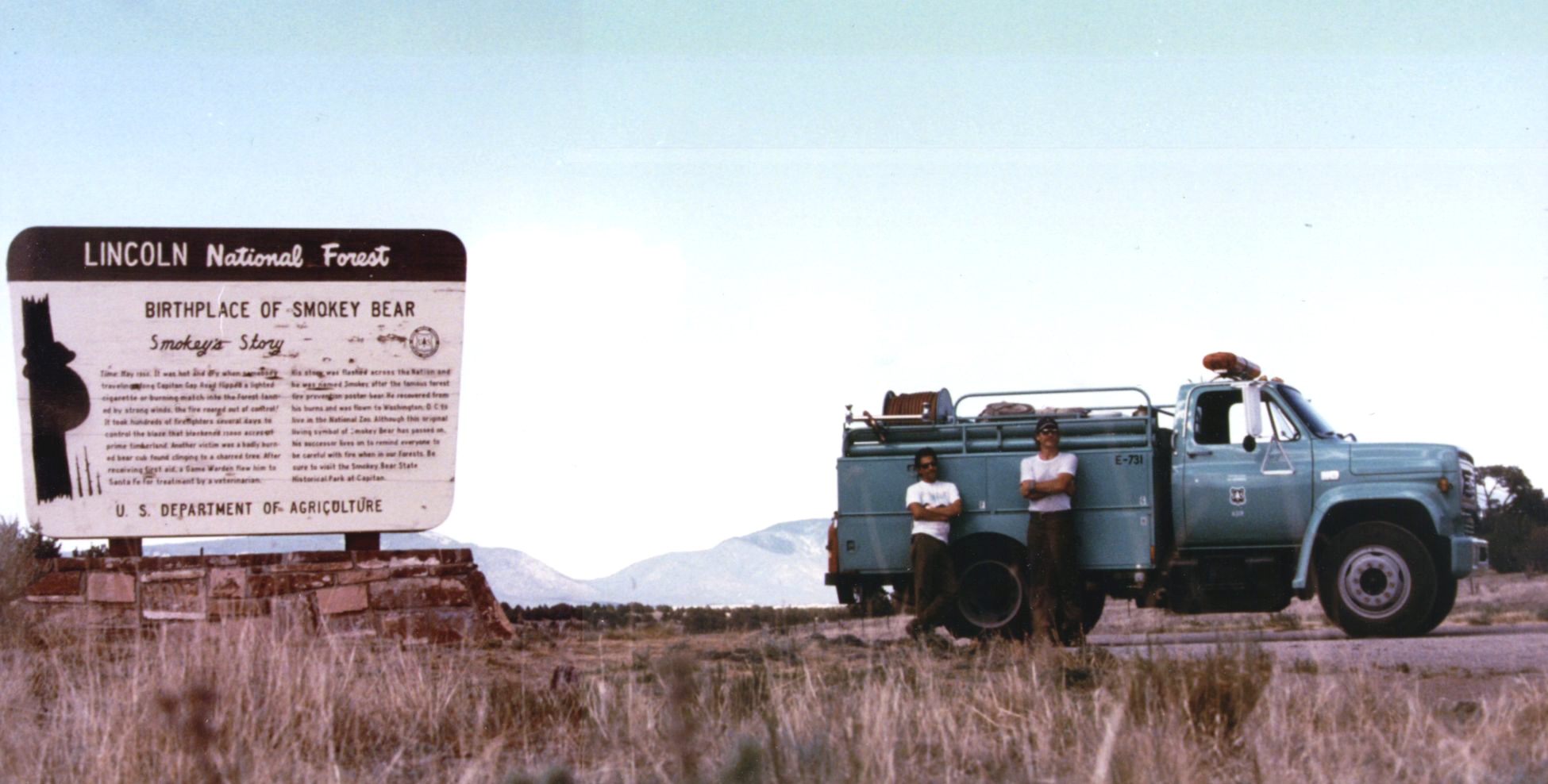

Highest point
- Coordinates: 33.61056°N 105.41333°W

Geography
- Location within New Mexico
- Location: Lincoln County, New Mexico

The Capitan Mountains are a mountain range in Lincoln County, in south-central New Mexico in the southwestern United States. The range is about 20 miles (32 km) long from east to west being about 6 miles (10 km) wide and were formed from a large elongated granite intrusion similar to the round one that produced Carrizo Mountain to the west.

The small town of Capitan is on the southwestern side of the mountains and is the location of Smokey Bear Historical Park. This is the park that memorializes the famous bear that was rescued from the Capitan Gap Fire in the Capitan Mountains. The highest point in the range is an unnamed peak reaching 10,201 feet (3139 m) which is 118 feet (36 m) higher than Capitan Peak. The entirety of the range lies within Lincoln National Forest and is separated from the Sacramento Mountains to the south and Sierra Blanca to the southwest by the valley of Rio Bonito.
