= Black Range =

Mountain range in southwest New Mexico

- Devil's Mountains
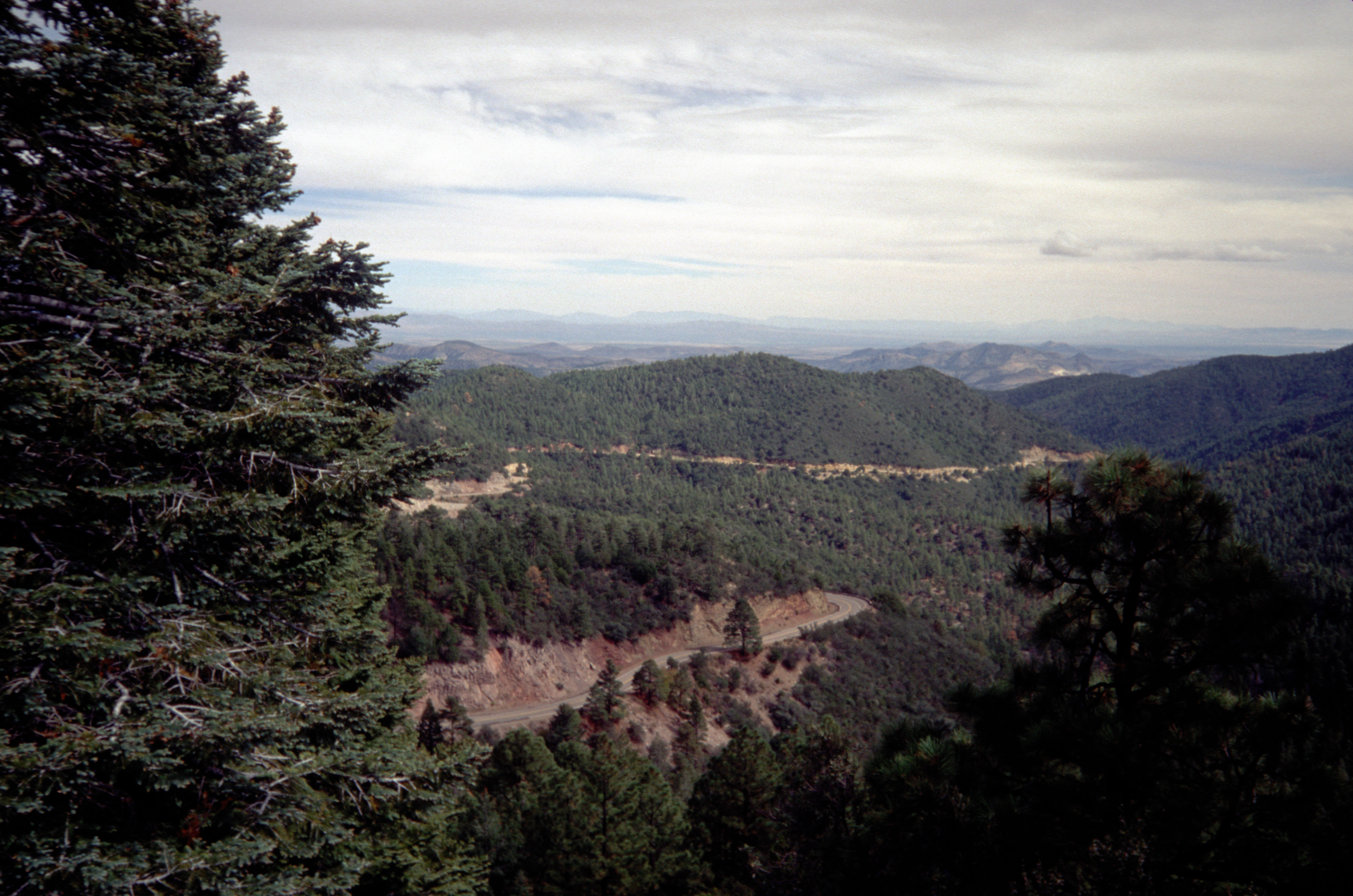
- View from the Geronimo Trail Scenic Byway

Highest point
- Elevation: 10,165 ft (3,098 m)
- Coordinates: 33°03′07″N 107°51′01″W

Geography
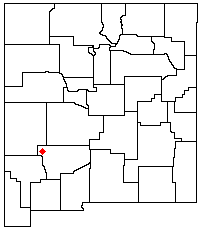
- Location of the Black Range within New Mexico
- Location: New Mexico

Geology
- Mountain type: Igneous mountain range

The Black Range (also called the Devil's Mountains or Sierra Diablo) is an igneous mountain range running north–south in Sierra, Grant, and Catron counties in southwest New Mexico, in the Southwestern United States.

== Description ==
The range's central ridge forms the western and eastern borders, respectively, of the two counties through much of their contact. The range is about 55 miles (88 km) long from north to south and up to 18 miles (29 km) wide. The highest point is McKnight Mountain. The Black Range lies almost entirely within the Gila National Forest. The Mimbres River originates from the mountain snowpack. The Mimbres Mountains, the southernmost part of the range, are usually included as part of the Black Range.

Access to the range is primarily via New Mexico State Road 152 (NM 152), which crosses the Black Range on its way from Kingston on the east towards San Lorenzo on the west. NM 152 crosses the range at 8,228-foot (2,508 m) Emory Pass, where there is a hiking trail that covers the entire length of the mountains along the central ridge. There are also a number of campgrounds, some with hiking trails, along NM 152 as it goes down Iron Canyon on the west side of the range. With the exception of the areas along NM 152, most of the range is very difficult to traverse and almost entirely undeveloped. The Aldo Leopold Wilderness, 202,016 acres (81,753 ha) in size, lies along the crest of the Black Range north of NM 152.

== History ==
The southern portion of the Black Range, which are also known as the Mimbres Mountains, was occupied by the Mimbres people whose culture peaked about 1000 C.E. and ended about 1150 C.E. Their most famous site is the Gila Cliff Dwellings. Silver was discovered in the Black Range in the late 1870s, first in 1876 at Lake Valley, and then by Harry Pye in 1879 at Chloride. This led to a silver rush, and silver and gold mines flourished in the Black Range through the end of the 19th century.

== See also ==
- List of mountain ranges of New Mexico
