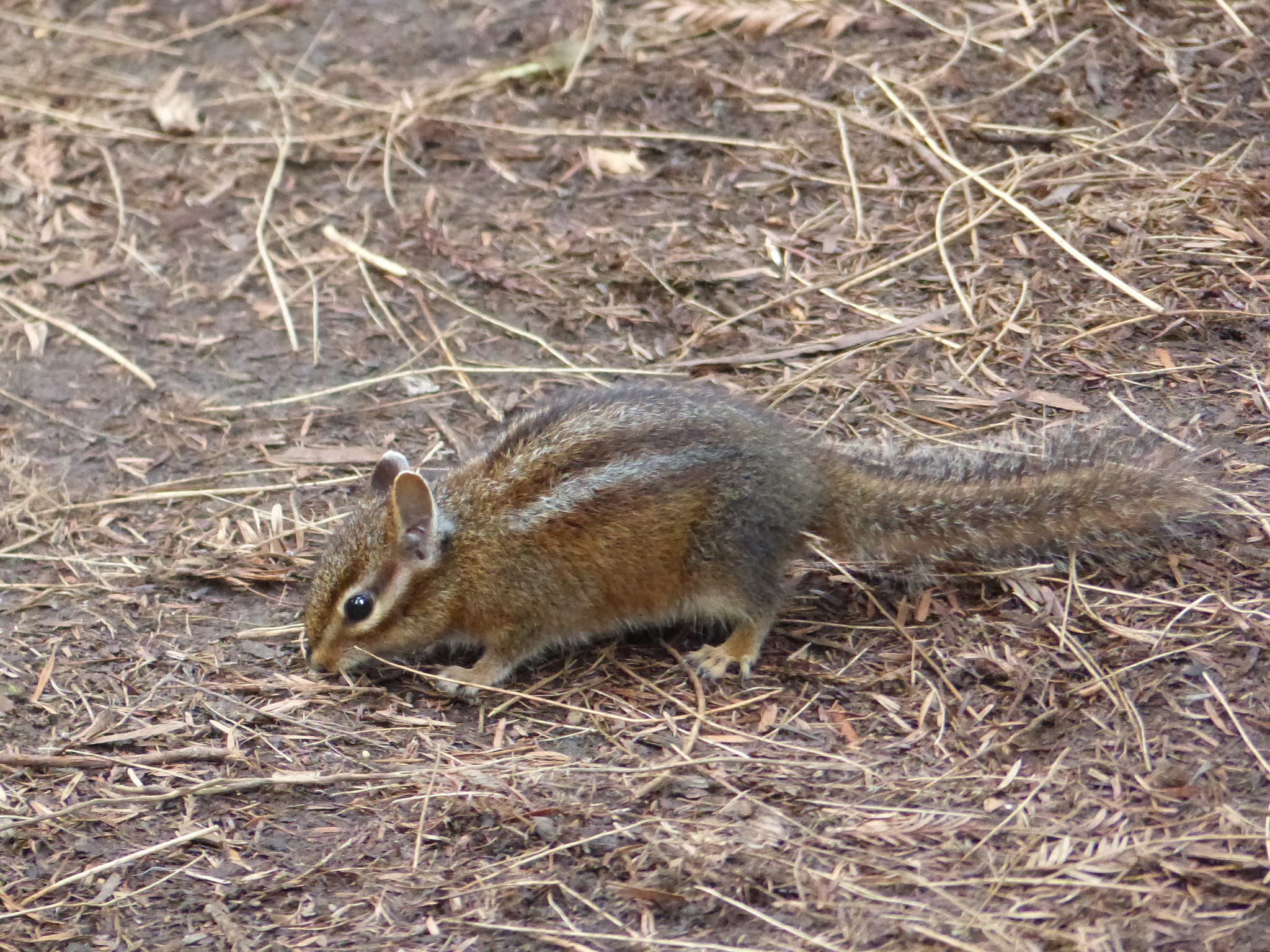

Conservation status
- Least Concern (IUCN 3.1)

Scientific classification
- Kingdom: Animalia
- Phylum: Chordata
- Class: Mammalia
- Order: Rodentia
- Family: Sciuridae
- Genus: Neotamias
- Species: N. siskiyou

Binomial name
- Neotamias siskiyou (A. H. Howell, 1922)
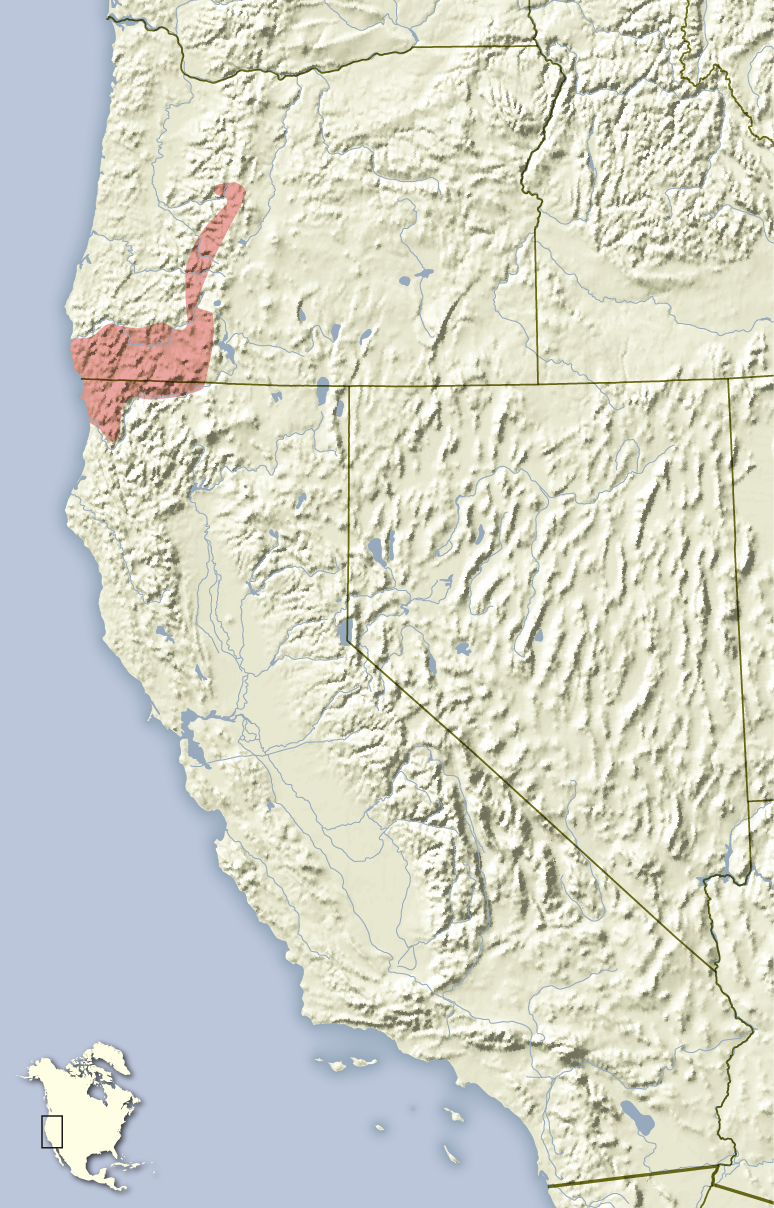
- IUCN range map for Tamias siskiyou

Synonyms
- Tamias siskiyou A. H. Howell, 1922

= Siskiyou chipmunk =

Species of rodent

The Siskiyou chipmunk (Neotamias siskiyou) is a species of rodent in the family Sciuridae. It is endemic to northern California and central Oregon in the United States.

== Anatomy and morphology ==
The Siskiyou chipmunk is closest in appearance to Allen's chipmunk (Neotamias senex) and the yellow-cheeked chipmunk (Neotamias ochrogenys). Its coat is brown-gray, with a pattern of five dark brown and four gray stripes along its back; the central stripe tends to be blackish and darker in color compared to the other stripes. Additionally, Neotamias siskiyou have three brown and two gray stripes on each cheek. The specific appearance of the Siskiyou chipmunk varies due to the large geographic range the species inhabits, with larger and darker members found on the coasts compared to those found further inland.

== Distribution and habitat ==
Neotamias siskiyou is found in northern California, in Humboldt and Del Norte counties, as well as in Oregon, in the Siskiyou mountains. The extent of the Siskiyou chipmunk is delineated in the south by the Klamath River, and in the north by the Rogue River.

== Behavior ==
Siskiyou chipmunks are most active early at night, but they also have behavioral peaks early in the morning and in the middle of the day. They have a distinct call characterized by a single syllable, and usually communicate with an evenly-spaced series of these calls.

== Taxonomy ==
Neotamias siskiyou belongs to the Townsend group of chipmunks, which are a group of closely related chipmunk species inhabiting the western United States and Canada. Other chipmunk species in this group include: Neotamias senex (Allen's chipmunk), Neotamias ochrogenys (Yellow-cheeked chipmunk), and Neotamias townsendii (Townsend's chipmunk). This group of chipmunks was originally thought to be members of a single species. However, Sutton and Nadler cited lack of inter-breeding and the distinctive physical appearance of each type as indications that they were distinct species.
