= Coahuila chipmunk =

Scientific classification
- Kingdom: Animalia
- Phylum: Chordata
- Class: Mammalia
- Order: Rodentia
- Family: Sciuridae
- Genus: Neotamias
- Species: N. solivagus

Binomial name
- Neotamias solivagus (A. H. Howell, 1922)

Species of rodent

The Coahuila chipmunk (Neotamias solivagus), also called the Sierra del Carmen chipmunk, is a species of chipmunk native to the Gran Sierra Plegada of the Sierra Madre Oriental, in the central area of eastern Coahuila and western Nuevo León, in northern Mexico. It was formerly considered a subspecies of both Neotamias bulleri and Neotamias durangae. Those two species are found in the Sierra Madre Occidental, while this species is native to the Sierra Madre Oriental.
