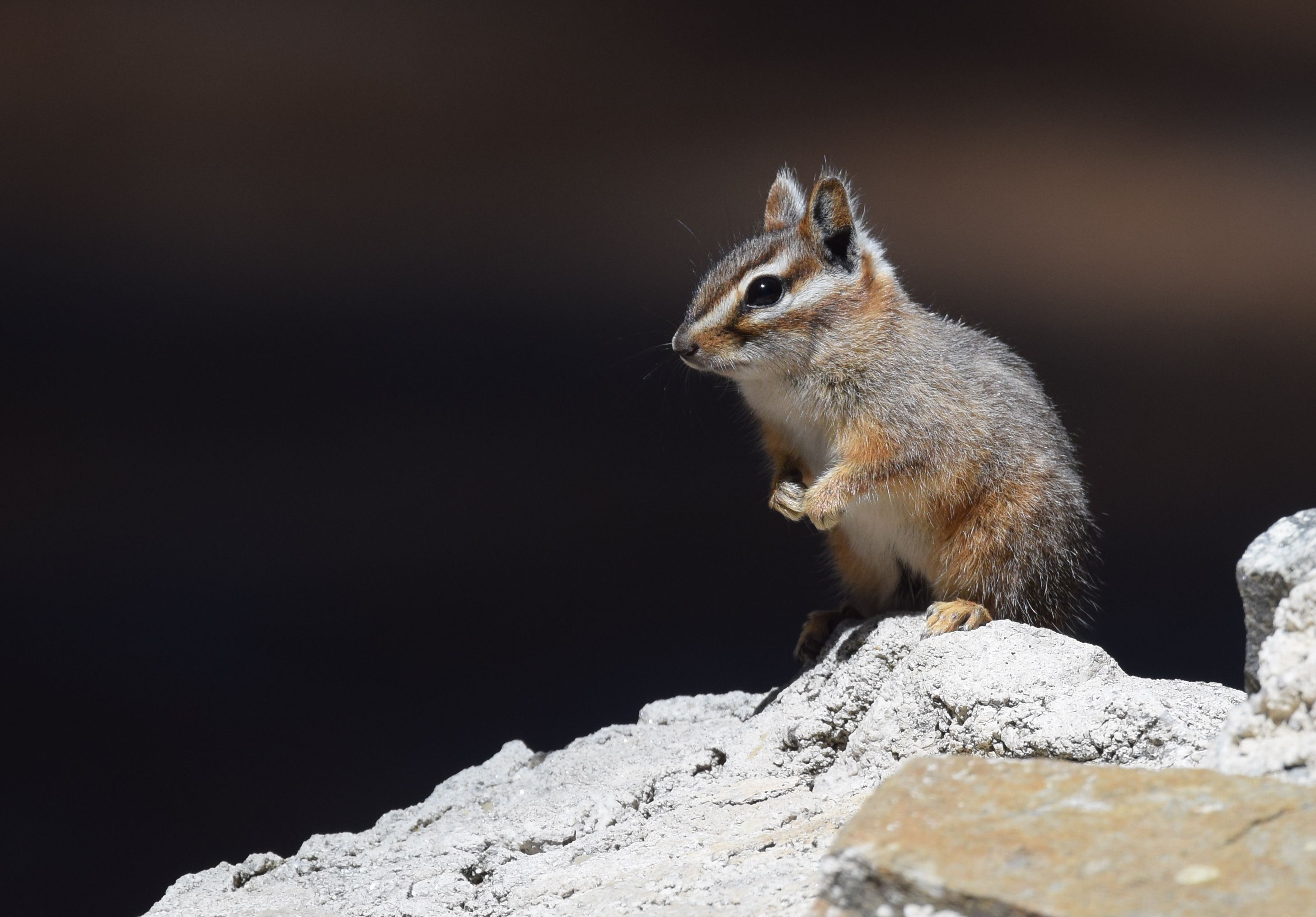

Conservation status
- Least Concern (IUCN 3.1)

Scientific classification
- Kingdom: Animalia
- Phylum: Chordata
- Class: Mammalia
- Order: Rodentia
- Family: Sciuridae
- Genus: Neotamias
- Species: N. dorsalis

Binomial name
- Neotamias dorsalis (Baird, 1855)
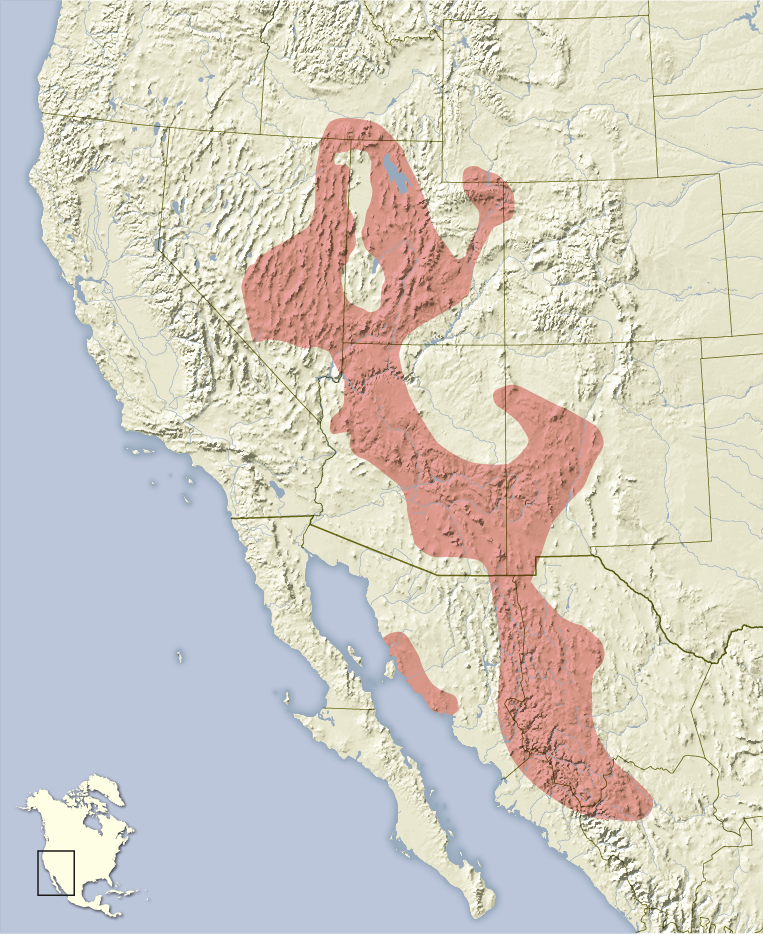
- Distribution of the cliff chipmunk

Synonyms
- Tamias dorsalis Baird, 1855

= Cliff chipmunk =

Species of rodent

The cliff chipmunk (Neotamias dorsalis) is a small, bushy-tailed squirrel that typically lives along cliff walls or boulder fields bordering Pinyon-juniper woodlands in the Western United States and Mexico (commonly spotted in northern Arizona to Colorado). Cliff chipmunks are very agile, and can often be seen scaling steep cliff walls. Cliff chipmunks do not amass body fat as the more common ground squirrel does. They create caches of food which they frequent during the cold winter months.

== Description ==
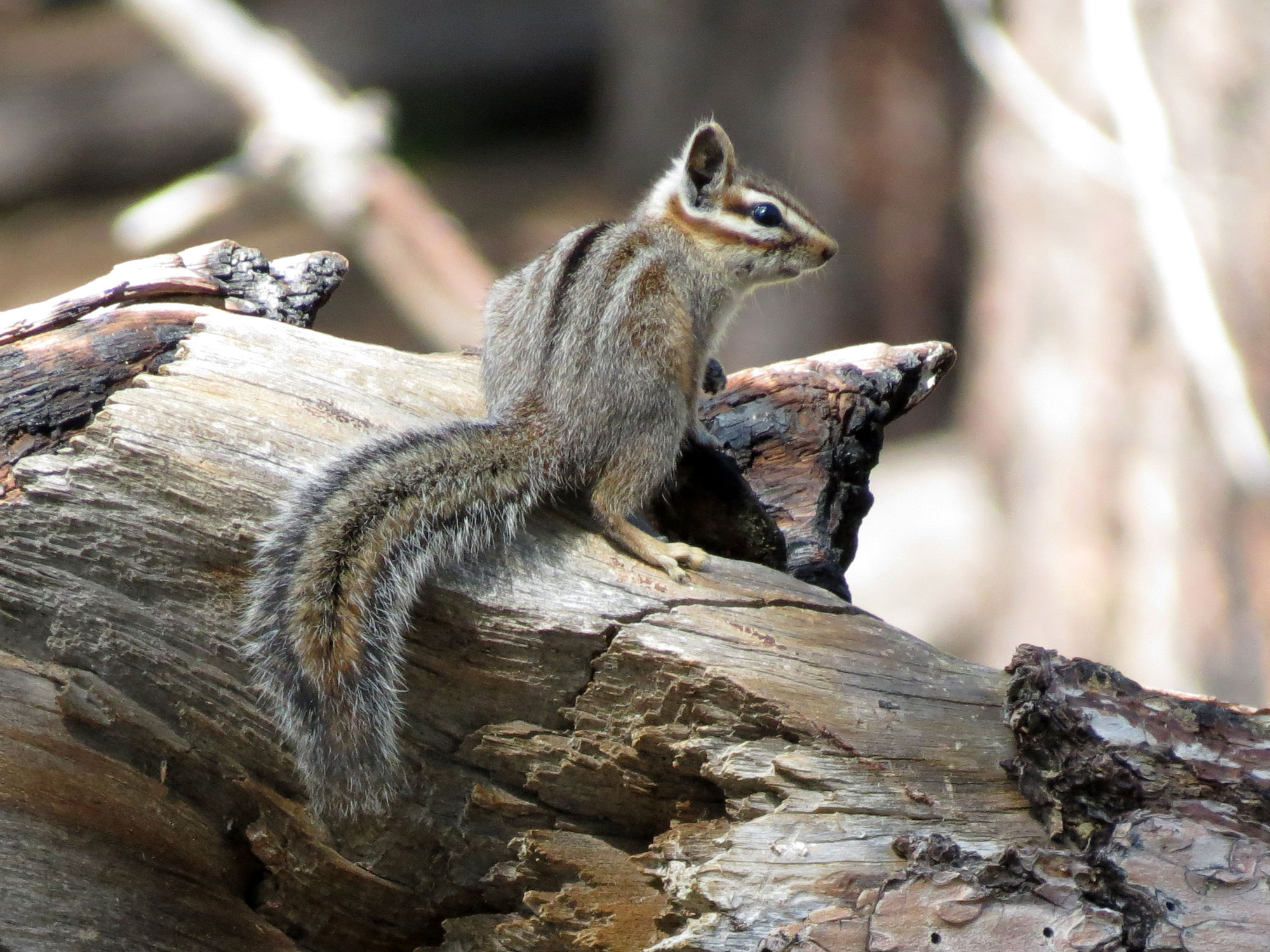
Cliff chipmunk on a log

The chipmunks' size varies from 8 to 10 inches (20 to 25 cm), and they weigh an average of 2.5 oz (70 g). These small creatures live to a staggering 12 1/2 years. The chipmunks are brown on their underside and gray on the back, with white stripes on their face.

== Habitat ==
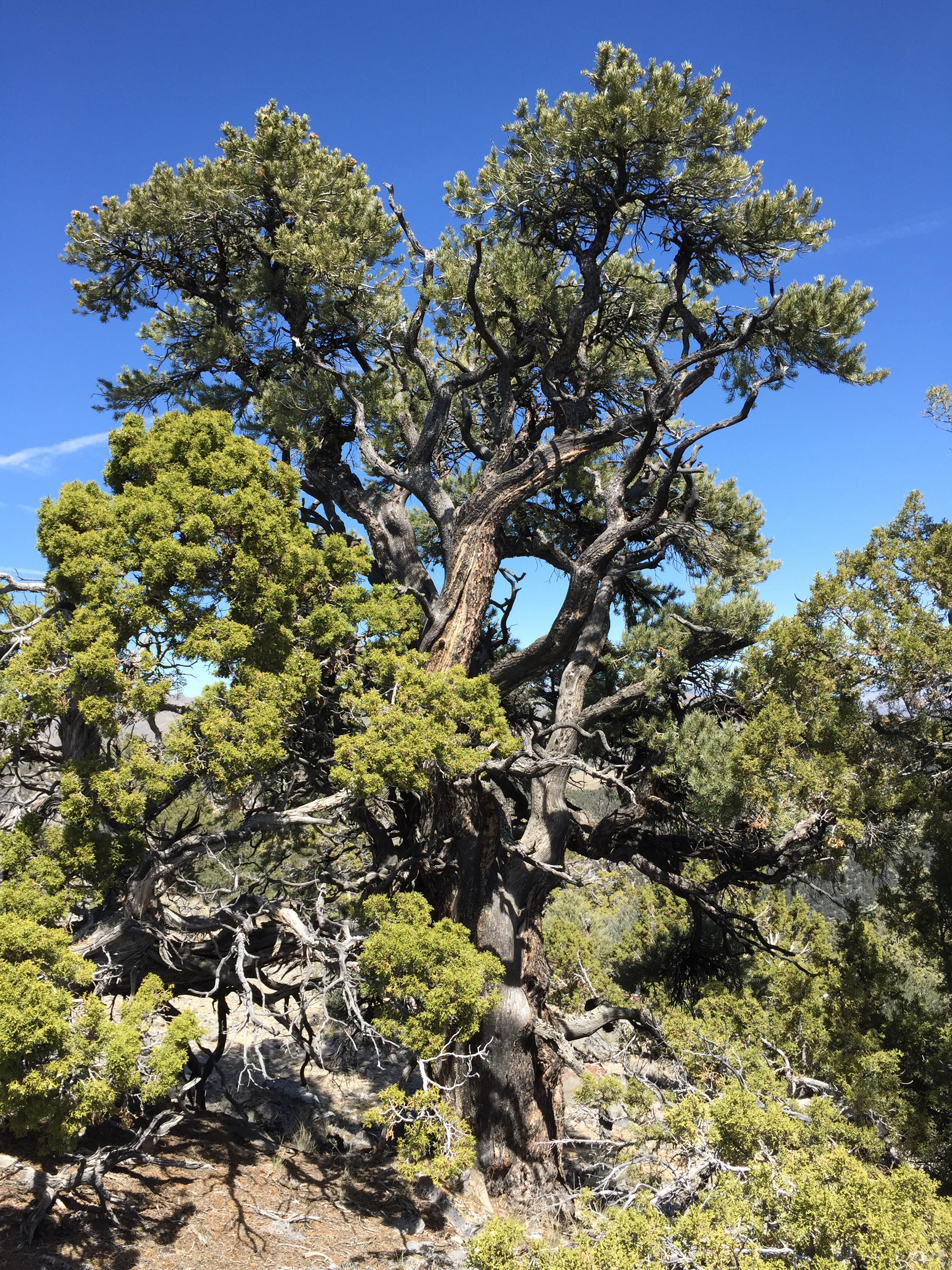
Pinyon-juniper woodlands

The cliff chipmunk nests near cliffs in pinyon-juniper woodlands hence its name "cliff chipmunk". They are found at higher altitudes such as 5,000–12,000 ft (1,500–3,700 m) above sea level. A common destination for spotting the cliff chipmunk is the cliffs of the Grand Canyon. The cliff chipmunk is active mostly during the day, therefore easy to spot. The chipmunk's diet consists of juniper berries, pine seeds, and acorns.

- Media related to Neotamias dorsalis at Wikimedia Commons

== See also ==
- Gray-footed chipmunk
- Neotamias
- Sciuridae
