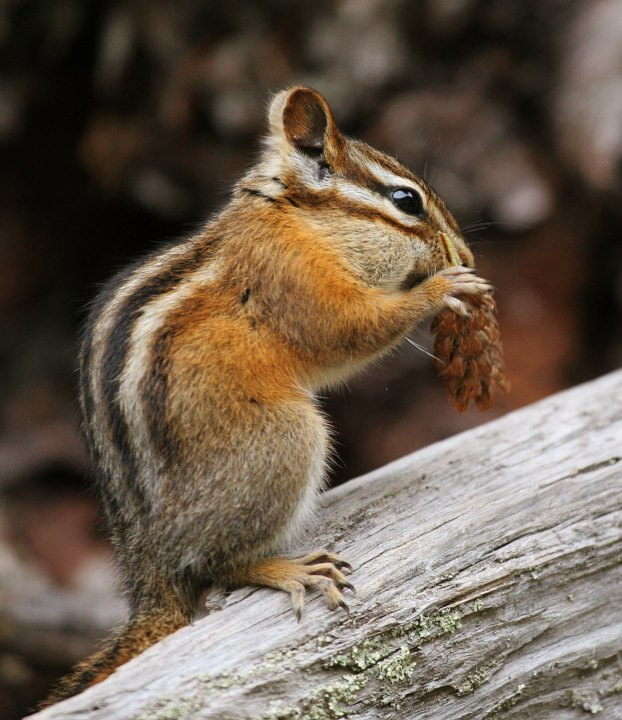
- Least chipmunk (Neotamias minimus)

Scientific classification
- Kingdom: Animalia
- Phylum: Chordata
- Class: Mammalia
- Order: Rodentia
- Family: Sciuridae
- Subtribe: Tamiina
- Genus: Neotamias; A. H. Howell, 1929

Type species
- Eutamias merriami J. A. Allen, 1889

Diversity
- 23 species
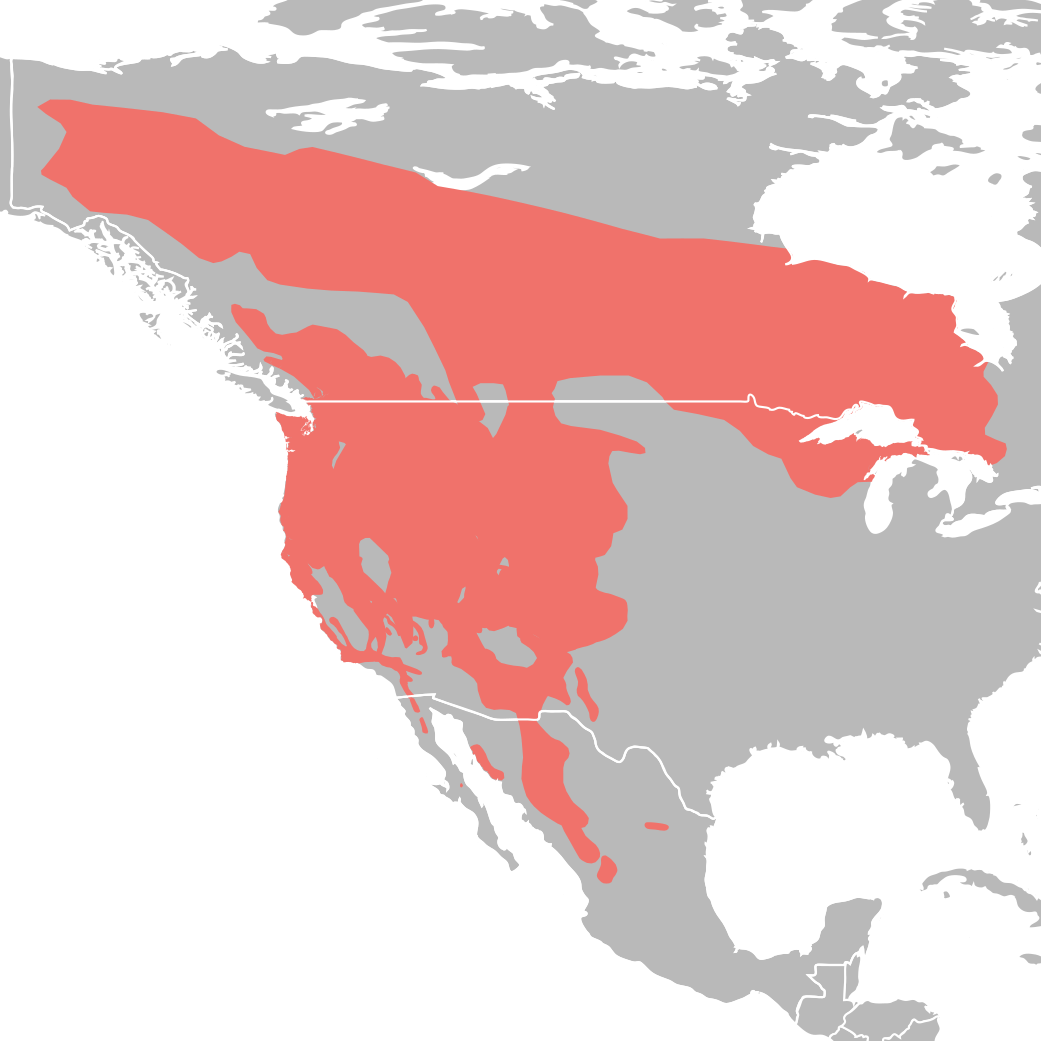
- Neotamias distribution

= Neotamias =

Genus of rodents

Neotamias is a genus of chipmunks within the tribe Marmotini of the squirrel family. It contains 23 species, which mostly occur in western North America. Along with Eutamias, this genus is often considered a subgenus of Tamias.

== Species ==
- Alpine chipmunk, Neotamias alpinus
- Yellow-pine chipmunk, Neotamias amoenus
- Buller's chipmunk, Neotamias bulleri
- Gray-footed chipmunk, Neotamias canipes
- Gray-collared chipmunk, Neotamias cinereicollis
- Cliff chipmunk, Neotamias dorsalis
- Durango chipmunk, Neotamias durangae
- Merriam's chipmunk, Neotamias merriami
- Least chipmunk, Neotamias minimus
- California chipmunk, Neotamias obscurus
- Yellow-cheeked chipmunk, Neotamias ochrogenys
- Palmer's chipmunk, Neotamias palmeri
- Panamint chipmunk, Neotamias panamintinus
- Long-eared chipmunk, Neotamias quadrimaculatus
- Colorado chipmunk, Neotamias quadrivittatus
- Red-tailed chipmunk, Neotamias ruficaudus
- Hopi chipmunk, Neotamias rufus
- Allen's chipmunk, Neotamias senex
- Siskiyou chipmunk, Neotamias siskiyou
- Sonoma chipmunk, Neotamias sonomae
- Lodgepole chipmunk, Neotamias speciosus
- Townsend's chipmunk, Neotamias townsendii
- Uinta chipmunk, Neotamias umbrinus

Three subspecies have been recognized as distinct species by some authorities:

- Crater chipmunk, Neotamias cratericus, split from N. amoenus
- Coulee chipmunk, Neotamias grisescens, split from N. minimus
- Coahuila chipmunk, Neotamias solivagus, split from N. durangae
