= Coulee chipmunk =

Scientific classification
- Kingdom: Animalia
- Phylum: Chordata
- Class: Mammalia
- Order: Rodentia
- Family: Sciuridae
- Genus: Neotamias
- Species: N. grisescens

Binomial name
- Neotamias grisescens A. H. Howell, 1925

Species of rodent

The Coulee chipmunk (Neotamias grisescens) is a species of chipmunk native to the Channeled Scablands in central Washington. It was formerly considered a subspecies of Neotamias minimus. It is sympatric with both N. minimus and N. amoenus; it can be differentiated by these species due to its overall grayer coloration.

== Description ==
It resembles Neotamias minimus pictus, but is smaller, particularly on the hind feet. It's also a grayer and less yellow color, with the dark stripes on the back being pretty narrow and the middle pair of light stripes being a lot wider. The tail also tends to be grayer and paler.

== Distribution ==
It's endemic to the Channeled Scablands of Central and Eastern Washington, originally being known from the Grand Coulee in Douglas and Grant counties.
