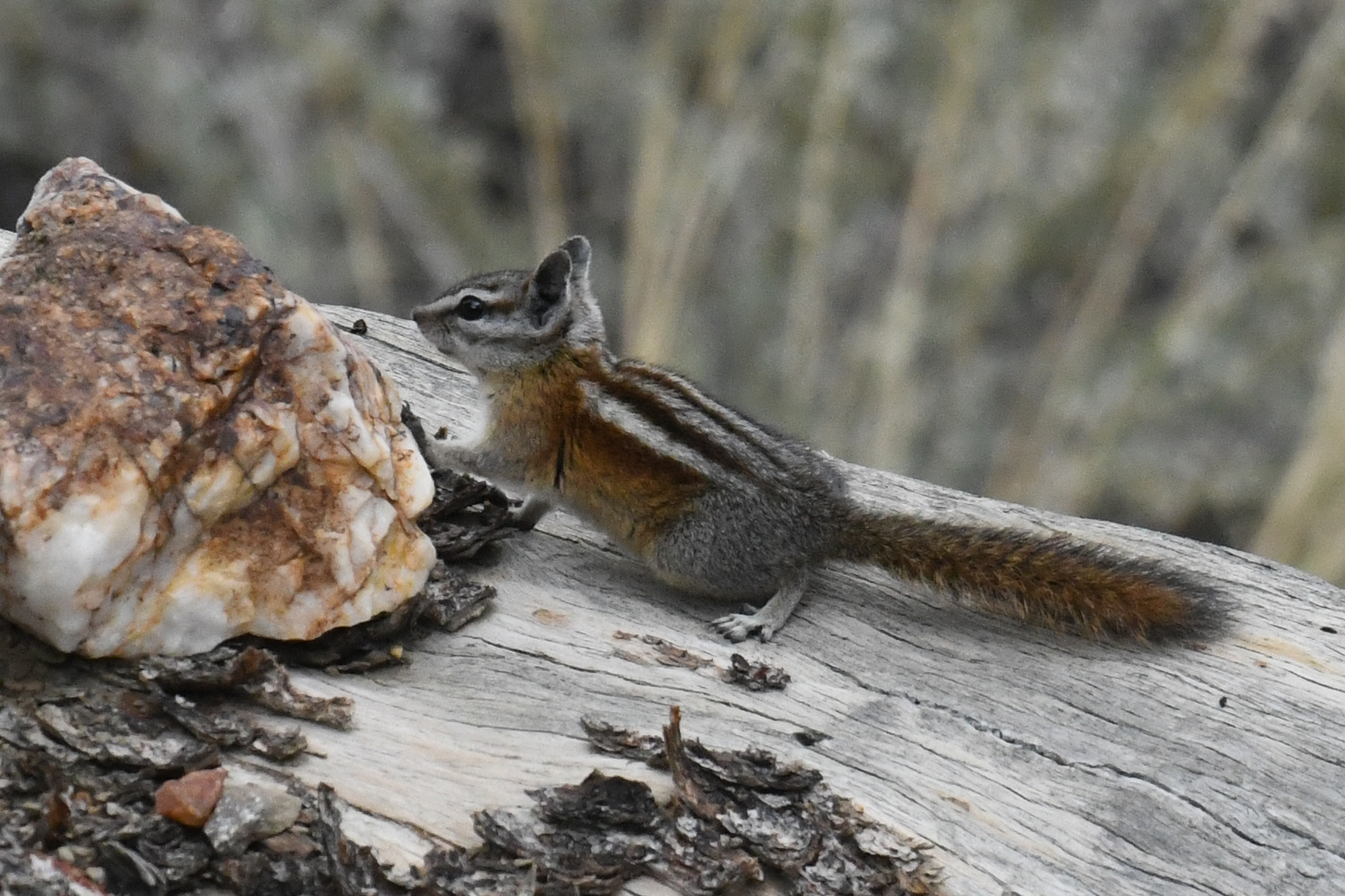

Conservation status
- Least Concern (IUCN 3.1)

Scientific classification
- Kingdom: Animalia
- Phylum: Chordata
- Class: Mammalia
- Order: Rodentia
- Family: Sciuridae
- Genus: Neotamias
- Species: N. panamintinus

Binomial name
- Neotamias panamintinus (Merriam, 1893)

Synonyms
- Tamias panamintinus Merriam, 1893

= Panamint chipmunk =

Species of rodent

The Panamint chipmunk (Neotamias panamintinus) is a species of rodent in the squirrel family, Sciuridae. It is endemic to desert mountain areas of southeast California and southwest Nevada in the United States.

It is considered a species of least concern on the IUCN Red List due to its broad range, prevalence, and no known major threats. The Panamint chipmunk occurs in pinyon pine-juniper woodlands in bushes, boulders, and on cliffs.

Environmentally, the Panamint chipmunks are a prey species that contributes to the diets of their predators, including birds, raptors, coyotes, foxes, and bobcats.

== Description ==
Panamint chipmunks are medium-sized chipmunks with a head-and-body length of about 11–12 cm (4.5 in) and a tail length of roughly 9–10 cm (3.5–4 in). Adults weigh between 74 and 105 g, with females on average somewhat larger than males (a kind of sexual dimorphism common in chipmunks). In summer, their fur is a bright golden or reddish-brown on the shoulders and sides with a grayish tinge on the anterior back. They have characteristic dark and light stripes on the back and face: five dark dorsal stripes divided by lighter stripes, which are bold on the upper back and diminish toward the rump. The core dorsal stripe is normally brown, while the peripheral stripes mix with the body coloration. The flanks are grayish, and the top of the head is a light gray with less dark facial striping. In winter, the coat becomes longer, silkier, and more yellowish, with overall paler patterns. The pelage coloration and pattern assist hide the animal against the rocky outcrops and scrub of its habitat (a cryptic coloration).

== Taxonomy ==
The Panamint chipmunk is a member of the tribe ground squirrels and is one of 23 species of western chipmunks within the genus Neotamias. Clinton Hart Merriam initially classified it as Tamias panamintinus in 1893. Western chipmunks were once categorized in the genus Eutamias, but contemporary taxonomists typically group them within Neotamias, occasionally as a subgenus of Tamias. Two subspecies of the Panamint chipmunk are identified: the nominate T. p. panamintinus and T. p. acrus. T. p. panamintinus, located in the Panamint and neighboring mountains, is somewhat larger and lighter, exhibiting tawny sides and a grayer crown. In contrast, T. p. acrus, originating from the Kingston and Clark Mountains, is smaller, featuring deeper brownish sides and a more slender skull. Genetic research indicates that the Panamint chipmunk is closely related to the least chipmunk (Neotamias minimus) and the long-eared chipmunk (N. quadrimaculatus) within the western chipmunk classification.

== Distribution and habitat ==
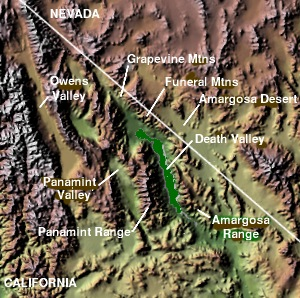
Map of Death Valley region

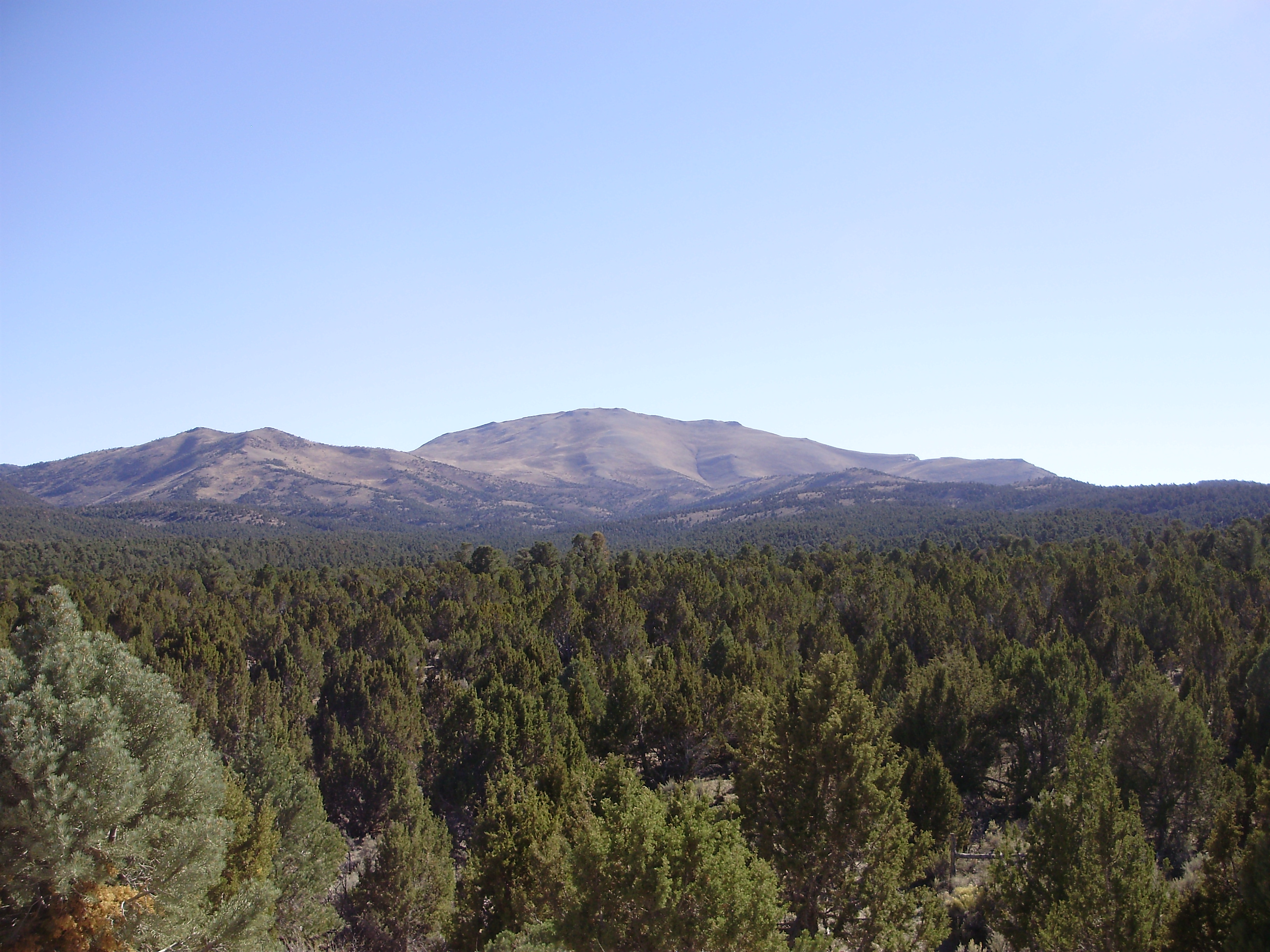
^{Pinyon juniper woodland}

The Panamint chipmunk is exclusively located in southwestern North America, particularly in regions of eastern California and western Nevada. Its distribution is sporadic, limited to hilly regions. In California, it is found in the eastern slopes of the southern Sierra Nevada and in other desert mountain ranges, including the Panamint, Argus, Inyo, White, Clark, Granite, Kingston, Providence, and Mescal ranges. The species was initially identified in the Panamint Range, currently part of Death Valley National Park, and it also resides in the Mojave National Preserve and other elevated desert regions. People live in the mountainous parts of Nevada's southwestern part, such as the Spring Mountains (close to Mt. Charleston), the Sweetwater, Wassuk, Grapevine, Silver Peak, and Excelsior ranges. The height varies from roughly 1,300 to 2,700 meters (about 4,500 to 9,000 feet) above sea level. The Panamint chipmunk has a strong preference for pinyon-juniper woods that grow in rocky areas throughout this range. It is usually found on dry, rocky slopes with lots of granite formations, boulder groups, and cliff ledges. The soil is thin, and the plants are mostly scrub and scattered pinyon pine (Pinus monophylla) and juniper (Juniperus) trees.

This species thrives in conditions that are too hot and dry for many other chipmunks. For example, it lives in sun-drenched talus and rock formations in desert highlands where there isn't much shade. It often lives in small spaces between rocks and in underground tunnels, where it can breed and stay safe from extreme temperatures. Panamint chipmunks are mostly not found in wide flats or thick sagebrush plains. Also, in certain places where they live, they live next to the least chipmunk (N. minimus), which prefers sagebrush flats that the Panamint chipmunk does not like. It is thought that the different ways these species use their habitats show that they have different levels of temperature tolerance and specialization for certain types of habitats. N. panamintinus is a specialist of rocky mountains near the Mojave Desert, thus it needs a habitat that has cliffs or rocks next to pinyon and juniper trees that make nuts.

== Genome and genetics ==
The Panamint chipmunk, similar to other chipmunks, possesses a diploid chromosome count of 2n = 38 and displays the "karyotype B" chromosomal configuration typical of several western chipmunk species. No complete genome sequence has been published for this species. Nonetheless, molecular data, such as mitochondrial DNA, have been utilized to deduce its evolutionary relationships. Genetic research indicate that N. panamintinus has recent common ancestors with several other Neotamias chipmunks, including N. quadrimaculatus and N. minimus.

== Behavior ==
Panamint chipmunks are diurnal, engaging in foraging and navigating among rocks and plants throughout the daylight hours. They often stay close to protection, such as rocky outcrops and trees, and rarely enter open, exposed regions. Individuals are frequently seen positioned on boulders or logs while consuming seeds or monitoring for threats.

This chipmunk is predominantly solitary outside the breeding season, although exhibits social interactions within family groups, especially in terms of maternal care for the young. It demonstrates territorial behavior: adults establish and protect home territories, possibly measuring approximately one hectare or fewer, similar to related chipmunks. Intraspecific aggressiveness, characterized by fights or chases among Panamint chipmunks, has been observed in all seasons, with heightened frequency during the spring breeding time. Male individuals may vie for access to females, while both genders may safeguard optimal feeding or nesting territories. Although Panamint chipmunks can endure elevated temperatures, they limit their activity during the most severe conditions. They are classified as facultative hibernators; on extremely cold winter days or periods of snow cover, they remain in their burrows in a state of torpor. They do not undergo prolonged, continuous hibernation like certain ground squirrels; rather, they estivate or hibernate intermittently, contingent upon climatic conditions and food supply. During temperate winter days, they may surface to forage and store food for consumption when seeking refuge during winter storms. During the sweltering summer months, they may seek refuge in shade or remain inactive during the hottest part of the day, as crepuscular activity peaks are typical among desert mice.

Panamint chipmunks convey messages by vocalizations and body language characteristic of chipmunks. They produce bird-like chirps and trilling alarm cries, employing chatters or whistles during courting or territorial conflicts. Neonate chipmunks can vocalize within 24 hours of birth, and their calls are crucial for mother-offspring interactions (e.g., a separated infant will emit squeaks). The Panamint chipmunk exhibits behavior adapted to a hard environment: it remains close to shelter, forages opportunistically, and enters torpor to endure cold or drought conditions.

== Diet ==
It feeds mainly on seeds and fruits (granivorous), particularly pinyon nuts and juniper berries, but also eats willow catkins, green vegetation, insects, lichens, bark, and occasionally carrion. In captivity, individuals consumed about 4–5.5 g of food daily and were observed caching seeds for later use.

== Reproduction ==
Panamint chipmunks reproduce once a year, in a seasonal cycle. The breeding season takes place in the spring, from March to May. During this time, females become receptive and mating occurs. During this time, both men and females are looking for companions, and as we have seen, males often fight with each other over partners. It is thought that the species has a polygynous mating system, which means that one male can mate with more than one female. This is typical among chipmunks, although there haven't been many detailed field studies.

The gestation phase lasts 36 days or more post-conception. Parturition (the birth of offspring) takes place in late spring, specifically from late May to early June across the majority of its distribution. Each female typically produces a litter of approximately 3 to 6 pups, with a recorded range of 3 to 9 offspring each litter. Newborn Panamint chipmunks are altricial, characterized by being born hairless, blind (with sealed eyes and ears), and wholly reliant on the mother. The mother resides with her offspring in a protected burrow or rocky fissure supplying nourishment and warmth. Males do not engage in the rearing of offspring. After mating, only the female assumes parental responsibilities.

The puppies develop rapidly during the early summer. They are weaned at approximately 4 to 5 weeks of age, by which point they possess fur, their eyes are open, and they start to resemble little adults. The young typically first emerge from the natal burrow at approximately 5 to 6 weeks of age, going above ground in mid-summer, generally by July. At this stage, they are completely mobile and begin foraging in conjunction with the mother. The juvenile chipmunks attain independence by the conclusion of their inaugural summer; moreover, akin to other chipmunks, the young are likely to disperse or, at the very least, cache their own sustenance and enter solitary winter dormancy in their first year. Both females and males can attain sexual maturity by the subsequent breeding season (about 10 months of age) and reproduce in their initial spring as yearlings.

== Ecology ==
The Panamint chipmunk is a little mammal that lives in a harsh environment. It eats seeds and insects and is also eaten by larger animals. It serves as prey for numerous carnivorous animals in its habitat. Birds of prey (such hawks and owls), tiny raptors, and carnivorous mammals are all known or likely predators. Coyotes (Canis latrans), red foxes (Vulpes spp.), gray foxes (Urocyon cinereoargenteus), bobcats (Lynx rufus), and weasels (Mustela spp.) are all good at catching chipmunks. Birds of prey, especially big hawks and owls, will take the chance to catch chipmunks. Panamint chipmunks rely on their strange looks, ability to move quickly between rocks, and alarm calls to warn of predators that are about to attack.

As seed dispersers, Panamint chipmunks are very important to the health of ecosystems. By moving and storing pinyon pine seeds and other nuts, they unknowingly assist these trees spread; seeds that aren't consumed could sprout, which would help the forest grow back. Thus, they exert a little positive influence on the preservation of their woodland habitat through seed dispersion, which has been recognized as indirectly advantageous to humans by supporting pinyon forests that produce resources.

The Panamint chipmunk shares its habitat with a range of other species adapted to the Mojave and Great Basin transition zone. It coexists with other chipmunk species in certain locations, for example in the Spring Mountains of Nevada, it inhabits lower elevations, but the Palmer's chipmunk (Neotamias palmeri) resides at higher elevations. The two species are delimited by habitat zones and maybe by competitive interactions. Likewise, as previously stated, it coexists with the least chipmunk with limited overlap owing to unique habitat preferences. Neotamias panamintinus is not considered an invasive species, it is still only found in its original range and has not been moved to other places.

== Conservation status ==
The International Union for Conservation of Nature categorizes Neotamias panamintinus as Least Concern, indicating steady populations and extensive distribution. The majority of its distribution is situated within federally protected areas. However, prospective threats encompass wildfires, habitat fragmentation, and the deterioration of pinyon-juniper woods attributable to climate change. For instance, in the southwestern US, low-elevation pinyon pines and junipers have died because of rising temperatures and drought stress. Climate change could hurt piyon-juniper woodlands, which could make the Panamint chipmunk's home smaller or break it up. The driest and hottest parts of the Great Basin and Mojave region have seen up to 50% of their pinyon pine populations collapse because of the heat and dryness.

== Research and studies ==
Most of the research on the chipmunk focused on its reproductive biology, development, physiology, and ecological connections. J. R. Hirshfeld conducted an extensive study on Panamint chipmunk's reproduction, growth, and development in Nevada in 1975. He recorded the traits of the litter and the rates of growth. Hirshfeld and W. G. Bradley (1977) undertook a comparative study on the growth and developmental trajectories of Panamint chipmunks and Palmer's chipmunks, highlighting the differences in growth rates between these closely related species. However, the Panamint chipmunk is still one of the least-studied tiny mammals in California overall.
