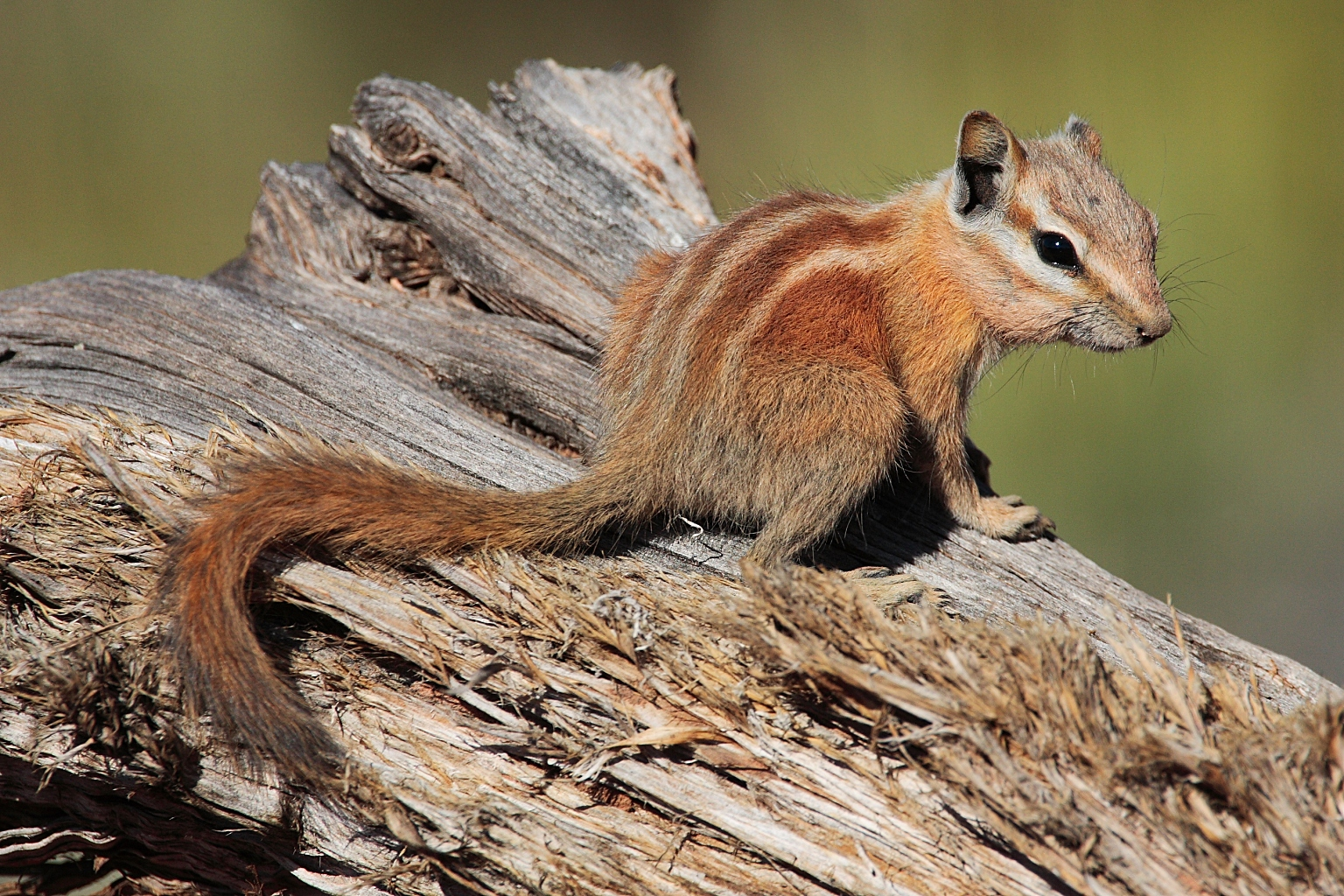

Conservation status
- Least Concern (IUCN 3.1)

Scientific classification
- Kingdom: Animalia
- Phylum: Chordata
- Class: Mammalia
- Order: Rodentia
- Family: Sciuridae
- Genus: Neotamias
- Species: N. rufus

Binomial name
- Neotamias rufus (Hoffmeister & Ellis, 1979)

Synonyms
- Eutamias quadrivittatus rufus Hoffmeister and Ellis, 1979; Tamias rufus (Hoffmeister & Ellis, 1979)

= Hopi chipmunk =

Species of rodent

The Hopi chipmunk (Neotamias rufus) is a small chipmunk found in Colorado, Utah and Arizona in the southwestern United States. It was previously grouped with the Colorado chipmunk (N. quadrivittatus). This species is listed as "Least Concern" on the IUCN Red List as it is common, widespread, and without any major threats. It was last evaluated in 2016.

== Description ==
This species is distinguished by somewhat smaller size and a dorsal pelage that generally lacks significant amounts of black in the stripes, resulting in a more orange red to buff pelage. Measurements are: total length 190–235 mm; length of tail 83–95 mm; length of hindfoot 31–35 mm; length of ear 15–22 mm; weight 52–62 g. Females are slightly larger than males.

== Habitat ==
Hopi chipmunks prefer rocky areas with pinion and juniper pines and feed mostly on nuts, seeds and fruits. Food gathered is stored in cheek pouches and taken elsewhere for consumption or storage. They nest in rock piles or crevices. This is the common chipmunk of much of the canyon and slickrock piñon-juniper country in western Colorado. Population densities appear to be highest in areas with an abundance of broken rock or rubble at the base of cliff faces or in rock formations with deep fissures and crevices suitable for den sites.

In Colorado, the Hopi chipmunk occurs in the west from the Yampa River south. It ranges eastward along the Colorado River to Eagle County and along the Gunnison to the western end of the Black Canyon.

== Diet ==
The diet includes seeds of Indian ricegrass and penstemon are eagerly sought as are seeds of junipers, piñon, oak, skunkbrush, and other shrubs.

== Behavior ==
Hopi chipmunks are naturally timid, and even individuals born in captivity never become tame. Like Panamint chipmunks, they live in southwestern pinyon-juniper forests and nest in rock crevices or piles of broken rock. They are fast and sure-footed on the sheer rock faces of canyons and buttes. They often climb into shrubs to get seeds, but never eat there: either they take the food to the safety of their den, or perch on a boulder or other lookout where they can eat but at the same time watch for hawks or other predators.
