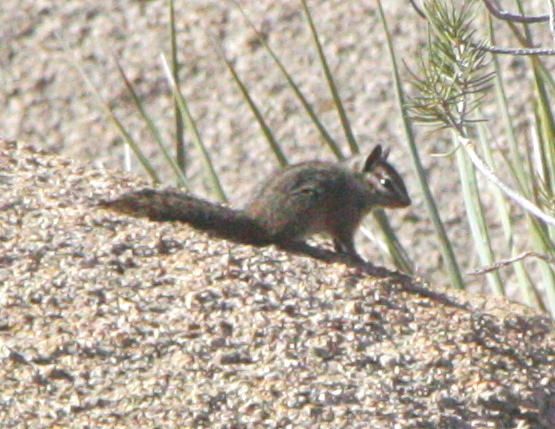

Conservation status
- Least Concern (IUCN 3.1)

Scientific classification
- Kingdom: Animalia
- Phylum: Chordata
- Class: Mammalia
- Order: Rodentia
- Family: Sciuridae
- Genus: Neotamias
- Species: N. obscurus

Binomial name
- Neotamias obscurus (J. A. Allen, 1890)

Synonyms
- Tamias obscurus J. A. Allen, 1890

= California chipmunk =

Species of rodent

The California chipmunk or chaparral chipmunk (Neotamias obscurus) is a species of rodent in the squirrel family Sciuridae. It is found in Baja California, Mexico, and in southern California in the United States.
