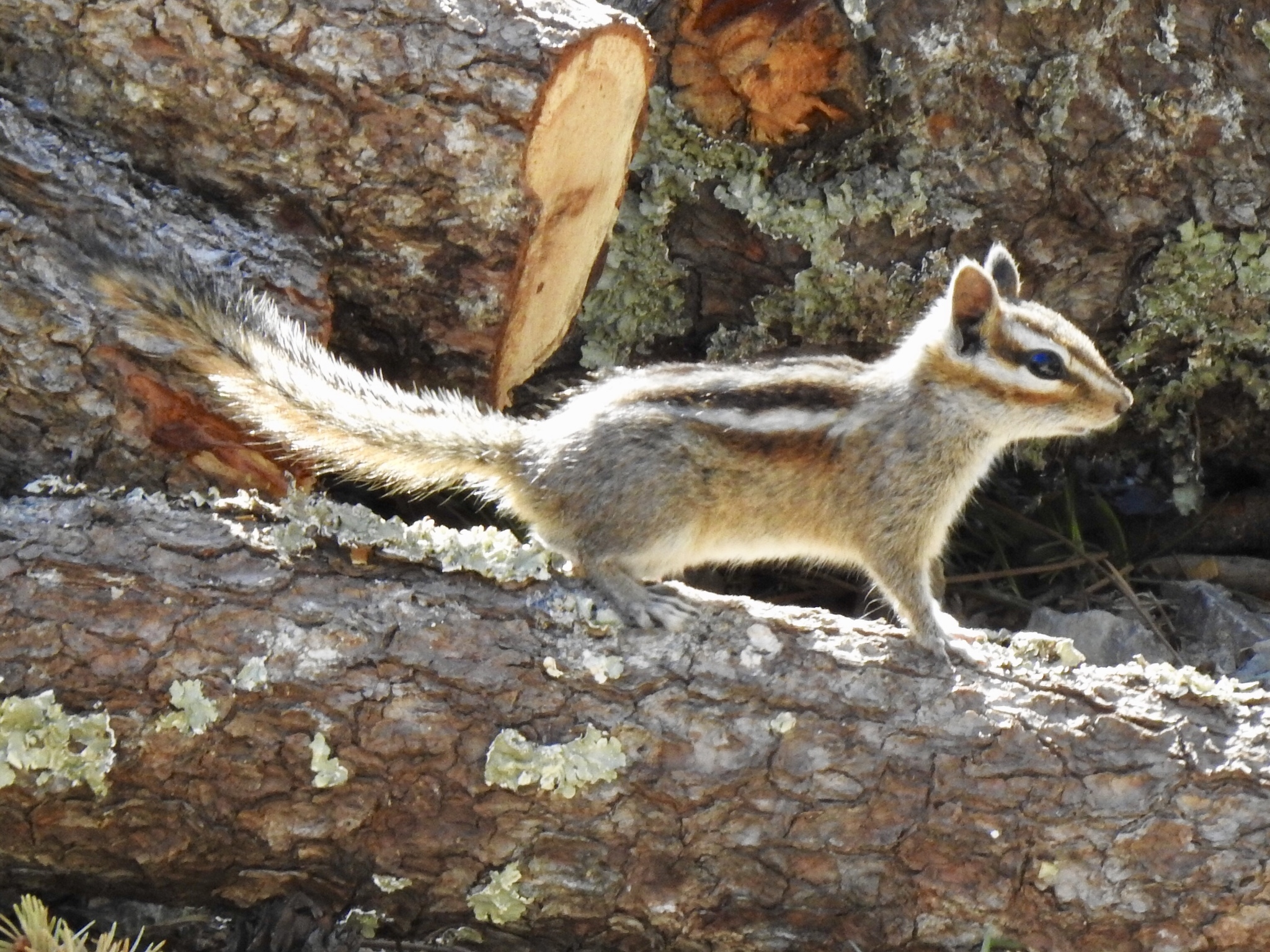
- Grey-footed chipmunk on fallen logs

Conservation status
- Least Concern (IUCN 3.1)

Scientific classification
- Kingdom: Animalia
- Phylum: Chordata
- Class: Mammalia
- Order: Rodentia
- Family: Sciuridae
- Genus: Neotamias
- Species: N. canipes

Binomial name
- Neotamias canipes (V. O. Bailey, 1902)
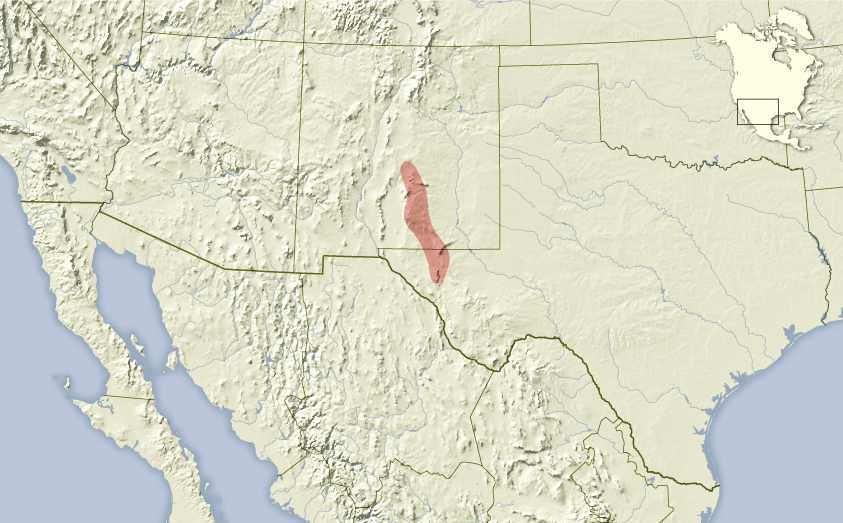

Synonyms
- Tamias canipes V. O. Bailey, 1902

= Gray-footed chipmunk =

Species of rodent in the family Sciuridae

The gray-footed chipmunk (Neotamias canipes) is a terrestrial and forest-dwelling species of chipmunk and rodent in the family Sciuridae. It is endemic to New Mexico and in the Sierra Diablo and Guadalupe Mountains in the Trans-Pecos region of Texas in the United States. Its natural habitat are coniferous forests. First discovered in 1902, they are distinguished by the unique gray dorsal colouring on the hind feet, hence the common name. They demonstrate sexual dimorphism, and the female is larger than the male.

== Taxonomy ==
The species name comes from the Latin cantitia, meaning "gray in color", and pes, meaning "foot", and the genus name comes from the Greek word Tamias, meaning "a distributor".

N. canipes was formerly considered a subspecies of N. cinereicollis, the gray-collared chipmunk, but it was brought to species status in 1960.

There are two distinguished subspecies of N. canipes:

- Neotamias canipes canipes, first distinguished as a subspecies of N. canipes in 1960, the type locality of N. canipes being N. c. canipes.
- Neotamias canipes sacramentoensis, type locality found in the Sacramento Mountains of New Mexico at an elevation of 2,743 m (8,999 ft). It was first distinguished as a subspecies in 1960. The distribution range is smaller than that of N. c. canipes. The baculum has a short shaft than N. c. canipes of 3.23 mm (0.127 in), with a wide base; angle of the shaft and tip between 112 and 121°.

== Description ==
The gray-footed chipmunk is commonly distinguished by the dorsal gray colouration of the hind feet, hence the common name. Pelage is grayish; the lateral sides of the head marked with five brown and four white stripes. Only three brown and two white stripes are found on the lateral sides of the body; there are also black or brown stripes on the back. The dorsal face of the tail is coloured black, and the underside reddish brown. The abdominal region of the pelage is white. They are bilaterally symmetric. Winter pelage bears similarity to summer, with the exception of more gray colour on the dorsal and paler tone on the lateral sides.

Gray-footed chipmunks experience sexual dimorphism, and the female is larger than the male. This is commonly seen in many species of chipmunks.

Because the gray-footed chipmunk physical characteristics vary in different mountain ranges, their weight is commonly between 65 and 75 g (2.3 and 2.6 oz). In the Sacramento Mountains, the total length varies between 227 and 264 mm (8.9 and 10.4 in), hind foot length ranging between 34 and 36 mm, and tail length between 91 and 108 mm (3.6 and 4.3 in). However, in the Guadalupe Mountains of Texas and the White Mountains of New Mexico, total length varies between 210 and 250 mm (8.3 and 9.8 in), hind foot length ranging 32 to 35 mm (1.3 to 1.4 in), and tail length between 92 and 115 mm (3.6 and 4.5 in).

The dental formula of the gray-footed chipmunk is $\frac{1.0.2.3}{1.0.1.3}$, meaning they have two incisors, no canines, four premolars, and six molars for the upper teeth. Lower teeth are identical except for only having two premolars. They have 22 teeth in total.

The chipmunk has a karyotype of "A".

== Distribution and habitat ==
Trans-Pecos region on Texas map

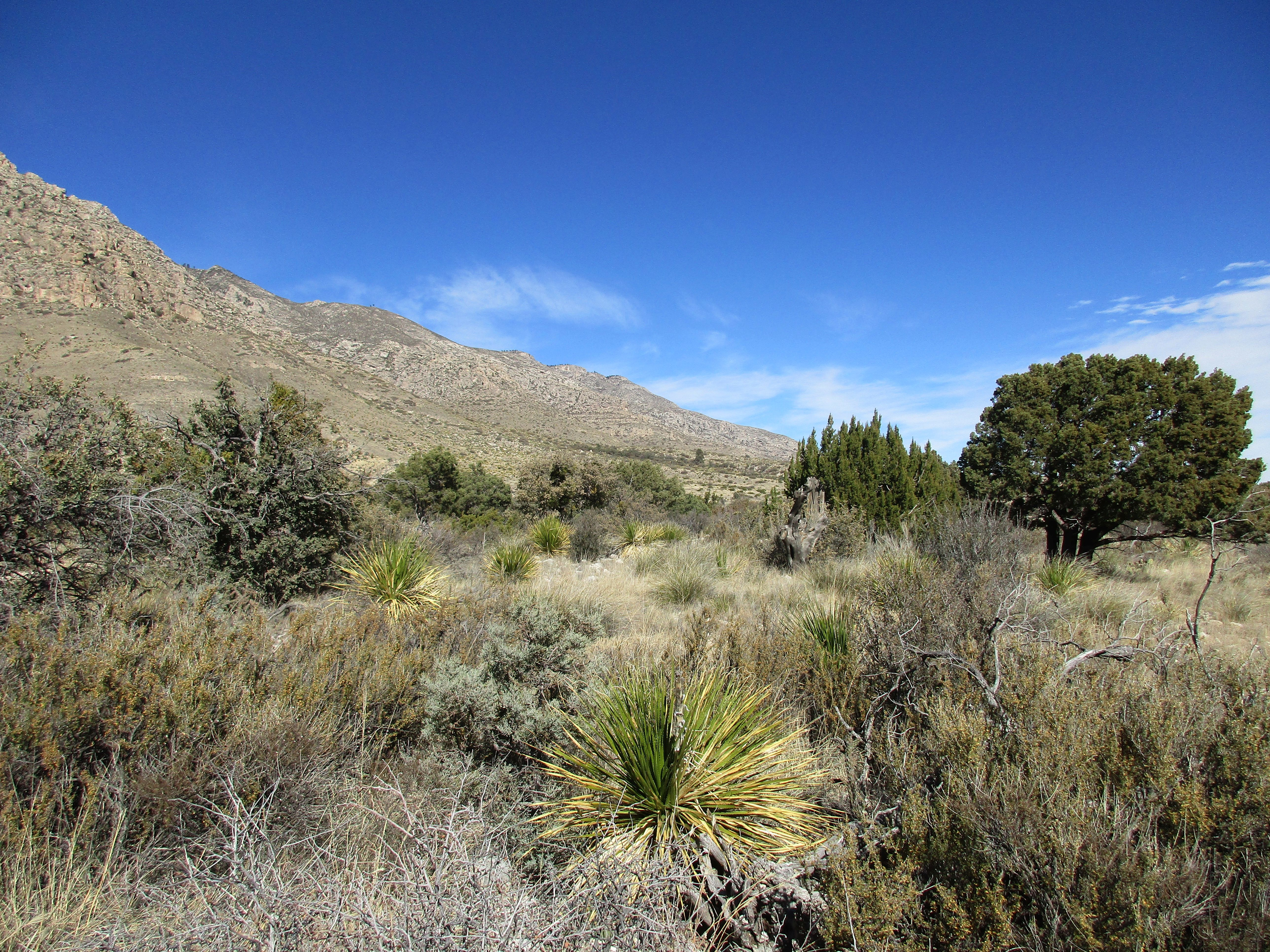
The Guadalupe Mountains of Texas

Gray-footed chipmunks are native to the southeastern mountain ranges of New Mexico such as the Sacramento, Gallinas, and Jicarilla. They are also to mountain ranges in Texas such as the Guadalupe in the Trans-Pecos region. The chipmunks are found primarily at elevations of 1,600 to 3,600 m (5,200 to 11,800 ft), but have been recorded at lower elevations. The type locality was found in the Guadalupe Mountains, 2,133 m (6,998 ft) above sea level.

The preferred habitat of the gray-footed chipmunk are coniferous forests with an abundance of pines and firs, pinyon-juniper woodlands, and rocky hillsides. For nesting and to avoid predation, they prefer areas with an abundance of fallen trees and rock crevices.

The size of the gray-footed chipmunk territory has not been reported, but few species of chipmunks have territories exceeding one hectare (2.5 acres). It is suspected that the territory of the gray-footed chipmunk ranges from 0.2 to 4.0 hectares (0.5 to 9.9 acres). It is likely that the chipmunks are territorial and somewhat sedentary.

Global populations of the chipmunk are unknown, however it is thought that the number most likely exceeds 100,000 individuals.

== Diet ==
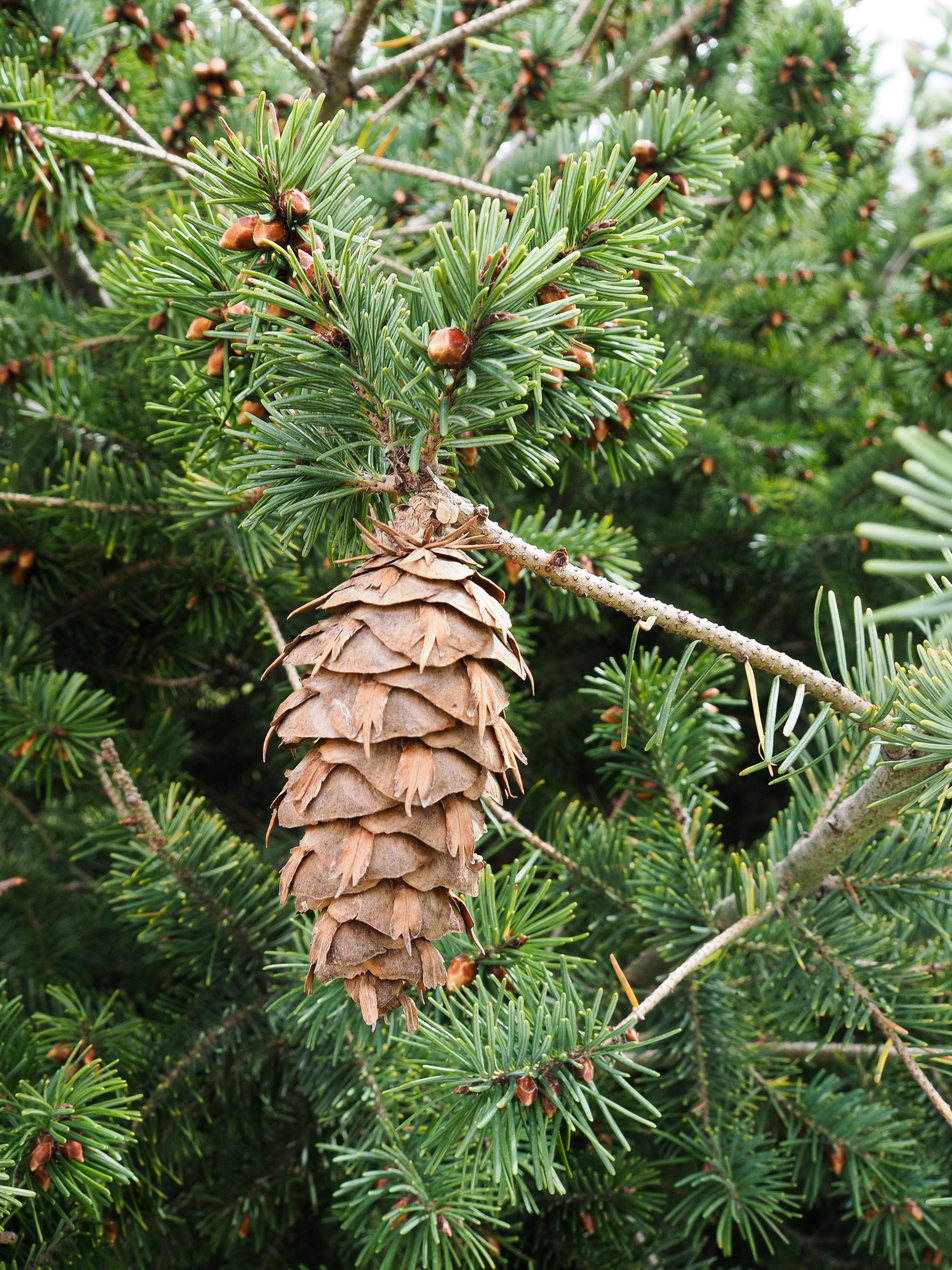
Douglas-fir cones

Gray-footed chipmunks are omnivorous, their diet consisting of acorns, seeds of Douglas fir, gooseberries, mushrooms, juniper berries, and insects. In late summer and autumn, gray-footed chipmunks consume primarily acorns for hibernation, but do not usually gain weight. Instead, they rely on caches of acorns and other seeds (Abies, Picea, Pinus) to survive the winter.

=== Predation ===
Many carnivores including northern goshawks are predators to the gray-footed chipmunk, as well as other raptors. When threatened, the chipmunk will seek protection in rock crevices and burrows, the colour of its fur allows it to camouflage somewhat. They have been found to climb trees to seek protection.

== Breeding ==
Females deliver a litter of around four young annually, between mid-May through August. Little else is known of their breeding habits; however, they are most likely similar to those of other species of Neotamias. It is likely that they breed polygynously. After emerging from hibernation, females undergo estrus in the spring. Usually, gestation lasts for one month. Lactation typically lasts one to two months, however this varies across Neotamias species. Males do not provide parental care; the female will raise her young in a burrow or nest until they can survive on their own. In late April, young typically gain their independence and are capable of breeding the following year. Young are typically mature in early Autumn.

== Behaviour ==
The gray-footed chipmunk is diurnal and is mostly active shortly after dawn, when they feed and forage. The chipmunk is primarily terrestrial, and are generally found in rock crevices and fallen logs. They tend to seek protection among rock crevices and thick brush, but have also been found to climb trees.

The chipmunks will engage in torpor during the winter, but unlike most hibernating mammals, they do not gain extra weight to survive the winter and rely on caches of acorns and other seeds to sustain themselves. They are heterothermic endotherms, meaning that body temperature decreases in the winter during hibernation, and body temperature increases during the summer. They are also homeothermic endotherms due to the relative stability of their body temperatures during the winter hibernation and the summer activity.

=== Communication ===
Communication in gray-footed chipmunks between individuals is achieved through chipping sounds. These sounds are describes as a "chipper" or a "chuck-chuck-chuck". They remain silent when threatened, but they do have an alarm call like a higher pitched "chipper" sound due to the vocalization peaks' short intervals. Not much is known about the chipmunk's body communication, but other members of Neotamias communicate via tail and body position.

== See also ==
- Neotamias
- Sciuridae
- Yellow-pine chipmunk
- Red-tailed chipmunk
