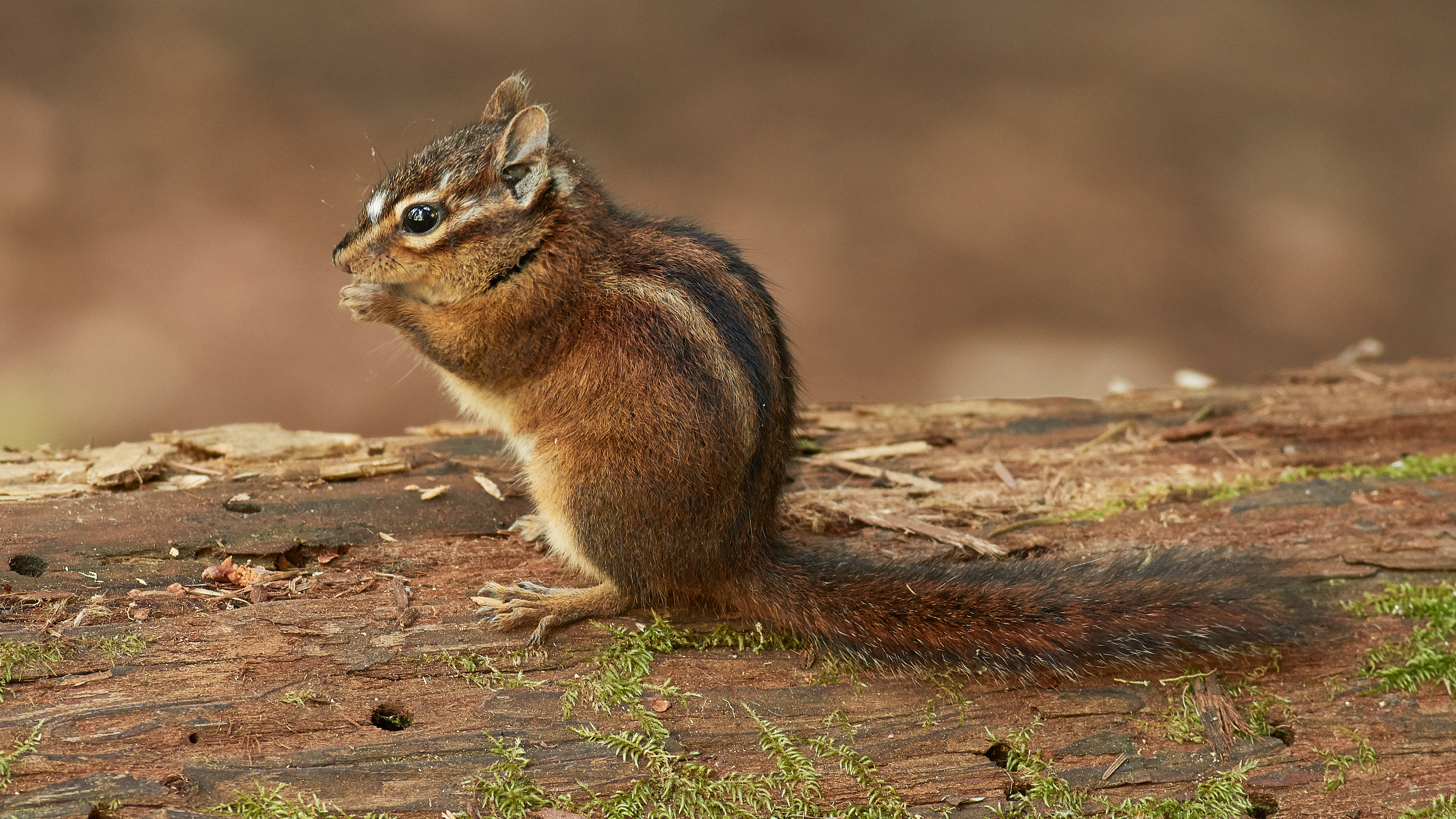

Conservation status
- Least Concern (IUCN 3.1)

Scientific classification
- Kingdom: Animalia
- Phylum: Chordata
- Class: Mammalia
- Order: Rodentia
- Family: Sciuridae
- Genus: Neotamias
- Species: N. sonomae

Binomial name
- Neotamias sonomae (Grinnell, 1915)
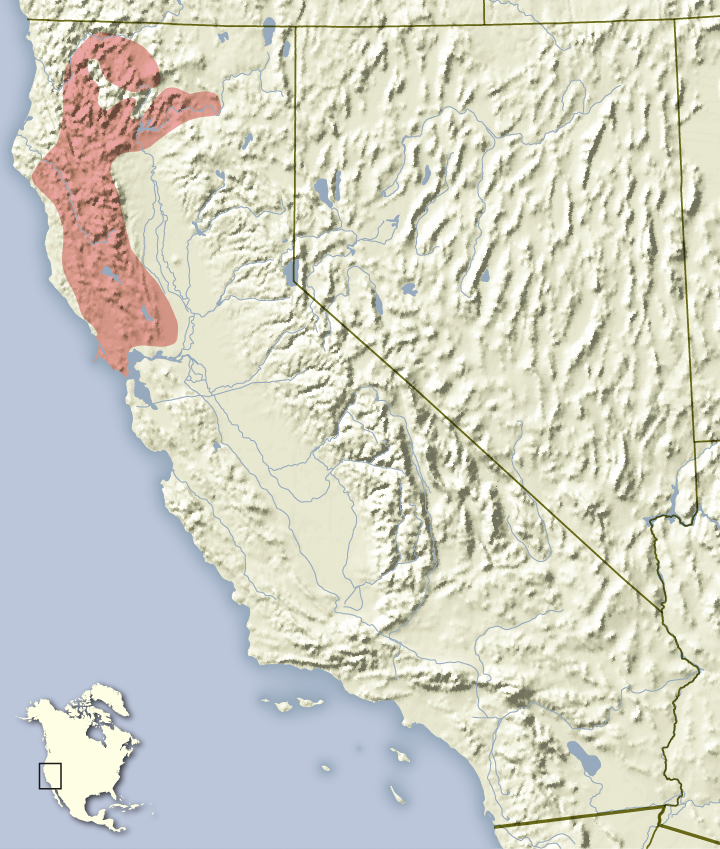
- Distribution of Neotamias sonomae

Synonyms
- Tamias sonomae (Grinnell, 1915); Eutamias sonomae Grinnell, 1915

= Sonoma chipmunk =

Species of rodent

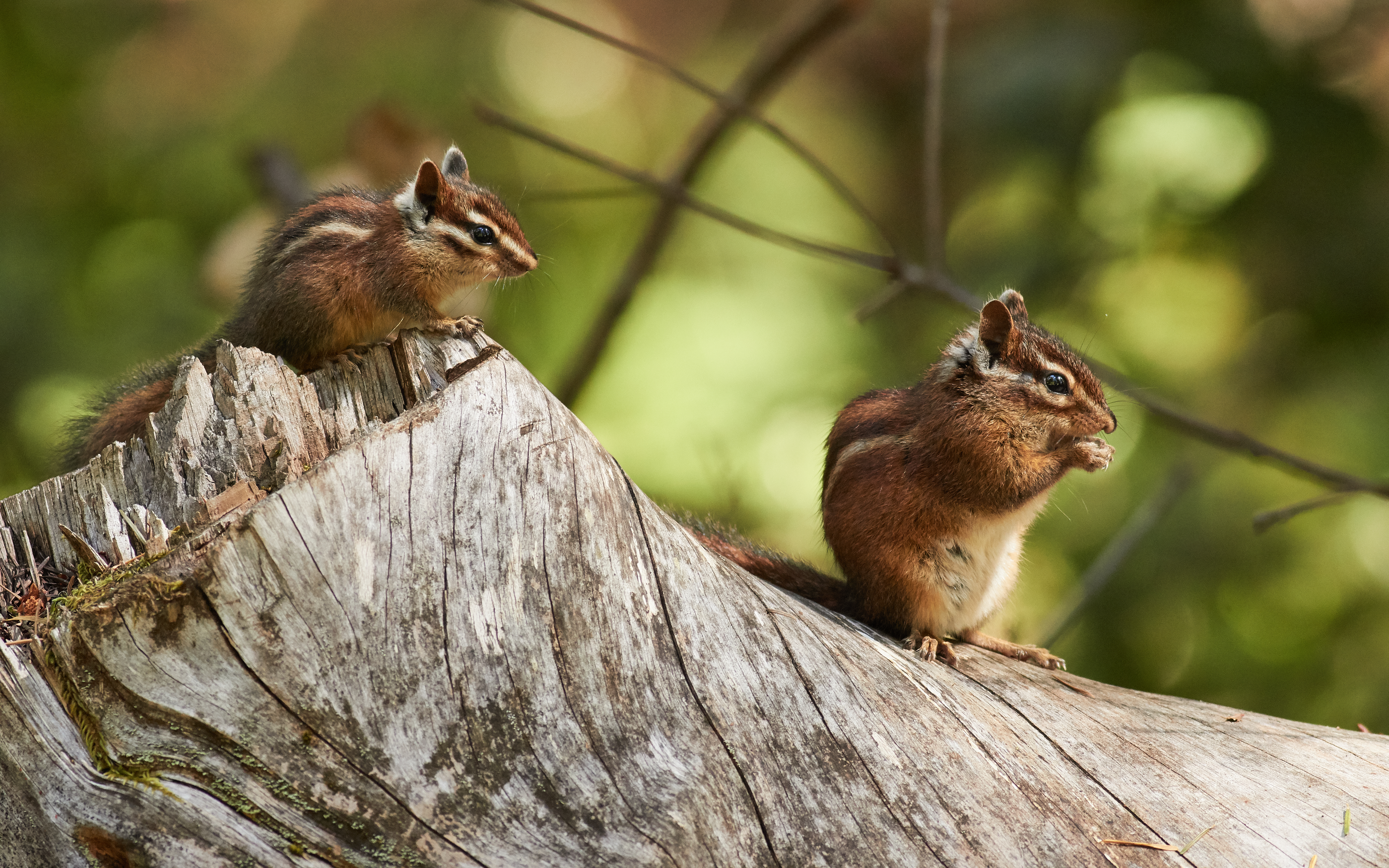
Sonoma chipmunk, juvenile (left) and adult (right)

The Sonoma chipmunk (Neotamias sonomae) is a species of rodent in the squirrel family Sciuridae. It is endemic to northwestern California in the United States. Members of Neotamias are characterized by having two premolars. N. sonomae has two subspecies: N. s. alleni and N. s. sonomae.

== Distribution ==
The Sonoma chipmunk is only found in California, north of the San Francisco Bay. Most of its range is within Sonoma and Marin counties.

== Habitat ==
Sonoma chipmunks are found in areas of forest or chaparral. They can be found in forests of sticky laurel, Ponderosa pine, Douglas fir, spruce, redwood, and black oak. They are more often than not associated with coniferous forests. The chaparral that Sonoma chipmunks inhabit is characterized by sagebrush plains. Sonoma chipmunks are found in elevations from 0 to 1,800 m (5,900 ft). These chipmunks typically live on the ground and make burrows in the ground, but they can climb and may make nests in trees.

== Physical characteristics ==
=== Body ===
The Sonoma chipmunk has a total body length (including tail) ranging 220–264 mm (8.7–10.4 in). Tail length ranges 100–126 mm (3.9–5.0 in), hind foot (pes) length is 34–39 mm (1.3–1.5 in), and ear flap (pinna) length is 15–19 mm (0.59–0.75 in). The Sonoma chipmunk weighs 25–125 grams (0.88–4.41 oz), and thus is a small mammal in size.

=== Color ===
These chipmunks have five black/brown stripes running the length of their body with white stripes in between. The rest of the dorsal and ventral parts of the body range from tawny to cinnamon to gray. The tail is edged in white. The belly is grayish white. Sonoma chipmunks have two molts per year, having a summer and winter pelage. The winter pelage is generally slightly darker and duller than the summer pelage. N. s. alleni is smaller and darker than N. s. sonomae. There is no distinct sexual dimorphism.

=== Gender differences ===
Both males and females share similar external features, exhibiting no apparent sexual dimorphism. These chipmunks are characterized by five black longitudinal back stripes separated by four dull gray or brownish stripes. Unique to the Sonoma chipmunk, these back stripes aren't clearly demarcated, which aids in its camouflage within the chaparral habitat. The upper parts of the chipmunk display a reddish-brown hue, except for a black patch behind each eye and whitish stripes beside them. The sides are rusty-colored, while the underside is creamy white. Their bushy tail mirrors the body's coloration. The fur is soft, dense, and becomes slightly woolly during winter. Seasonal changes lead to two molts each year, with the summer fur being brighter than the winter one.

=== Subspecies ===
There are two subspecies of the Sonoma chipmunk; T. s. alleni and T. s. sonomae, the former being slightly smaller and darker in fur color. Structurally, the chipmunk's skull is long and narrow, with distinct features like a deep rostrum, separated nasals, and a long, inflated braincase. It has a total of 22 teeth, with specific characteristics in its upper incisors and cheek teeth. The baculum, or penile bone, has a thin shaft and features a low keel, with a specific angle and design at the tip.

=== Structure ===
The skulls of Sonoma chipmunks have the distinct post orbital process that is found in all sciurids. The skull has a deep rostrum, a long braincase, and small incisive foramina. The incisors are curved and pincer-like, and the molars are simple and cuspidate. The dental formula for N. sonomae is 1.0.2.31.0.1.3 × 2 = 22.

== Diet and behavior ==
Sonoma chipmunks typically forage on the ground or climb along small branches in brush. They eat seeds, fruits, herbs, buds of woody plants, as well as insects and bird eggs, and primarily consume the reproductive products of shrubs. Food is collected in their cheek pouches and stored in their burrows. These chipmunks will find elevated places to eat and rest so they can watch the surrounding area for predators. Sonoma chipmunks have high-pitched, bird-like alarm calls that are distinct from other chipmunks and are emitted in response to potential threats. Females are usually the ones to make alarm calls. These alarm calls likely evolved due to kin selection, as the chipmunks nearby that hear the alarm calls are typically related to the individual making the alarm call. When an alarm call is heard, the chipmunk will quickly move along a direct path to a covered, protected area and become still. These chipmunks undergo torpor in winter but arise periodically to eat from their food cache, since they do not accumulate fat stores. Sonoma chipmunks may also hibernate in winter, and they don't have migratory patterns. They are also diurnal animals, meaning they are active during the day time and inactive or have periods of rest during the night time.

== Predator/competition ==
Sonoma chipmunks may be preyed upon by long-tailed weasels, bobcats, badgers, gray foxes, and various hawks and owls. They may also compete for resources and food against T. amoenus, T. ochrogenys, and T. senex chipmunks, and mule deer, black bears, wild pigs, turkeys, California quail, and various other rodents, birds, and insects.

== Diseases ==
Sonoma Chipmunks from the northern coastal region of California are more susceptible to pathogen infection than those from the Sierra Nevada, as indicated in earlier regional studies on vector-borne zoonotic diseases in California chipmunks. Sonoma chipmunks are often exposed to agents of Lyme disease and anaplasmosis in regions where humans also have recorded infections. Chipmunks were also identified as hosts of various Rickettsia spp. and plague, with certain variations observed based on geographical regions and chipmunk species. One particular scientific journal noted that between 2005 and 2015, 709 chipmunks across nine species in California were tested for various vector-borne zoonotic pathogens; the results revealed varying levels of exposure to and infection by pathogens like Borrelia spp., Anaplasma phagocytophilum, and SFG Rickettsia spp. across different regions and species, suggesting certain chipmunk populations and areas are more susceptible to certain diseases. This emphasizes the ecological significance of chipmunks in the maintenance and transmission of various diseases in California and highlights the need for further research to elucidate the specific roles of different chipmunk species in disease ecology.

== Reproduction ==
Sonoma chipmunks breed once per year, anywhere from February to July, but most often in April to May. There is occasionally a second breeding season for females if their first litter is lost. Gestation lasts for 28–36 days. 3–5 young are produced per litter, but it is usually 4.

The babies are weaned after approximately 3 weeks, and the mother stops associating with them after they are weaned. The juveniles stay together for a few more weeks after their mother leaves. After this, the juveniles disperse. Males disperse in a larger range than females. Juveniles reach sexual maturity within one year, and the lifespan of these chipmunks is around 64 months. Females have higher survivorship and live longer than males.

There is a 1:1 ratio of males to females when the juveniles disperse in spring. By the end of the year, this ratio favors females due to the higher risk of mortality in the wider ranging males. However, the ratio again becomes 1:1 by the fall of their second year of life, as first-year adult females have a high risk of mortality during their first breeding attempt. Over time, the ratio will once again favor females.

Typically, females raise a litter by themselves. Through their offspring's early age, the females stay with their young and suckle them for at least 3 weeks after they emerge. Especially during the night, females protect their litters from predators and traps. In addition, depicted by an experiment and extrapolated to real life scenarios, adult female chipmunks gave alarms (emergency warnings) significantly more often than adult males, which speaks to their protective and more alerted nature. Another statistics show that lactating first year females gave alarms less often than did older lactating females, meaning that as female Sonoma chipmunks age, they become more alert due to their protectiveness over their offsprings.

== Deviation from other chipmunks ==
Sonoma chipmunks's reproduction rate is slightly higher compared to other similar chipmunks like yellow-pine chipmunks. Sonoma chipmunks tend to produce 3–5 per litter while yellow-pine chipmunks produce 2 litters per year. Consequently, the population structure is more consistently distributed across the age groups for Sonoma chipmunks, whereas for yellow-pine chipmunks, adults form the majority of the population.

The related yellow-pine chipmunk and the Townsend's chipmunk can be distinguished by several anatomical characteristics. The yellow-pine chipmunk is smaller and less red than N. sonomae and lacks a white-fringed tail. N. sonomae can be distinguished from the Townsend's chipmunk by having longer ears, tail, and legs, being paler, and having a bushier tail.
