= Crater chipmunk =

Scientific classification
- Kingdom: Animalia
- Phylum: Chordata
- Class: Mammalia
- Order: Rodentia
- Family: Sciuridae
- Genus: Neotamias
- Species: N. cratericus

Binomial name
- Neotamias cratericus (Blossom, 1937)

Species of rodent

The crater chipmunk (Neotamias cratericus) is a species of chipmunk native to the coniferous forests of southern Idaho, north of the Snake River Plain. It was formerly considered a subspecies of Neotamias amoenus. It is named after the Craters of the Moon National Monument, where the holotype of this species was first collected.

== Description ==
This species averages around 21 cm (8.3 inches) long, with the tail being 9.7 cm (3.8 inches) of this length. This species resembles N. amoenus, but is overall slightly darker.
