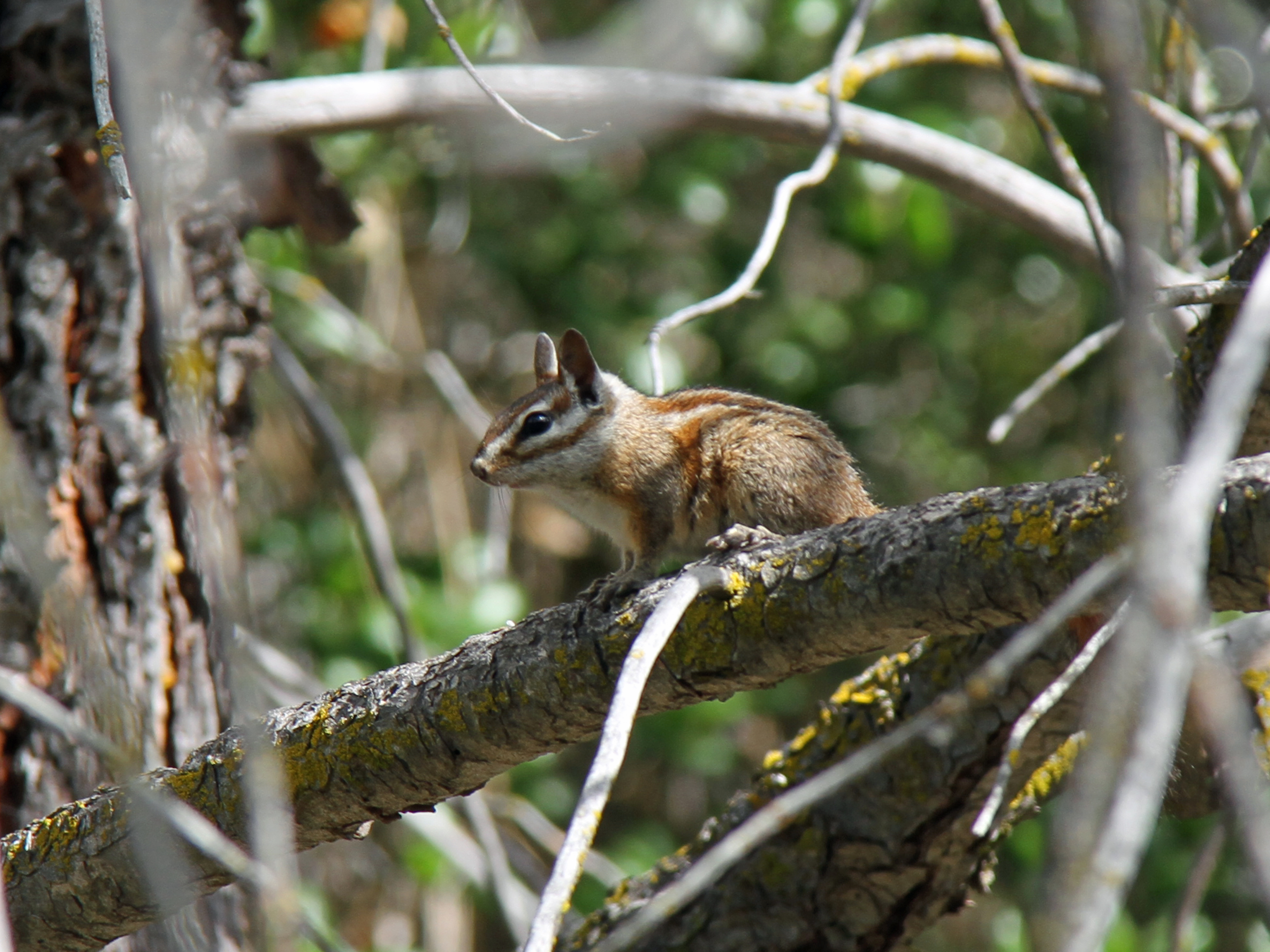

Conservation status
- Least Concern (IUCN 3.1)

Scientific classification
- Kingdom: Animalia
- Phylum: Chordata
- Class: Mammalia
- Order: Rodentia
- Family: Sciuridae
- Genus: Neotamias
- Species: N. merriami

Binomial name
- Neotamias merriami (J. A. Allen, 1889)

Synonyms
- Tamias merriami J. A. Allen, 1889

= Merriam's chipmunk =

Species of rodent

Merriam's chipmunk (Neotamias merriami) is a species of chipmunk in the family Sciuridae. It is found in central and southern California in the United States and a small area in northern Baja California, Mexico.

== Description ==
Its fur is grayish-brown, with dark and light-colored dorsal stripes. It has light gray or white stripes around the eyes and a white underbelly. The tail is very bushy, often measuring over 80% of the head and body length. They experience molting of the fur on their bodies and tails.

The dental formula for Tamias merriami is 1.0.2.3.1.0.1.3. × 2 = 22

== Distribution and habitat ==
The Merriam's chipmunk lives in parts of central and southern California and Baja California, including along the western slope of the Sierra Nevada mountains. They have been observed at altitudes of up to 2,940 meters but most often live at elevations under 1,200 meters. They primarily inhabit forests and chaparral-covered shrubland habitats. They live in areas with a variety of trees, shrubs, logs, rocks, and plant litter, which are features utilized for their food and shelter.

== Diet ==
The merriam's chipmunk has a mainly herbivorous diet. It forages daily for food and carries seeds or acorns in its cheek pouches, often to be cached in the ground. Acorns are a major part of its diet, especially from valley oak trees. Other sources of food include the seeds, nuts, and berries of a variety of plants, insects, and larvae.

== Reproduction ==
When mating, females attract males by calling to them. The duration of the female call is ten to fifteen minutes. A male will hear the call and respond to it by running to and jumping around the female. The female then squats down, and the male performs 12-24 thrusts. The entire process of mating lasts about fifteen seconds.
