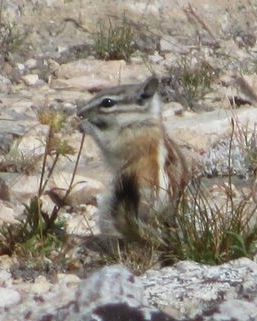

Conservation status
- Least Concern (IUCN 3.1)

- Apparently Secure (NatureServe)

Scientific classification
- Kingdom: Animalia
- Phylum: Chordata
- Class: Mammalia
- Order: Rodentia
- Family: Sciuridae
- Genus: Neotamias
- Species: N. alpinus

Binomial name
- Neotamias alpinus (Merriam, 1893)

Synonyms
- Tamias alpinus Merriam, 1893

= Alpine chipmunk =

Species of rodent

The alpine chipmunk (Neotamias alpinus) is a species of chipmunk native to the high elevations of the Sierra Nevada of California. No significant threats to the species are known.

== Description ==
Alpine chipmunks share the typical pattern of genus Neotamias, being gray-brown overall and featuring three white stripes on the cheeks and four down the back. The flanks are muted orange. They weigh 27-45 grams and grow from 166 to 203 mm. Overall the alpine chipmunk is much paler and smaller compared to others in its genus. Their typical lifespan in the wild is up to 2-3 years.

== Distribution and habitat ==
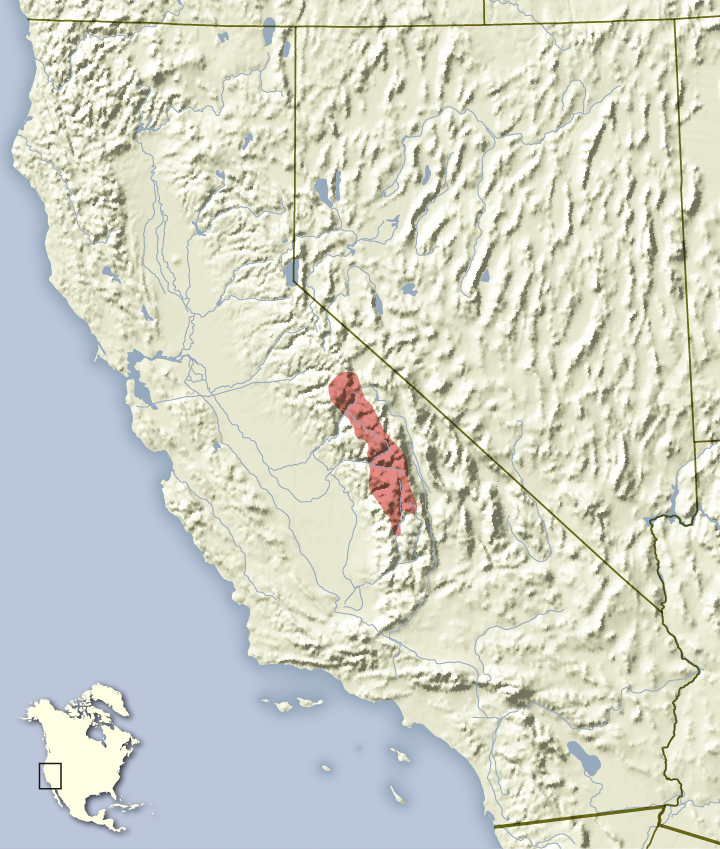
Distribution of Alpine chipmunk

Alpine chipmunks only live in high Sierra Nevada, from Yosemite National Park in the north, to Olancha Peak in the south. They have been observed at altitudes from around 2,300 meters (7,500 ft) to 3,900 meters (12,800 ft), though they rarely occur below 2,500 meters (8,200 ft). They primarily inhabit the talus slopes and sub-alpine forests, where there is a large accumulation of loose, rocky debris. During the summer, where the high-elevation environment becomes increasingly arid and warm, the alpine chipmunk utilize these rocks by retreating into the cool, deep crevices of boulders to regulate their body temperature.

== Feeding ==
The alpine chipmunk feeds on the seeds of sedges, grasses, and other plants in their namesake alpine zone. Some examples are the bitter cherry (Prunus emarginata), currant (Ribes), blueberries and huckleberries (Vaccinium), and their most common source of food, pussy-paws (Spraguea umbellate). The alpine chipmunk conserves their water by concentrating their urine, so they do not generally require a source of water other than food, but will use it given the opportunity. When food is scarce, intraspecific competition is observed to take place.

== Behavior ==
The alpine chipmunk is extremely agile, being able to skip around from place to place while conducting its daily activities. Usually while running, they are observed to straighten out their tails vertically in order to appear larger and longer to ward off predators and competition amongst other alpine chipmunks. Predators of the alpine chipmunk include raptors, weasels, coyotes, foxes, and bobcats. Socially, alpine chipmunks are more reserved compared to their relatives. When provoked, they respond with little to no notes at all, while other species tend to react with loud and frequent notes.

== Reproduction ==
Their young are born in June and July, in litters of 3–6. Females give their kits milk and after around 30 to 45 days, the kits (baby squirrels) weigh about 28 to 50 grams. After 90 days, kits are the same weight and size as adults. Towards the end of winter and early spring, mating occurs.

== Hibernation ==
They are considered diurnal (active during the day), though they exhibit some nocturnal activity during the summer. During late July and August, they gain a lot of weight to prepare for hibernation under snowpacks which are like heating pads. They hibernate from November through April, frequently awakening to eat. Their cheeks can triple in size because they are on the hunt for food and store what is in their mouth to the burrow which can be up to eight pounds. This is because they don't want to go out in the harsh conditions of the winter so they store everything before their hibernation which is like a meal preparation for the week for the alpine chipmunks.

== Conservation status ==
As of the last assessment on January 21, 2016 made by the IUCN, the alpine chipmunk is listed as Least Concern. Despite its restricted range in population, their numbers are stable and have little to no fluctuation.

However, threats to the alpine chipmunk still exist. Because their primary habitats are forests and rocky areas, recent human activity and climate change have forced the species to slowly move to higher elevations as the quality and extent of their habitat decreases. Climate change can produce broken populations especially because the alpine chipmunks live on high altitudes in the mountains. These chipmunks also do not live in any protected areas, which can pose a danger to their survivability.
