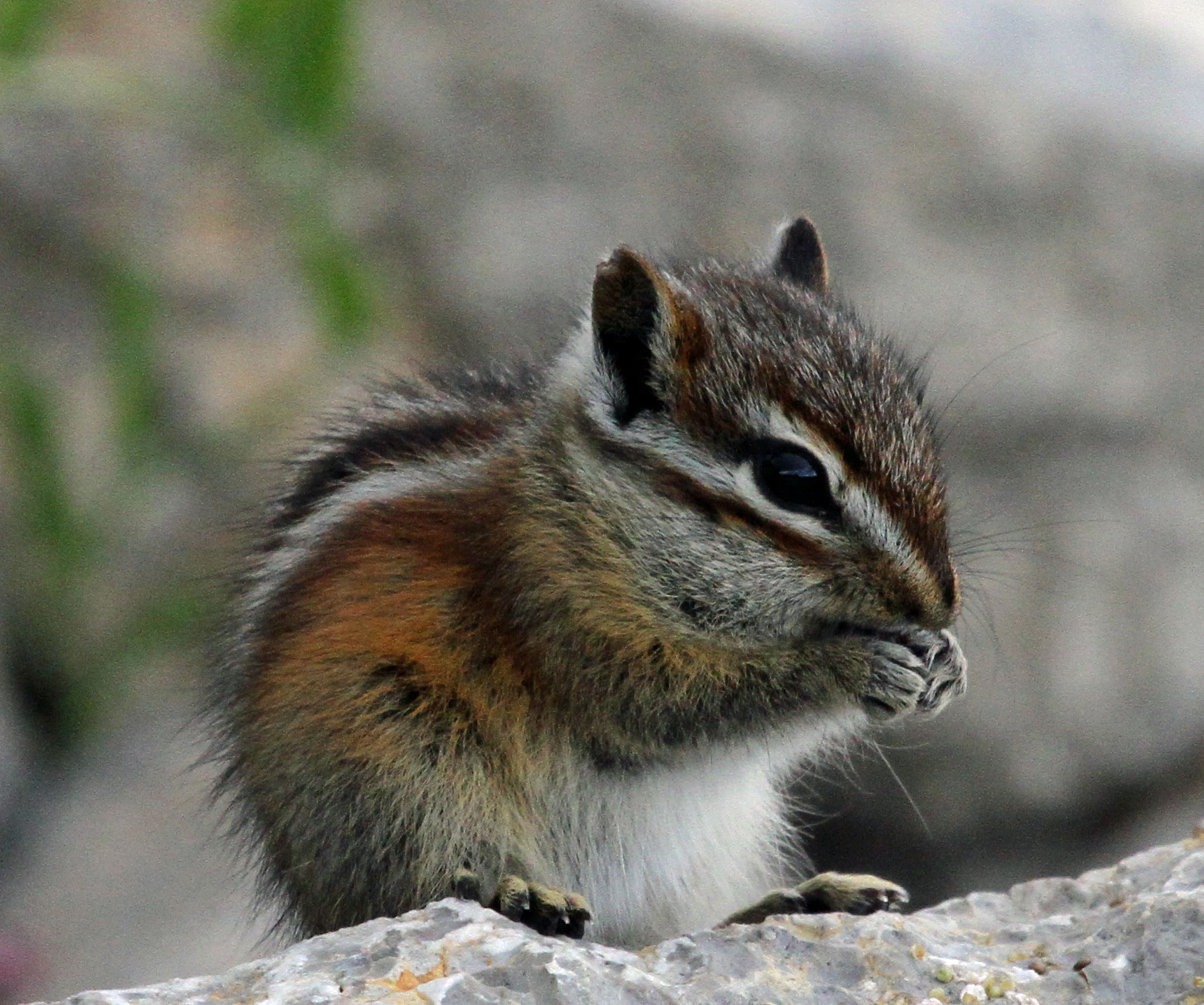

Conservation status
- Least Concern (IUCN 3.1)

Scientific classification
- Kingdom: Animalia
- Phylum: Chordata
- Class: Mammalia
- Order: Rodentia
- Family: Sciuridae
- Genus: Neotamias
- Species: N. cinereicollis

Binomial name
- Neotamias cinereicollis (J. A. Allen, 1890)

Synonyms
- Tamias cinereicollis J. A. Allen, 1890

= Gray-collared chipmunk =

Species of rodent

The gray-collared chipmunk (Neotamias cinereicollis) is a species of rodent in the family Sciuridae. It is endemic to Arizona and New Mexico in the United States.

== Description ==
The gray-collared chipmunk grows to a total length of about 225 mm (9 in) including a tail of around 98 mm (4 in). The forehead is greyish-brown, and the side of the head bears three dark stripes, the central one of which passes through the eye. These are separated by bands of white. The cheeks, neck, shoulders, upper back, and rump are grey. The rest of the upper surface of the body is yellowish-brown with five black or dark brown stripes on the back and sides, though the outer pair of stripes may be difficult to distinguish. The underparts are pale yellowish-brown. The tail is black above and creamy-white below, both surfaces being tinged with buff. The feet are pinkish-buff. The gray face and collar distinguish this species from others in the genus Neotamias.

== Distribution and habitat ==
The gray-collared chipmunk inhabits mountain coniferous forests in central and eastern Arizona and in central and western New Mexico. Its range extends from the Bill Williams Mountains, San Francisco Mountains and White Mountains to the Datil Mountains, Magdalena Mountains and San Mateo Mountains. Its altitudinal range is 1,950 to 3,440 metres (6,400 to 11,290 ft) but it is primarily found between 2,100 and 3,300 metres (6,900 and 10,800 ft). The gray-collared chipmunk is found in ponderosa pine and spruce-fir forests, often up to the timberline. It is commonest where pine and Douglas fir intermix, and is also found in oak and juniper forests.

== Behavior ==
The gray-collared chipmunk climbs well and is both arboreal and terrestrial. It is found in clearings and at forest edges but also in dense woodland. It is rather shy and when alarmed retreats into cover, but when undisturbed often sits on a stump or fallen tree, gently waving its tail from side to side and uttering a "chuck-chuck-chuck" call. The alarm call is a rapidly repeated, high-pitched "chipper". It feeds mainly on acorns, fir cones, berries, and the seeds of plants, but it also consumes tubers and roots, the fruiting bodies of fungi, green plant material, and occasionally insects. Most food is cached in holes and crevices for later use.

Breeding takes place in late spring and early summer. The nest is made in a concealed location under a log or rock, among tree roots, or in a hole in a tree. It is ball-shaped and lined with the stems of grasses and weeds. A litter of about five young is born after a gestation period of about thirty days. The young are weaned at forty days or later. The gray-collared chipmunk sometimes hibernates in winter but at other times is active, even in snowy conditions. In bad weather it may remain in its nest making use of stored foodstuffs.

== Status ==
The gray-collared chipmunk is listed by the IUCN as being of "least concern". This is because within its range it is common, it faces no major threats and its population size appears to be steady. In a suitable habitat in Arizona it was estimated to be present at the rate of five individuals per hectare in April, increasing to twelve per hectare in August.
