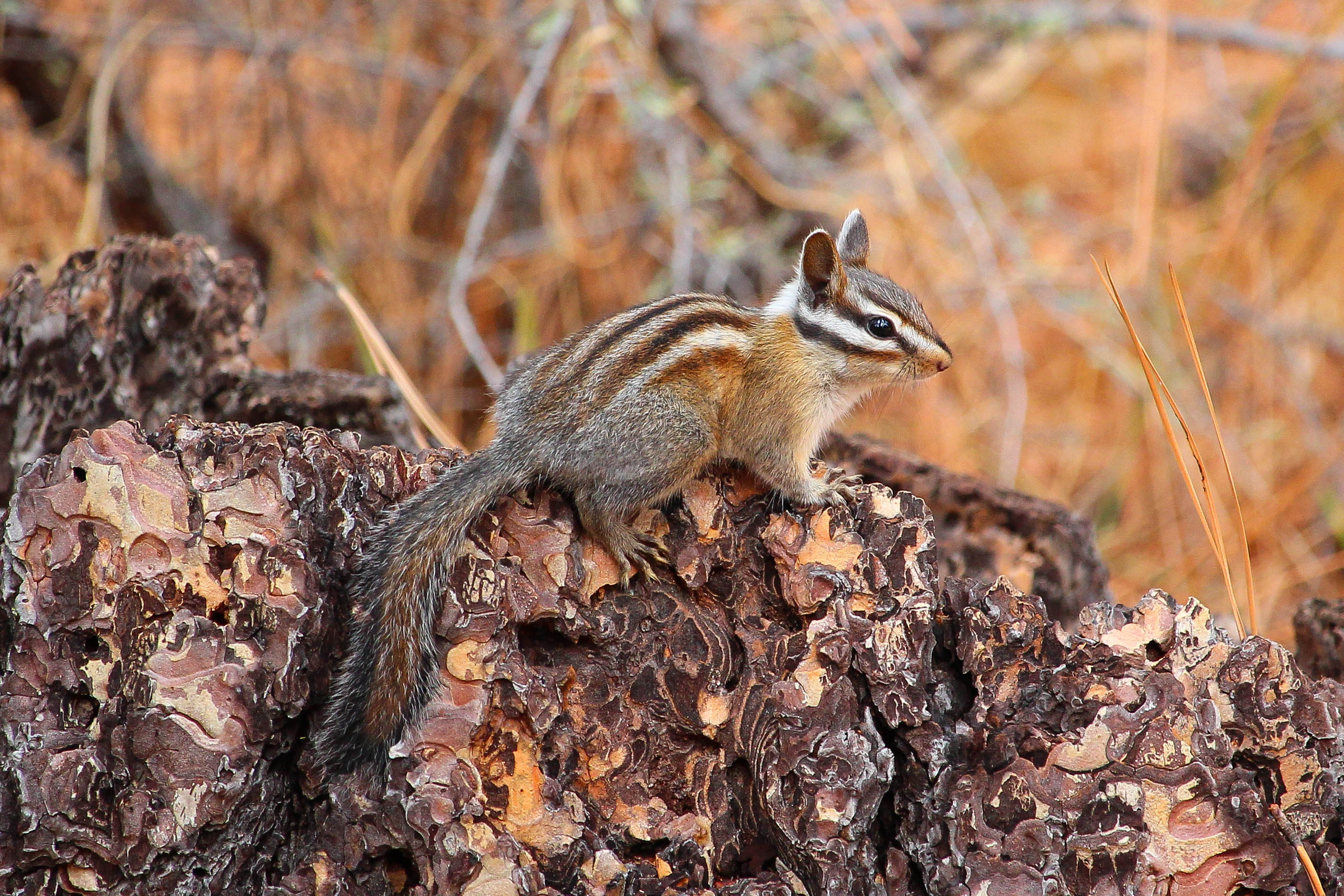

Conservation status
- Least Concern (IUCN 3.1)

Scientific classification
- Kingdom: Animalia
- Phylum: Chordata
- Class: Mammalia
- Order: Rodentia
- Family: Sciuridae
- Genus: Neotamias
- Species: N. quadrimaculatus

Binomial name
- Neotamias quadrimaculatus (J. E. Gray, 1867)
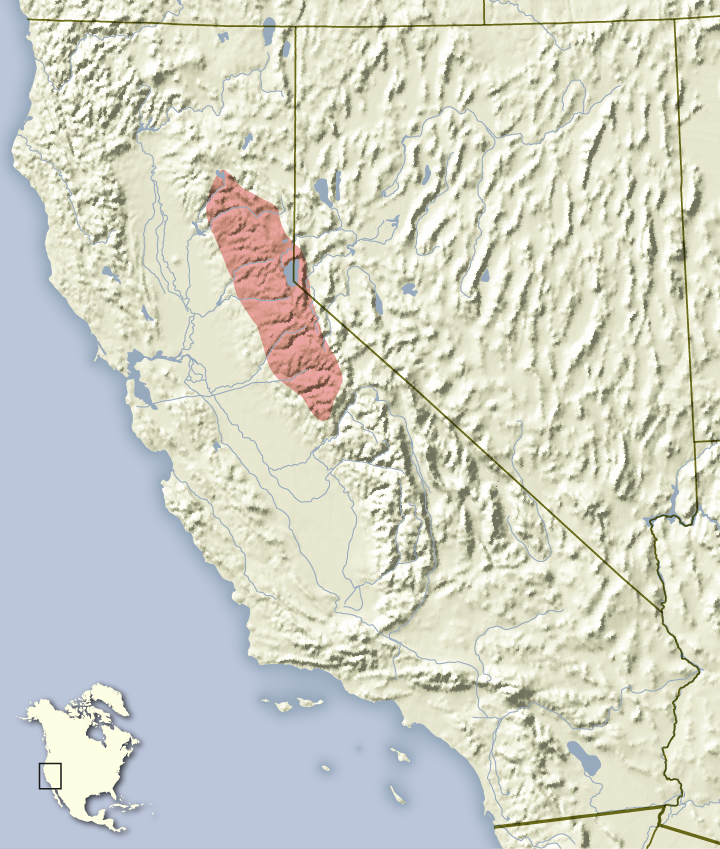
- Long-eared chipmunk range

Synonyms
- Tamias quadrimaculatus J. E. Gray, 1867

= Long-eared chipmunk =

Species of rodent

The long-eared chipmunk (Neotamias quadrimaculatus), also called the Sacramento chipmunk or the four-banded chipmunk, is a species of rodent in the squirrel family, Sciuridae. It is endemic to the central and northern Sierra Nevada of California and Nevada in the United States. Long-eared chipmunks have the longest ears of all species of chipmunks.

== Description ==
Male long-eared chipmunks range from 23.0–23.9 centimeters (9.1–9.4 in) in total length, while females range from 23.0–24.5 centimeters (9.1–9.6 in). The tail makes up a large part of the total length, ranging from 8.5–10.0 centimeters (3.3–3.9 in) in males and 9.0–10.1 centimeters (3.5–4.0 in) in females. Males weigh from 74.1–89.0 grams (2.61–3.14 oz), and females weigh from 81.0–105.0 grams (2.86–3.70 oz). The chipmunks are bright red-brown in color, displaying five dark stripes and four pale stripes on their backs. They also have large, noticeable white patches at the base of both ears.

== Behavior ==
Long-eared chipmunks are diurnal. They forage on the ground for fungi, seeds, fruits, flowers, and insects, though in the fall they will climb conifer trees to eat seeds from the cones. The chipmunks hibernate in a den on the ground from November until March, and live in burrows or tree hollows the rest of the year. They mate in late April and May, and the young are born after one month of gestation.
