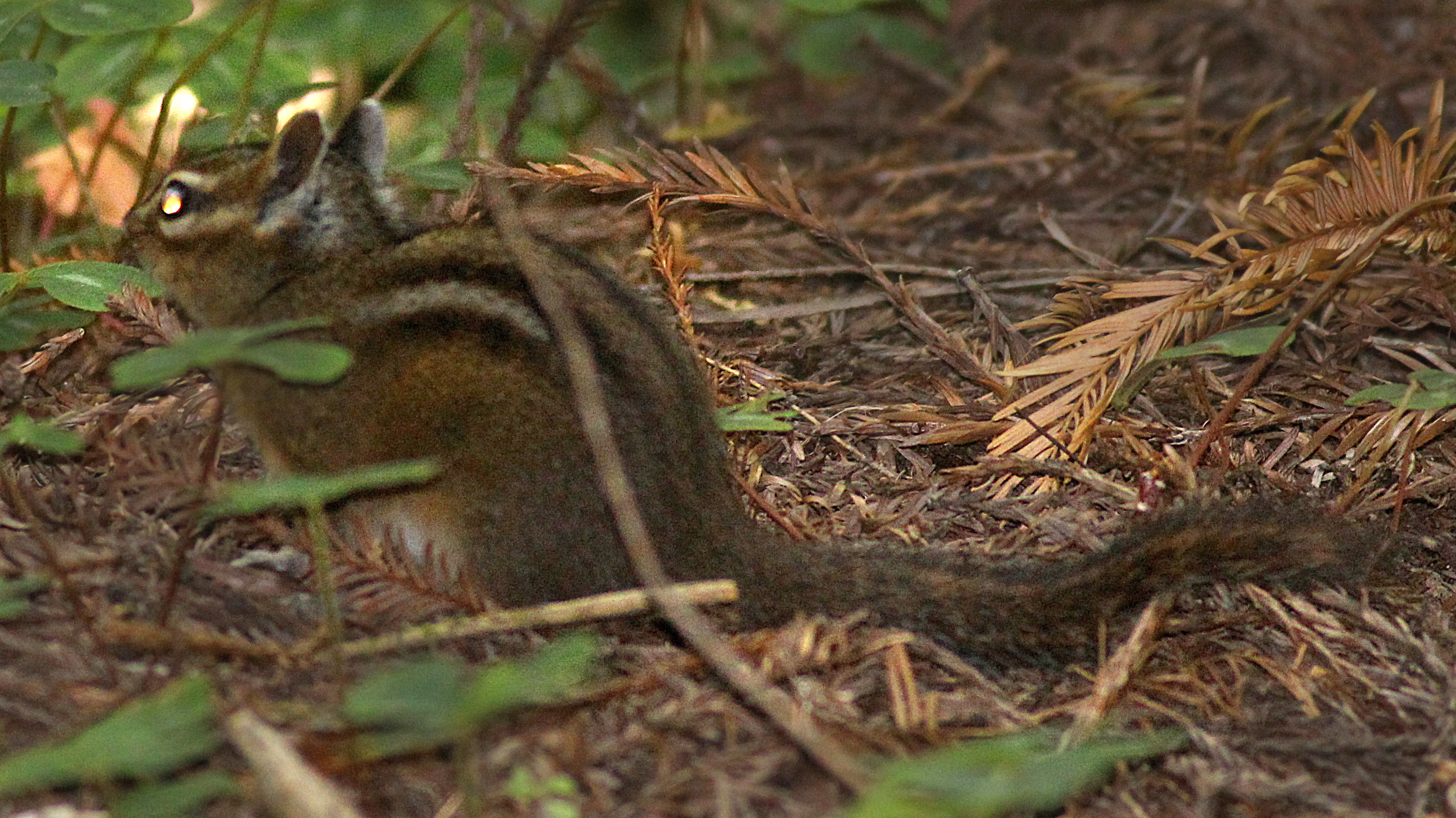

Conservation status
- Least Concern (IUCN 3.1)

Scientific classification
- Kingdom: Animalia
- Phylum: Chordata
- Class: Mammalia
- Order: Rodentia
- Family: Sciuridae
- Genus: Neotamias
- Species: N. ochrogenys

Binomial name
- Neotamias ochrogenys (Merriam, 1897)

Synonyms
- Tamias ochrogenys Merriam, 1897; Eutamias townsendi ochrogenys Merriam, 1897

= Yellow-cheeked chipmunk =

Species of rodent

The yellow-cheeked chipmunk (Neotamias ochrogenys), also known as the redwood chipmunk, is a species of rodent in the squirrel family, Sciuridae. It is endemic to areas near the coast of northern California in the United States where it inhabits coastal coniferous forest.

== Description ==
The yellow-cheeked chipmunk is the largest species in the genus Neotamias and grows to a total length of 233 to 297 mm (9.2 to 11.7 in) including a tail of 97 to 130 mm (3.8 to 5.1 in). It is a dark, tawny olive with five dark longitudinal stripes on the body, the central one along the spine being the most prominent, and three on the head, where the dark stripe running across the eye has pale stripes on either side. A pale patch of fur is found immediately behind the ear. The sides of the body are ochre which gradually fades to the paler underparts, where dark gray guard hairs are tipped with white. The bushy tail is dorsoventrally flattened, the upper surface being the same color as the body and the underside being reddish-brown to orange. The guard hairs on the tail are also tipped with white. It moults in the fall and the fur in the winter is duller colored, longer, and silkier.

== Distribution and habitat ==
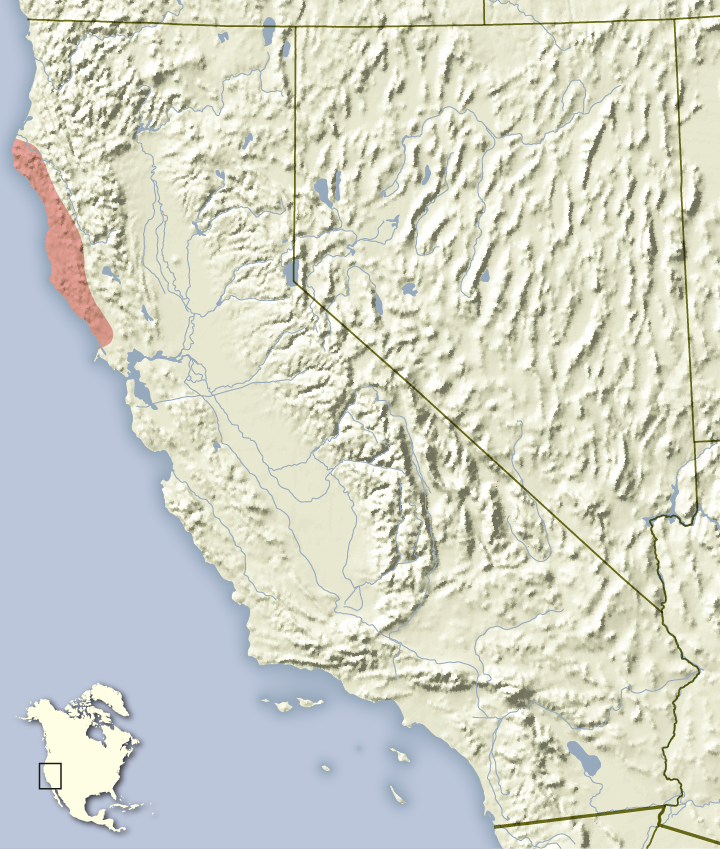
Distribution of the yellow-cheeked chipmunk

The yellow-cheeked chipmunk is endemic to the coast region of northern California, where it is present in a strip of land nowhere wider than 40 km (25 mi). The southern end of its range is a few kilometers north of Bodega Bay and Freestone in Sonoma County and the northern end is the Eel River in Humboldt County. It occurs at altitudes up to 1,280 m (4,200 ft) in the humid coastal strip of coniferous forest where an understory of shrubby growth occurs.

== Behavior ==
The yellow-cheeked chipmunk is secretive in its habits and rarely seen, but it can be heard emitting its characteristic shrill double-syllable "chuck-chuck" call which is relatively low-pitched compared to other chipmunk species. This is repeated at regular intervals and is most similar to the call of Townsend's chipmunk (Neotamias townsendii). Little is known of the reproductive habits of the yellow-cheeked chipmunk, but a female carrying four fetuses was caught in March and the testes of males are largest from March to June.

The yellow-cheeked chipmunk feeds on the seeds and fruits of a variety of plants. Grass seeds have been found in its cheek pouches, so it may store some food for later use. In the early part of the year, fungi are eaten and the acorns from oak trees and the seed capsules of stoneseed are eaten over a long period of the year. Insect wings have been found among the stomach contents, so some animal food may also be consumed.

== Status ==
Although the yellow-cheeked chipmunk has a limited range with a total area of occupancy of only 20,000 km^{2} (7,700 sq mi), the population is steady and it faces no particular threats, so the International Union for Conservation of Nature assesses it as being of "least concern".
