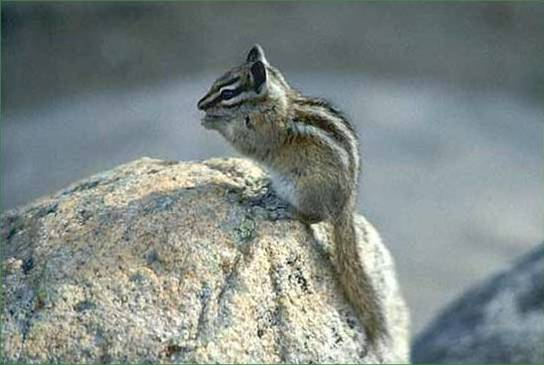

Conservation status
- Endangered (IUCN 3.1)

Scientific classification
- Kingdom: Animalia
- Phylum: Chordata
- Class: Mammalia
- Order: Rodentia
- Family: Sciuridae
- Genus: Neotamias
- Species: N. palmeri

Binomial name
- Neotamias palmeri (Merriam, 1897)

Synonyms
- Tamias palmeri (Merriam, 1897); Eutamias palmeri Merriam, 1897

= Palmer's chipmunk =

Species of rodent

Palmer's chipmunk (Neotamias palmeri) is a species of rodent in the family Sciuridae, endemic to Spring Mountains in southern Nevada. Its natural habitat is temperate forests. Palmer's chipmunks are limited to "sky islands" which are mountainous habitats that are surrounded by other lower elevation inhospitable habitats. It is primarily threatened by habitat loss. Palmer's chipmunk is named after Theodore Sherman Palmer, an American botanist and zoologist. With adequate habitat and food resources Palmer's chipmunks typically live from 1 to 4 years.

== Description ==
Palmer's chipmunk resembles other chipmunks in that it has solid black and white stripes that run down its body dorsally. The body of the chipmunk is tan while its ventral side is more pale. Total body length is 210–223 millimetres (8.3–8.8 in), with a tail of 86.5–101.5 millimetres (3.41–4.00 in). Adults weigh between 50 and 69.4 grams.

== Distribution and habitat ==
Palmer's chipmunk is found only in the Spring Mountains of Clark County, southern Nevada. They mostly occur at high elevation altitudes of 7,000–10,000 feet (2,100–3,000 m), inhabiting cliffs and forested areas between the upper pinyon pine and juniper regions, up and into the fir-pine and bristlecone pine communities. This species has been found to have the highest abundance within white fir and mixed conifer dense region of the Spring Mountains. Palmer's chipmunks typically prefer ground habitats as opposed to living off the forest floor in trees. They can build ground burrows spanning around 30 feet in length. There are some indications that the species prefers to associate with water sources. Palmer's chipmunk thrive in temperature zones of 32-34 °C. Areas with higher temperatures are not suitable for this species and hyperthermia can occur at temperature ranges above 34 °C. This temperature range limit may contribute to its high altitude exclusivity of habitat. Elevated climate limits foraging time and force these chipmunks to seek shelter for longer periods of time. Breeding and foraging may be limited by extreme temperature and contribute to the endangered status of this species.

== Ecology ==
The caches of Palmer's chipmunk have been found to contain seeds from the ponderosa pine, which are an important food resource of the chipmunk. This species is determined to be omnivores, they are known to eat local fruits, grass, insects, fungus, and the seeds of other conifers. Palmers chipmunks play a key role in the distribution of seeds for trees and other plants. The species hibernates in their underground burrows during cold weather, but is not an obligate hibernator. On warm winter days, Palmer's chipmunk will come out of its burrow to visit their caches for food. Palmer's chipmunk is a primary prey species for a number of animals in its habitat. Typical predators of the chipmunk are red-tailed hawks, rattlesnakes, coyotes, raccoons, long-tailed weasels, as well as feral cats and dogs. Palmer's chipmunks have been observed to forage for food in groups. Some members of a group will forage and feed while others will assess risk and keep watch for predators or other danger. The chipmunks will then chirp to one another to signal if a predator is near. This group feeding technique shows that Palmer's chipmunks have better chances of survival in higher numbers, as they can warn each other of danger.

=== Reproduction ===
Nests are most commonly built on the ground, typically underground in burrows, but can occasionally be found in trees. In late spring to early summer, female chipmunks have litters of 3 or 4 pups which are born hairless. After a month or so, the pups have developed a smooth fur coat and begin to move in and out of the nest. At about 6 weeks old, the pups emerge from the nests and have moved to a mostly solid food diet. Pups mature rapidly and can be independent by the end of the summer season. Palmer's chipmunk pups become sexually mature at around 10 months old. They typically breed once a year and females alone are responsible for caring for their young.

== Conservation ==
The species has been classified as endangered by the IUCN. The majority of the Palmer's chipmunk habitat is protected and managed by the Bureau of Land Management and U.S. Forest Service. Its habitat is being reduced by the extension of campgrounds, woodcutting, and the increasing sprawl of Las Vegas. Habitat loss for the Palmer's chipmunk can also be attributed to recreational wildfires and climate change. Predation by feral dogs and cats is also likely to be a factor. Habitat fragmentation due to the breaking up and degradation of forest habitats has led to an increase risk for these animals.
