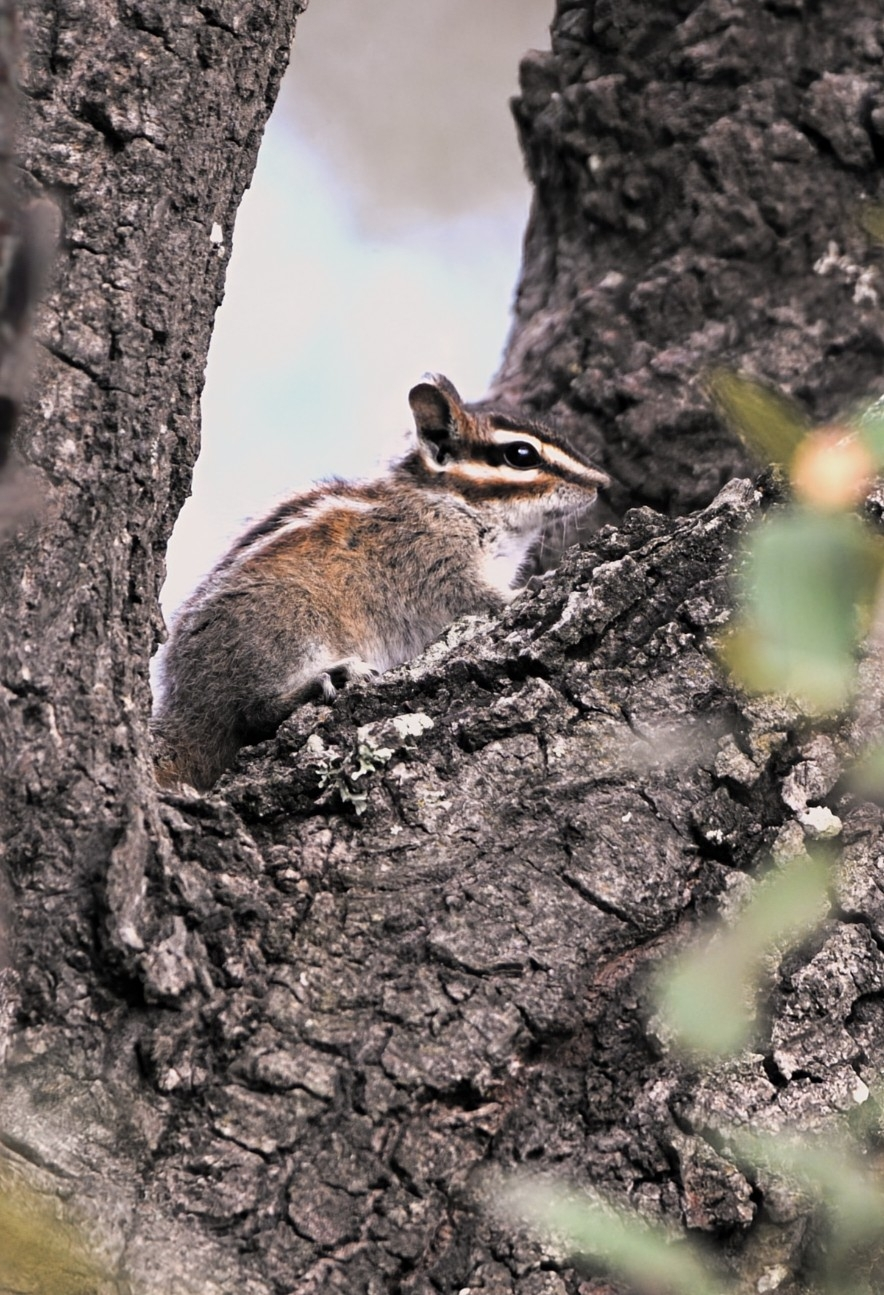

Conservation status
- Vulnerable (IUCN 3.1)

Scientific classification
- Kingdom: Animalia
- Phylum: Chordata
- Class: Mammalia
- Infraclass: Placentalia
- Order: Rodentia
- Family: Sciuridae
- Genus: Neotamias
- Species: N. bulleri

Binomial name
- Neotamias bulleri (J. A. Allen, 1889)

Synonyms
- Tamias bulleri J. A. Allen, 1889

= Buller's chipmunk =

Species of rodent

Buller's chipmunk (Neotamias bulleri) is a species of rodent in the family Sciuridae. It is endemic to Mexico.
