= Durango chipmunk =

Conservation status
- Least Concern (IUCN 3.1)

Scientific classification
- Kingdom: Animalia
- Phylum: Chordata
- Class: Mammalia
- Order: Rodentia
- Family: Sciuridae
- Genus: Neotamias
- Species: N. durangae

Binomial name
- Neotamias durangae (J. A. Allen, 1903)

Synonyms
- Tamias durangae J. A. Allen, 1903; Eutamias durangae J. A. Allen, 1903

Species of rodent

The Durango chipmunk (Neotamias durangae) is a species of rodent in the family Sciuridae. It is endemic to Mexico.

== Distribution ==
This species has a disjunct distribution, with populations in the Sierra Madre Occidental and Sierra Madre Oriental of northern Mexico. In the Sierra Madre Occidental it is found from southwestern Chihuahua to southern Durango, in humid areas between 1,980 and 2,590 meters elevation. The eastern population lives in the northern Sierra Madre Oriental and the Sierra del Carmen of Coahuila, where is ranges from 2,590 to 2,900 meters elevation.
