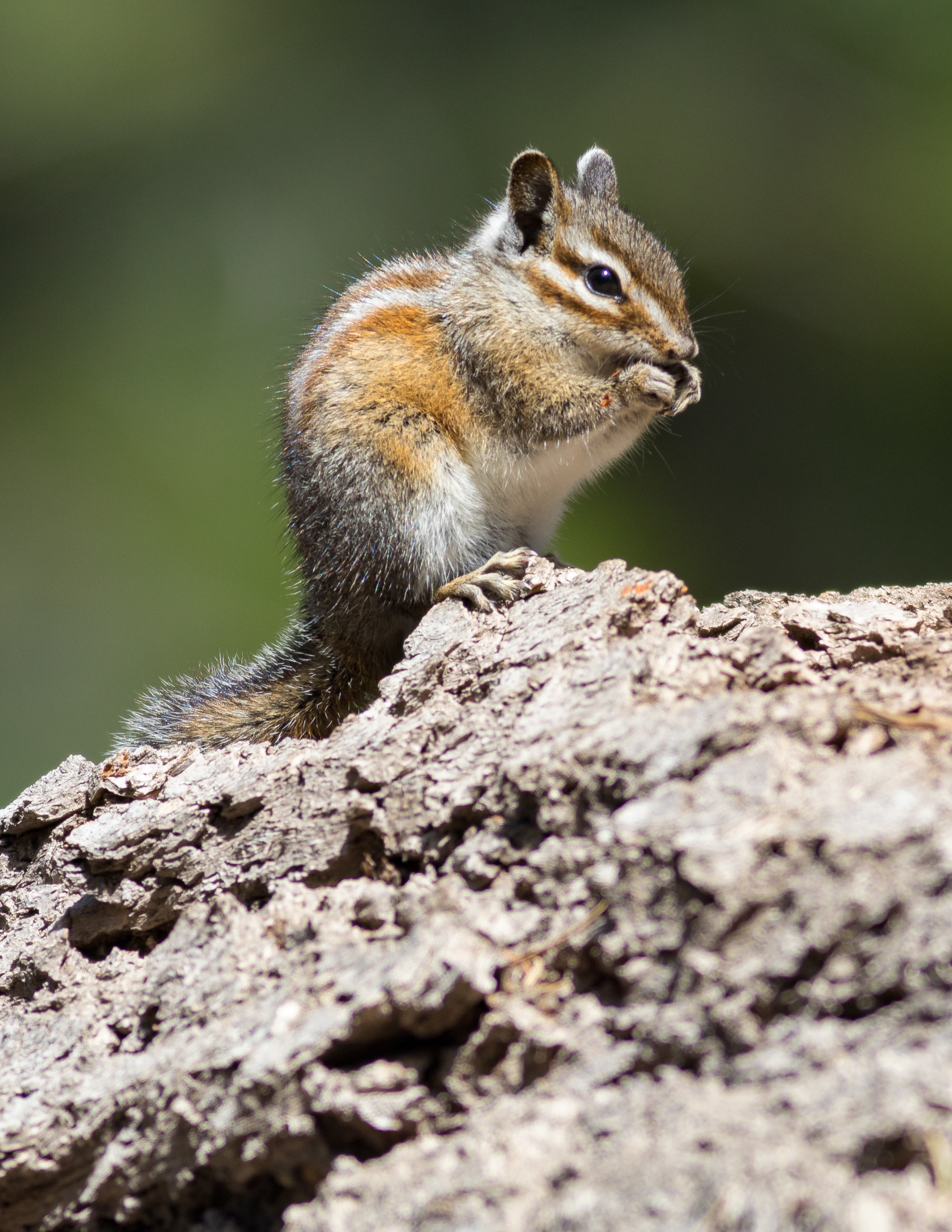

Conservation status
- Least Concern (IUCN 3.1)

Scientific classification
- Kingdom: Animalia
- Phylum: Chordata
- Class: Mammalia
- Infraclass: Placentalia
- Order: Rodentia
- Family: Sciuridae
- Genus: Neotamias
- Species: N. senex

Binomial name
- Neotamias senex (J. A. Allen, 1890)

Subspecies
- N. s. pacifica (Sutton & Patterson, 2000); N. s. senex (J. A. Allen, 1890)

Synonyms
- Tamias senex J. A. Allen, 1890

= Allen's chipmunk =

Species of rodent

Allen's chipmunk (Neotamias senex), also known as the shadow chipmunk, is a species of chipmunk native to the western United States. Occurring in California, Oregon, and Nevada, it is a common species of the Sierra Nevada.

== Description ==
Allen's chipmunk's total length measures about 229–261 mm (9.0–10.3 in), with a tail length of 90–111 mm (3.5–4.4 in). Adults weigh 66.8–108.5 g (2.36–3.83 oz), with females being larger than males on average as the species exhibits a dimorphism ration of 1.033. The coastal subspecies (Neotamias senex pacifica) is characterized by an overall dark fur complexion with indistinct dorsal stripes, similar to that of Neotamias townsendii. The inland subspecies (Neotamias senex senex) have a much lighter complexion, with brownish-yellow fur tinged with smoky gray. During the summer and winter, it displays a distinctive black median dorsal stripe along its back.

== Distribution ==
The coastal subspecies is found solely in the redwood forest belt of California that extends from the Pacific coast to about 32 km (20 mi) inland, and ranges from the Eel River of Humboldt County in the south to the Klamath River of Del Norte County in the north. The inland subspecies's range starts at Shaver Lake, Fresno County and stretches northwards and westwards into the Sierra Nevada, Cascade, Warner, and Yolla Bolly ranges, and bordering the eastern-most boundary of the coastal subspecies' range.

== Habitat ==
Allen's chipmunk is a primarily arboreal species, inhabiting coniferous forests and their dense shrubbery, as well as areas of adjacent chaparral. It has been observed as the only chipmunk species to have a preference for old-growth, closed-canopy forests. Nests are typically created in fallen logs or hollow trees, particularly those of the ponderosa pine and the Jeffrey pine. In the Sierra Nevada, nests have been found on top of partially broken-off trees as high as 27 m (88.6 ft) off the ground; these chipmunks have also been seen nesting in tree stumps and woodpecker holes.

Elevation for the coastal subspecies ranges from sea level to around 150 m. For the inland subspecies, specifically around the Sierra Nevada, the chipmunks can commonly be found between 1,220 and 2,350 m (4,000–7,700 ft), and as high as 2900 m (9,500 ft) in Yosemite National Park.

== Behavior ==
Allen's chipmunk exhibits a generally social nature. It has a chip vocalization that typically consists of a rapid series of calls, with each call being another rapid series of 3–5 syllables. It has a mean call duration of 0.81 seconds with 0.39 seconds between each syllable; calls are of a medium frequency, with a minimum frequency of 4.59 kHz and a maximum of 12.98 kHz. Its call has been observed as being used as an alarm call to possible threats. When approached by a predator, the chipmunk falls quiet and stays motionless, then resumes the alarm call when the predator has passed by. It has often been observed that when one chipmunk began to call, others would join in for up to 15 minutes.

It is diurnal, and hibernates from November through to March; it is one of the few species of chipmunks in North America that undergo seasonal fat accumulation, increasing their weight by as much as 20% by November in order to make it through the winter months. Before and after hibernation, the chipmunk tends to become quiet, secretive, and overall inactive. However, as more chipmunks emerged from hibernation in the spring, the population has been observed to become loud and aggressive.

=== Diet ===
Allen's chipmunk is omnivorous, with its diet consisting of fungi, insects, seeds, flowers, and fruit. Its diet is heavily dependent on geographical location and seasonality, mainly affecting the amount of fruit, flowers, and seeds consumed. Fungi, however, consistently serves as the chipmunk's primary food source, averaging around 60% of its food intake but getting as high as 99% when in virgin conifer forests. Allen's chipmunk uses its cheek pouches for food storage—primarily fungi—but has also been noted as the only species of chipmunk that collected the seeds that it ate.

=== Lifecycle ===
Mating activity begins about one month after emergence from hibernation and lasts for about four weeks, roughly spanning the months of March to April, however geographic variation can occur. The gestation period lasts about 28 days, with most litters being born in late May to early June, and are weaned for about 2 months until early August. The number of offspring ranges from 3 to 5, with the average being about 4.5. Both males and females reach reproductive maturity at 10 months.

Allen's chipmunk has two molts annually. The first follows shortly after breeding season, replacing the heavy, worn winter coat with a short, brighter coat. The second comes during late summer or early fall, before beginning the process of hibernation, replacing the light summer coat with a longer, softer, fuller, and more grayish coat.

Allen's chipmunk has been observed to live as long as 8 years in the wild. However, due to a lack of data on Allen's chipmunk, specifics on its life expectancy are unknown.

Natural predators of Allen's chipmunk include hawks, owls, foxes, coyotes, snakes, badgers, and weasels.
