= Arthur H. Howell =

American zoologist (1872–1940)

Arthur Holmes Howell
- Born: May 3, 1872; Lake Grove, New York
- Died: July 10, 1940 (aged 68)
- Scientific career
- Fields: Zoology; Mammalogy; Ornithology
- Author abbrev. (zoology): A. H. Howell

Arthur Holmes Howell (May 3, 1872 – July 10, 1940) was an American zoologist most notable for his field work on mammals and birds in Alabama, Arkansas, Florida, Georgia, Idaho, Illinois, Kentucky, Louisiana, Missouri, Montana, New Mexico, and Texas.

Howell was born in Lake Grove, New York. In 1889, he became a member of the American Ornithologists' Union. By 1895, he accompanied Vernon Bailey as field assistant during surveys in Montana, Idaho, Washington, and Oregon.

Howell described several mammals and birds, including the gray bat, the Cape Sable seaside sparrow, and the red-tailed chipmunk. In 1898, he visited Great Gull Island and confirmed the extinction of the Gull Island vole.

Howell published 118 works, including Birds of Arkansas (1911), Birds of Alabama (1924), and Florida bird life (1932)

== See also ==
- Passenger pigeon
