= Mammals of Glacier National Park (U.S.) =

List of mammals at an American park

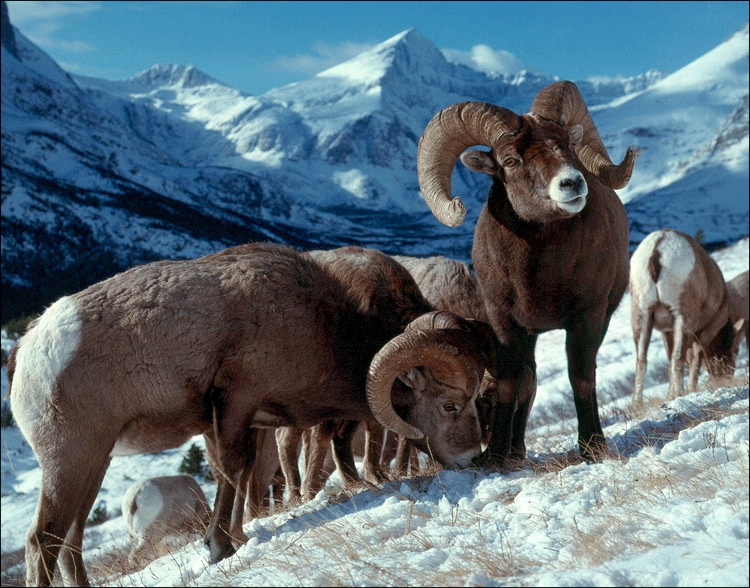
Bighorn sheep

There are at least 14 large mammal and 50 small mammal species known to occur in Glacier National Park.

Species are listed by common name or scientific name. Common and scientific names from R. S. Hoffman and D. L. Pattie, A Guide to Montana Mammals, 1968.

== Legend ==
- E - Occurs east of the Continental Divide (Spruce-fir forest, aspen, bunchgrass meadows)
- W - Occurs west of the Continental Divide (Cedar, hemlock, yew, lodgepole, fir, western larch forest, some meadows)
- A - Occurs in alpine areas (Above upper edge of continuous forest, open areas, makes up about 1/3 of park along Continental Divide)
- R - Occurs only rarely in the park
- H - Historically in park, but no longer present (Not included in counts above)

== Large mammals ==
=== Black bear ===
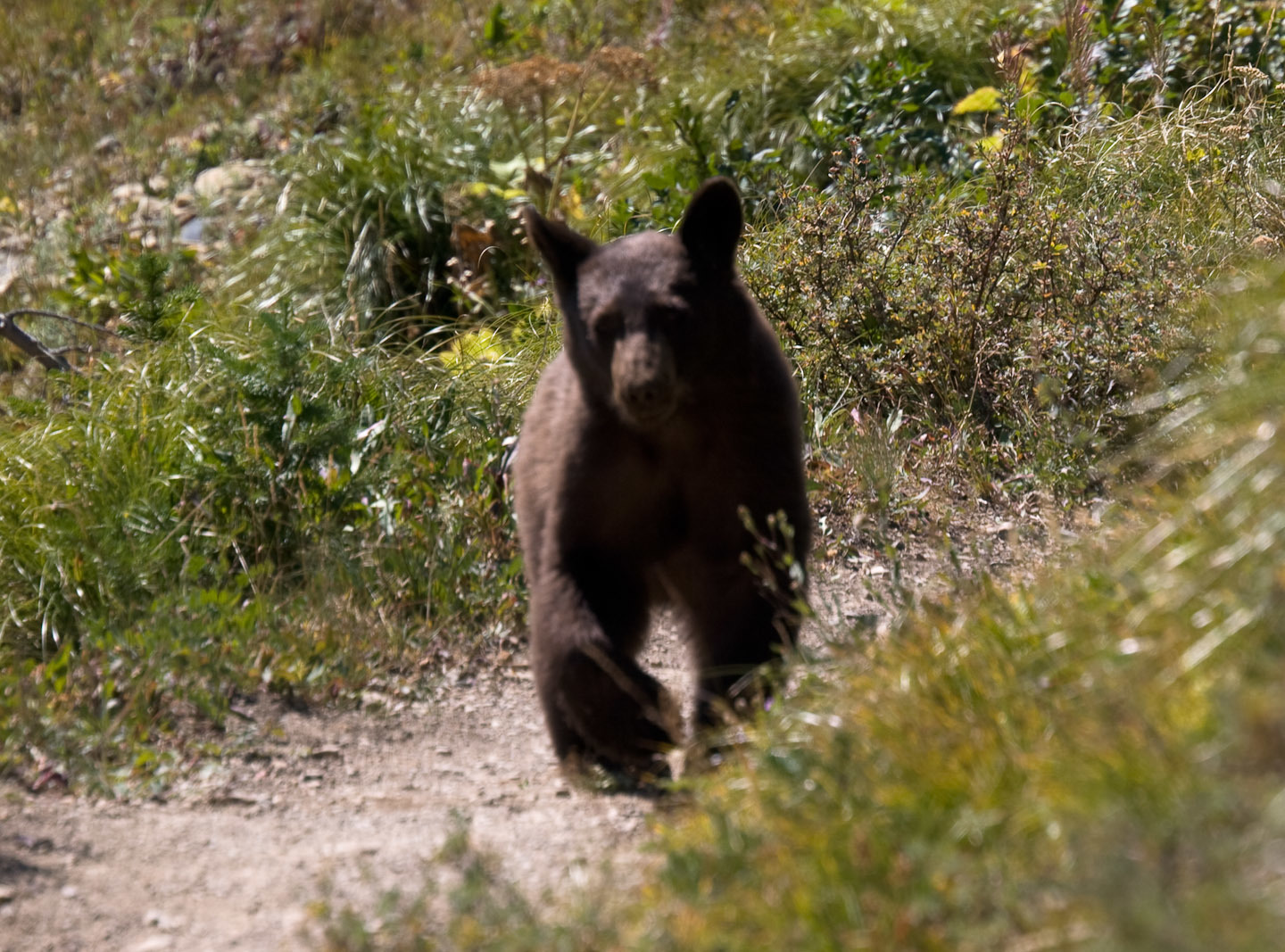
Black bear

Order: Carnivora, Family: Ursidae

Occurrence: Forests, slide areas, alpine meadows E W A

The American black bear (Ursus americanus) is North America's smallest and most common species of bear. It is a generalist animal, being able to exploit numerous different habitats and foodstuffs. The American black bear is listed by the IUCN as least concern, due to the species' widespread distribution and a large global population, estimated to be twice that of all other bear species combined.

=== Bighorn sheep ===
Order: Artiodactyla, Family: Bovidae

Occurrence: Open mountainous areas E W A

Bighorn sheep (Ovis canadensis) is a species of sheep in North America with large horns. The horns can weigh up to 30 pounds (14 kg), while the sheep themselves weigh up to 300 pounds (140 kg). Recent genetic testing indicates that there are three distinct subspecies of Ovis canadensis, one of which is endangered: Ovis canadensis sierrae.

=== American bison ===
Order: Artiodactyla Family: Bovidae

Occurrence: Eastside parklands and prairies, E H

The American bison (Bison bison) is a North American species of bison, also commonly known as the American buffalo. These bison once roamed the grasslands of North America in massive herds; their range roughly formed a triangle between the Great Bear Lake in Canada's far northwest, south to the Mexican states of Durango and Nuevo León, and east along the western boundary of the Appalachian Mountains.

=== Bobcat ===
Order: Carnivora, Family: Felidae

Occurrence: Open forests, brushy areas E W R

The bobcat (Lynx rufus) is a North American mammal of the cat family, Felidae. With twelve recognized subspecies, it ranges from southern Canada to northern Mexico, including most of the continental United States. The bobcat is an adaptable predator that inhabits wooded areas, as well as semi-desert, urban edge, forest edges and swampland environments. It persists in much of its original range and populations are healthy.

=== Cougar ===
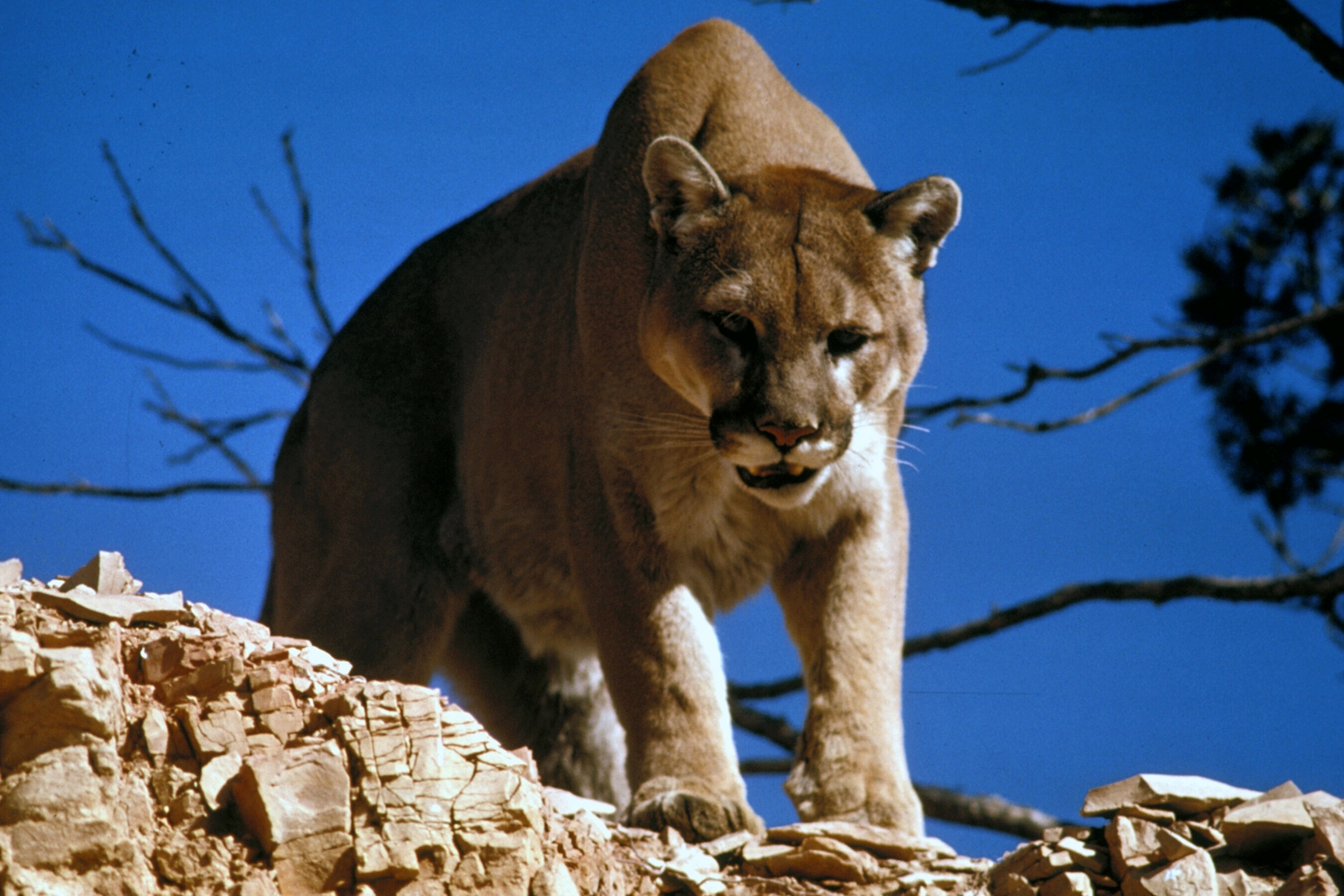
Cougar

Order: Carnivora, Family: Felidae

Occurrence: Coniferous forests E W

The cougar (Puma concolor), also known as puma, mountain lion, mountain cat, catamount or panther, depending on the region, is a mammal of the family Felidae, native to the Americas. This large, solitary cat has the greatest range of any large wild terrestrial mammal in the Western Hemisphere, extending from Yukon in Canada to the southern Andes of South America. An adaptable, generalist species, the cougar is found in every major American habitat type. It is the second heaviest cat in the American continents after the jaguar. Although large, the cougar is most closely related to smaller felines.

=== Coyote ===
Order: Carnivora, Family: Canidae

Occurrence: Forests, grasslands E W A

The coyote (/kaɪˈoʊtiː/ or /ˈkaɪ.oʊt/) (Canis latrans), also known as the American jackal or the prairie wolf, is a species of canid found throughout North and Central America, ranging from Panama in the south, north through Mexico, the United States and Canada. It occurs as far north as Alaska, but not the Canadian Arctic.

=== Elk ===
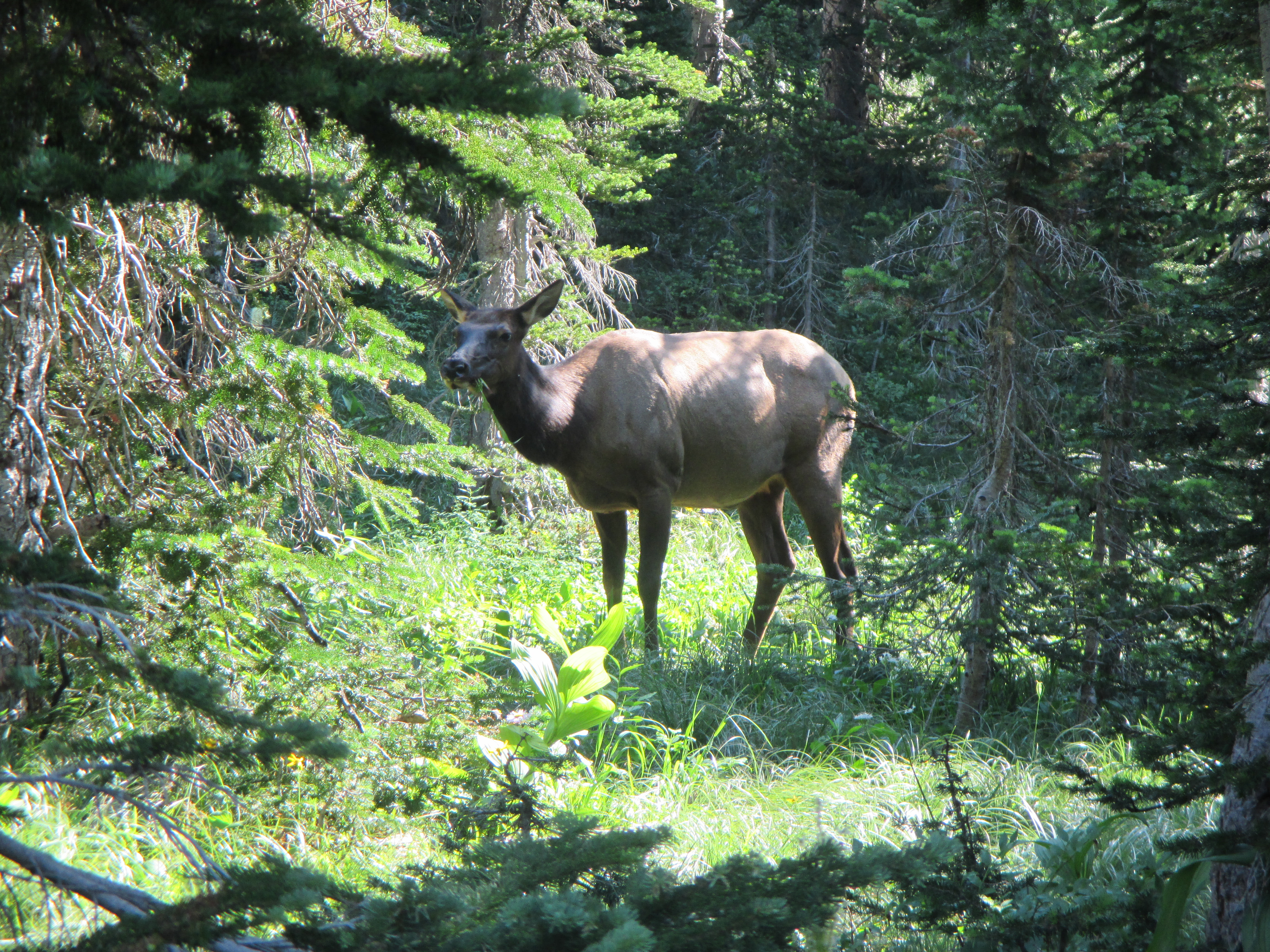
Elk

Order: Artiodactyla, Family: Cervidae

Occurrence: Open forests, meadows E W A

The elk, or wapiti (Cervus canadensis), is one of the largest species of deer in the world and one of the largest mammals in North America and eastern Asia. In the deer family (Cervidae), only the moose, Alces alces (called an "elk" in Europe), is larger, and Cervus unicolor (the sambar deer) can rival the C. canadensis elk in size. Elk range in forest and forest-edge habitat, feeding on grasses, plants, leaves, and bark.

=== Grizzly bear ===
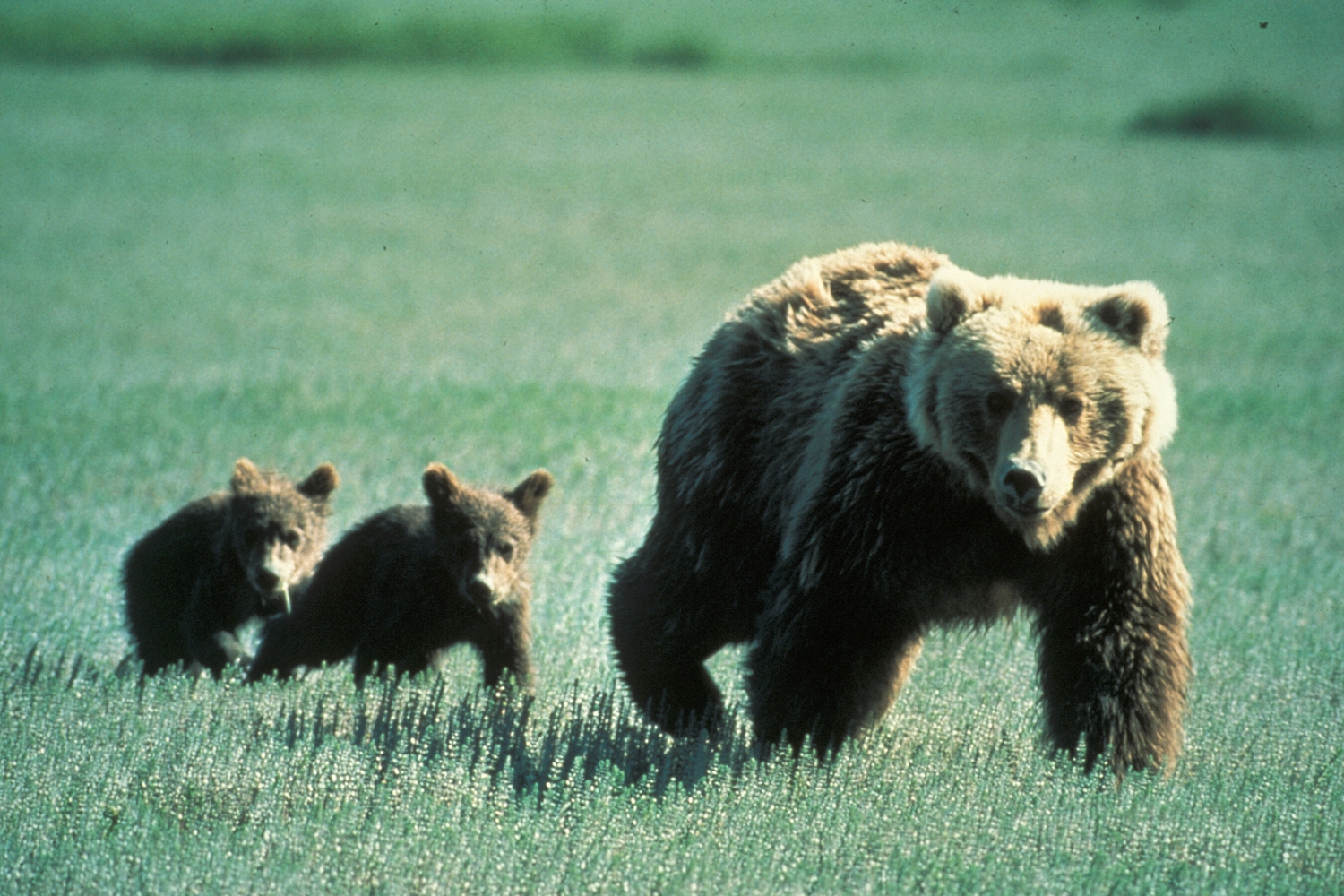
Grizzly with cubs

Order: Carnivora, Family: Ursidae

Occurrence: Forests, slide areas, alpine meadows E W A

The grizzly bear (Ursus arctos horribilis), also known as the silvertip bear, is a subspecies of brown bear (Ursus arctos) that generally lives in the uplands of western North America. Grizzlies are normally solitary active animals, but in coastal areas the grizzly congregates alongside streams, lakes, rivers, and ponds during the salmon spawn.

=== Canada lynx ===
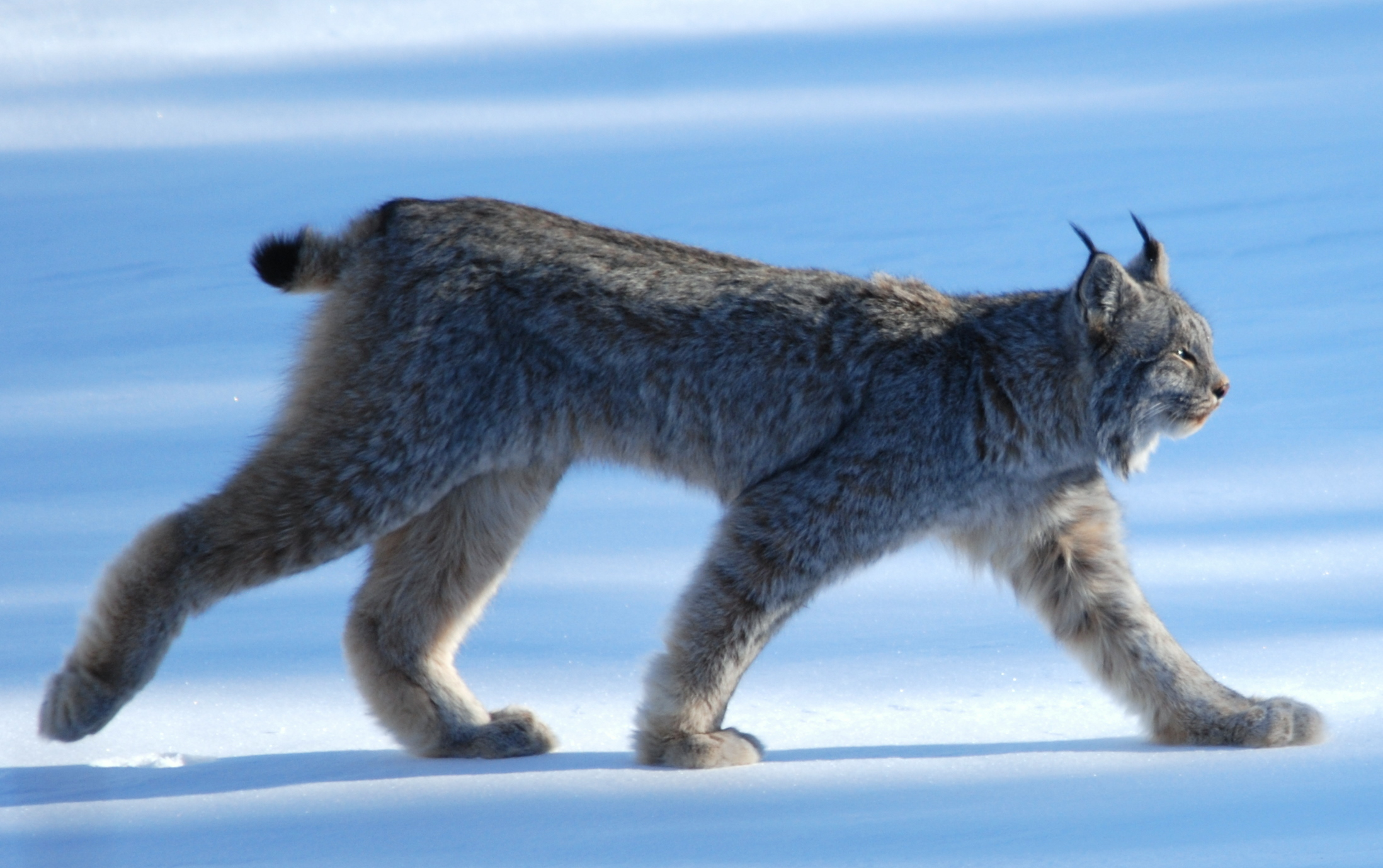
Canada lynx

Order: Carnivora, Family: Felidae

Occurrence: Coniferous forests E W

The Canada lynx (Lynx canadensis) is a North American mammal of the cat family, Felidae. It is a close relative of the Eurasian lynx (Lynx lynx). Some authorities regard both as conspecific. However, in some characteristics, the Canada lynx is more like the bobcat (Lynx rufus) than the Eurasian lynx. With the recognized subspecies, it ranges across Canada and into Alaska as well as some portions of the northern United States.

=== Moose ===
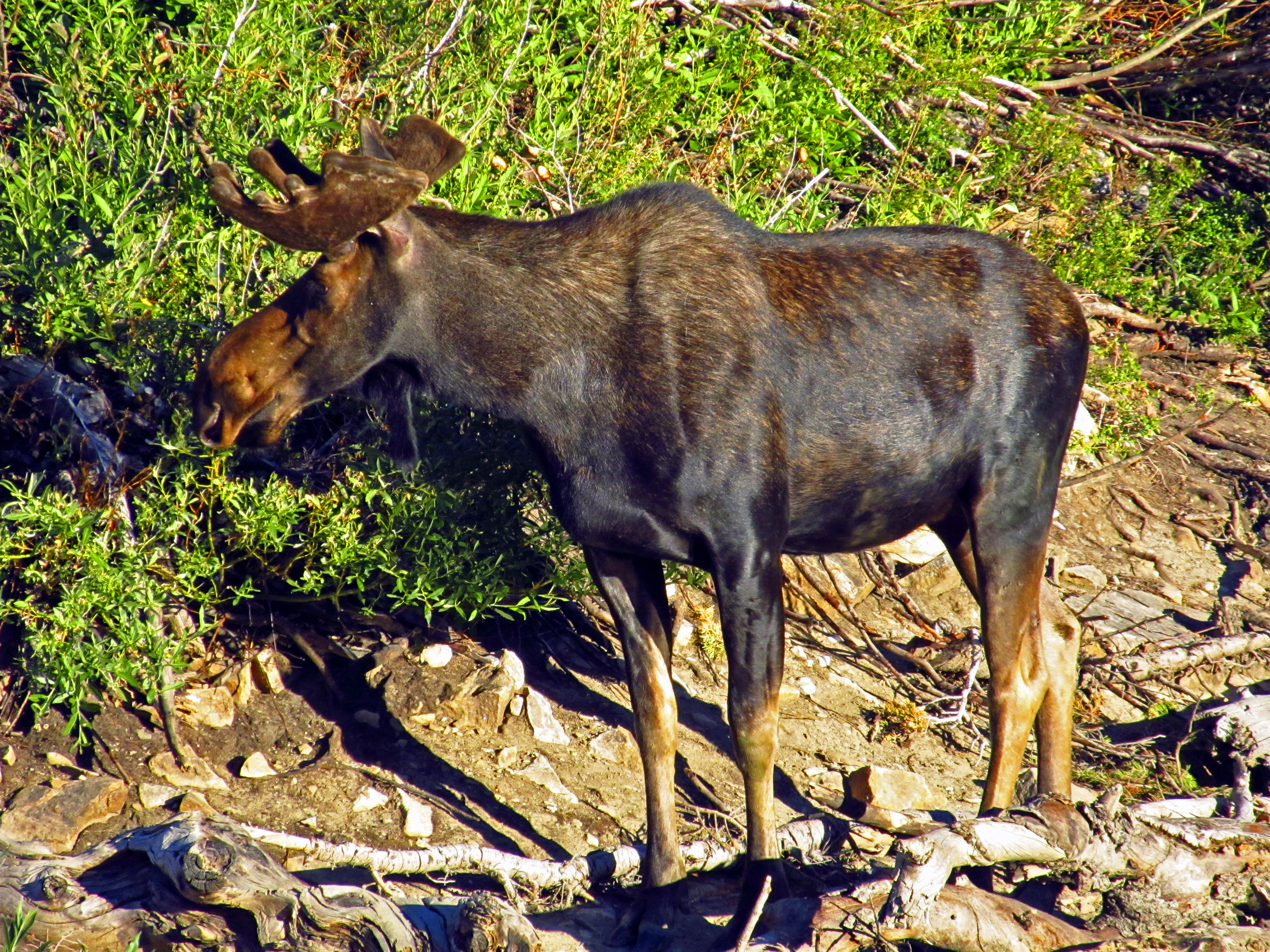
Moose

Order: Artiodactyla, Family: Cervidae

Occurrence: Coniferous forests, lakes, slow streams, marshy areas E W

The moose (North America) or common European elk (Europe), Alces alces, is the largest extant species in the deer family. Moose are distinguished by the palmate antlers of the males; other members of the family have antlers with a "twig-like" configuration. Moose typically inhabit boreal and mixed deciduous forests of the Northern Hemisphere in temperate to subarctic climates.

=== Mountain goat ===
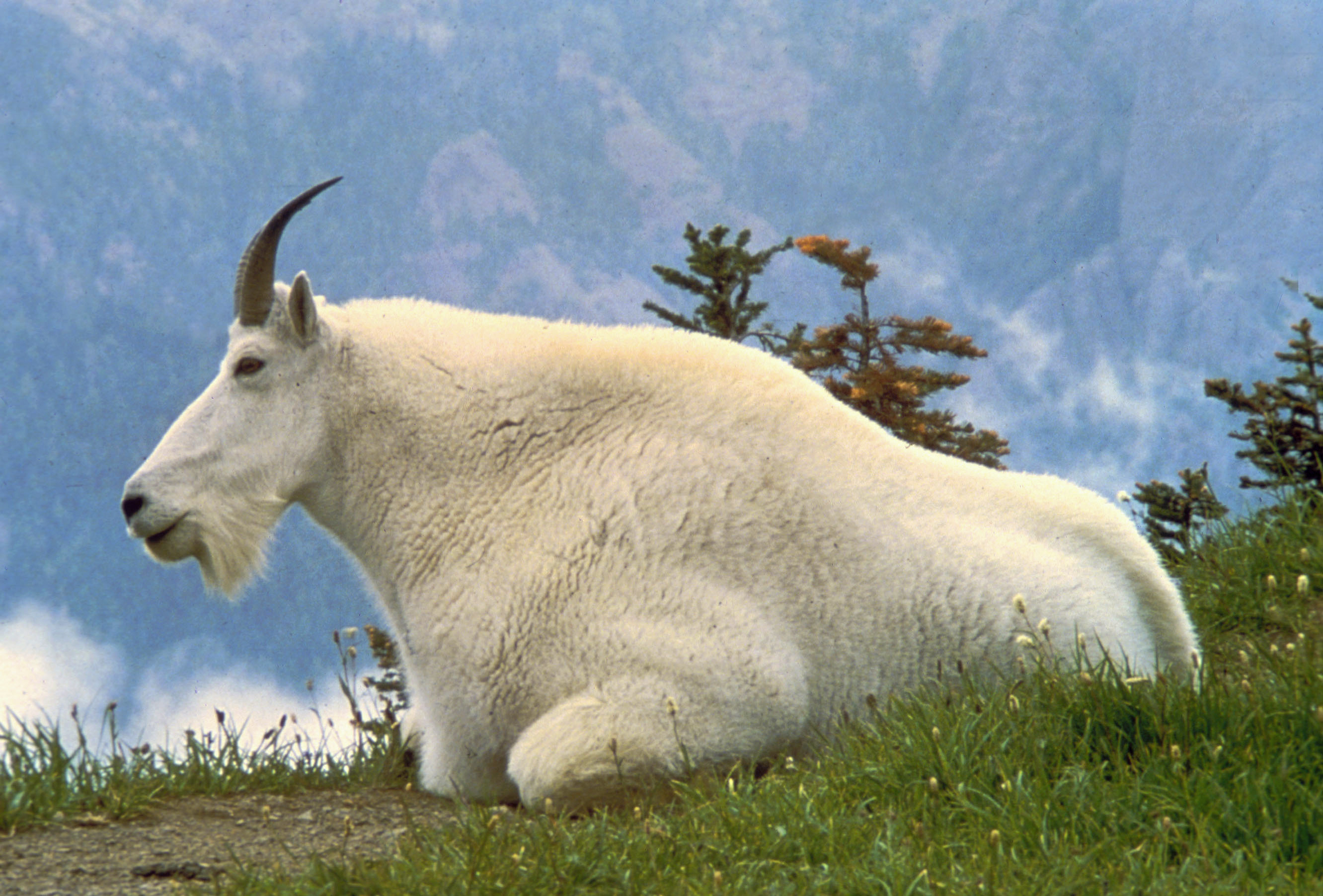
The mountain goat is the official symbol of Glacier National Park.

Order: Artiodactyla, Family: Bovidae

Occurrence: High peaks and meadows E W A

The mountain goat (Oreamnos americanus), also known as the Rocky Mountain goat, is a large-hoofed mammal found only in North America. Despite its vernacular name, it is not a member of Capra, the genus of true goats. It resides at high elevations and is a sure-footed climber, often resting on rocky cliffs that predators cannot reach.

=== Mule deer ===
Order: Artiodactyla, Family: Cervidae

Occurrence: Open forests, meadows, often at high elevations E W A

The mule deer (Odocoileus hemionus) is a deer whose habitat is in the western half of North America. It gets its name from its large mule-like ears. Adult male mule deer are called bucks, adult females are called does, and young of both sexes are called fawns. The black-tailed deer is considered by some a distinct species though it is classified as a subspecies of the mule deer. Unlike its cousin, the white-tailed deer, mule deer are generally more associated with the land west of the Missouri River. The most noticeable differences between whitetails and mule deer are the color of their tails and configuration of their antlers. The mule deer's tail is black tipped.

=== Gray wolf ===
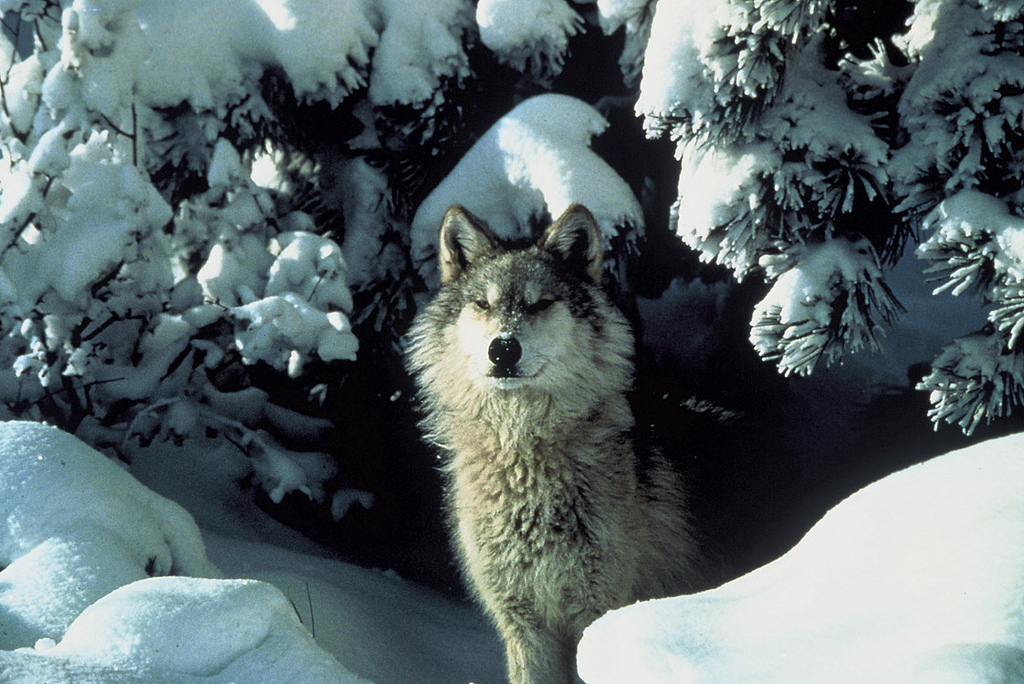
Northern Rocky Mountain wolf

Order: Carnivora, Family: Canidae

Occurrence: Coniferous forests E W

A gray wolf or grey wolf (Canis lupus), often known simply as the wolf which is the largest wild member of the family Canidae. It is an ice age survivor originating during the Late Pleistocene around 300,000 years ago. DNA sequencing and genetic drift studies reaffirm that the gray wolf shares a common ancestry with the domestic dog (Canis lupus familiaris). Although certain aspects of this conclusion have been questioned, the main body of evidence confirms it. A number of other gray wolf subspecies have been identified, though the actual number of subspecies is still open to discussion. Northwestern wolves are typically apex predators in the ecosystems they occupy.

=== Pronghorn ===
Order: Artiodactyla, Family: Antilocapridae

Occurrence: Eastside prairies, E H

The pronghorn (Antilocapra americana), is a species of artiodactyl mammal native to interior western and central North America. Though not a true antelope, it is often known colloquially in North America as the prong buck, pronghorn antelope or simply antelope, as it closely resembles the true antelopes of the Old World and fills a similar ecological niche due to convergent evolution. It is the only surviving member of the family Antilocapridae.

=== Red fox ===
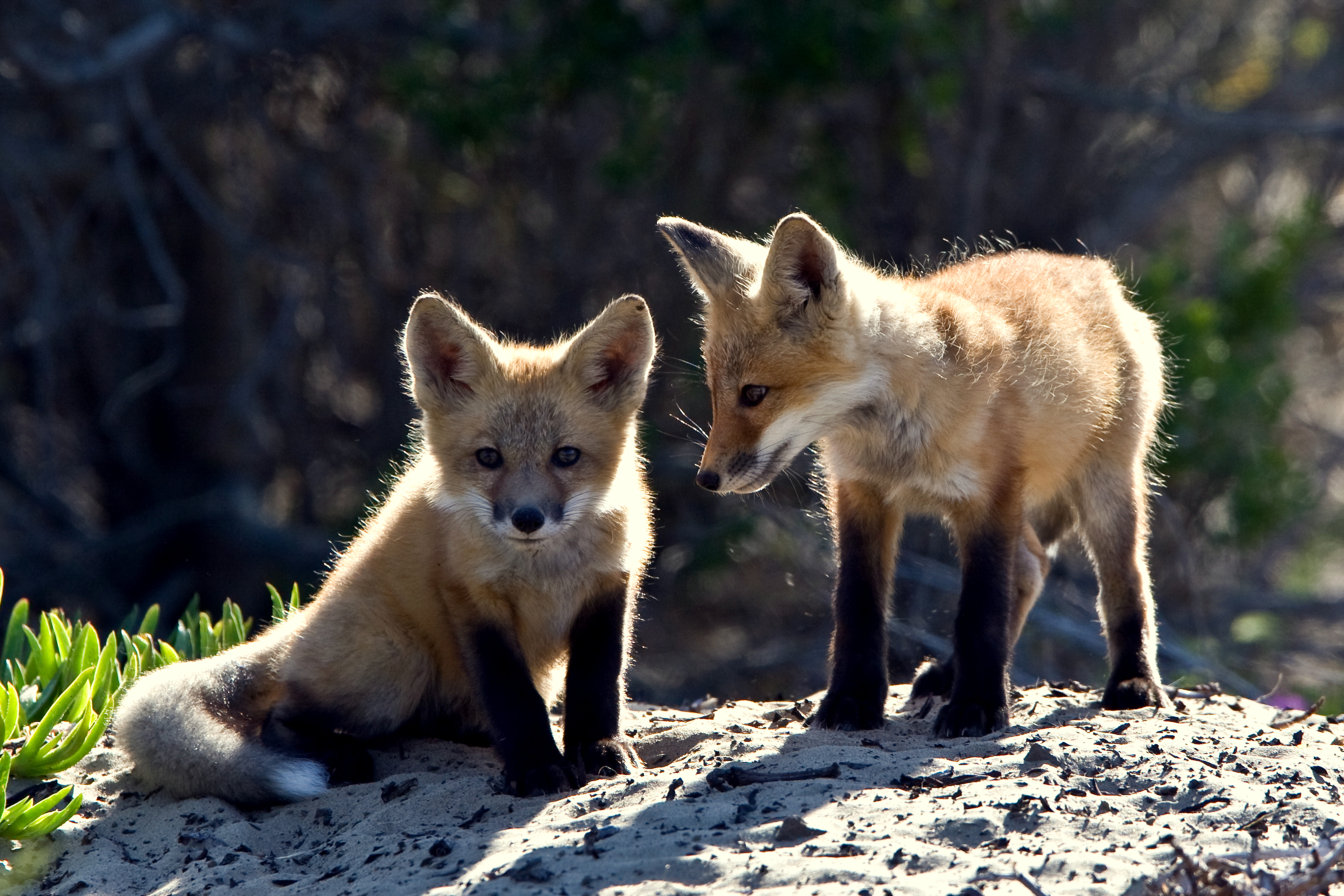
Red fox kits

Order: Carnivora, Family: Canidae

Occurrence: Grasslands, open forest E W R

The red fox (Vulpes vulpes) is a small canid native to much of North America and Eurasia, as well as northern Africa. It is the most recognizable species of fox and in many areas it is referred to simply as "the fox". As its name suggests, its fur is predominantly reddish-brown, but there is a naturally occurring grey morph known as the "silver" fox. The red fox is by far the most widespread and abundant species of fox, found in almost every single habitat in the Northern Hemisphere, from the coastal marshes of United States, to the alpine tundras of Tibetan Plateau.

=== Swift fox ===
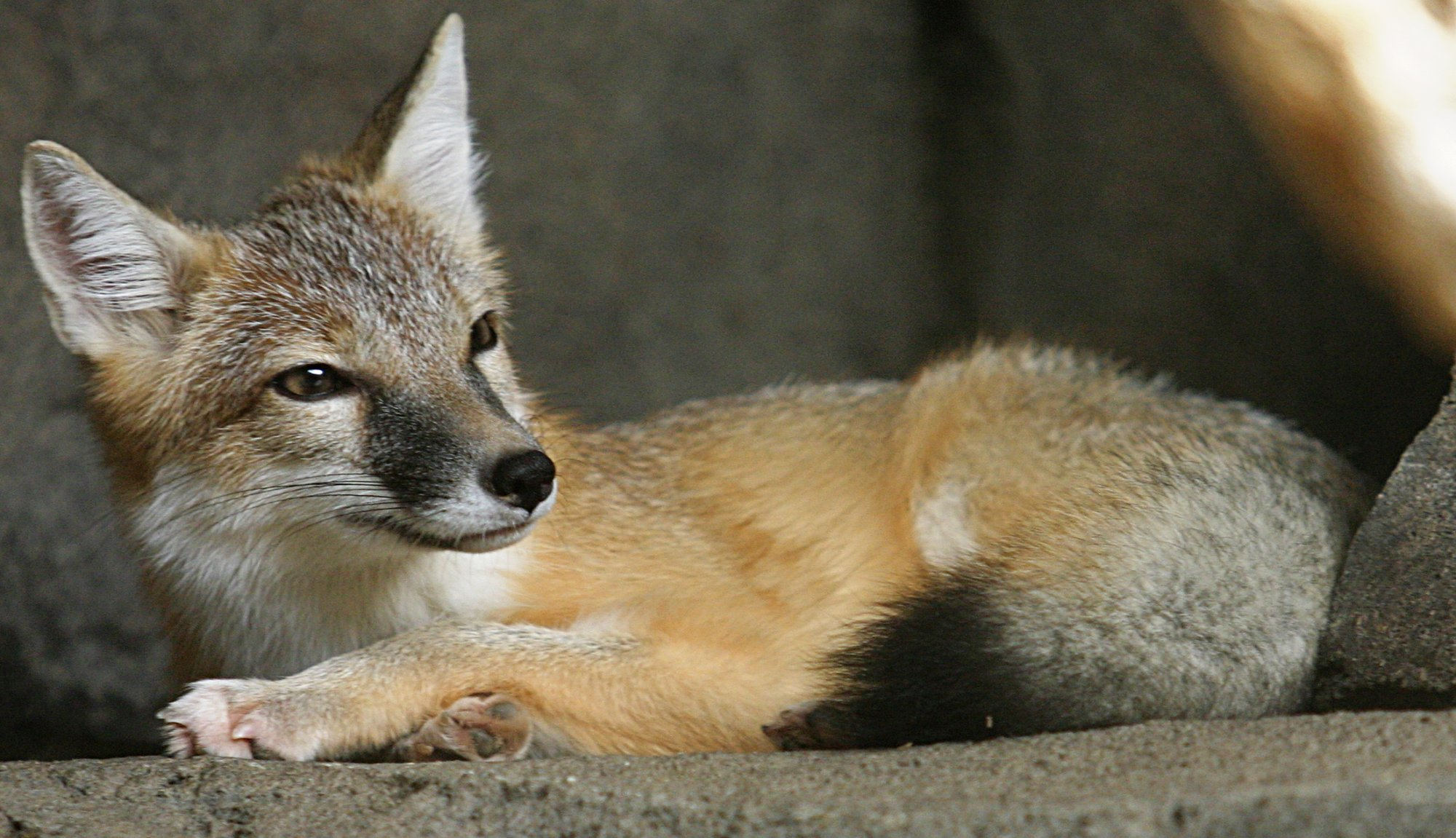
Swift fox

Order: Carnivora, Family: Canidae

Occurrence: E, H

The swift fox (Vulpes velox) is a small light orange-tan fox around the size of a domestic cat found in the western grasslands of North America, such as Colorado, New Mexico and Texas. It also lives in Manitoba, Saskatchewan and Alberta in Canada, where it was previously extirpated. It is closely related to the kit fox and the two species are sometimes known as subspecies of Vulpes velox because hybrids of the two species occur naturally where their ranges overlap.

The swift fox lives primarily in short-grass prairies and deserts. Due to predator control programs in the 1930s, it was extinct in Canada for some time, but reintroduction programs have been successful in reintroducing the species. Due to stable populations elsewhere, the species is considered by the IUCN to be of least concern.

=== White-tailed deer ===
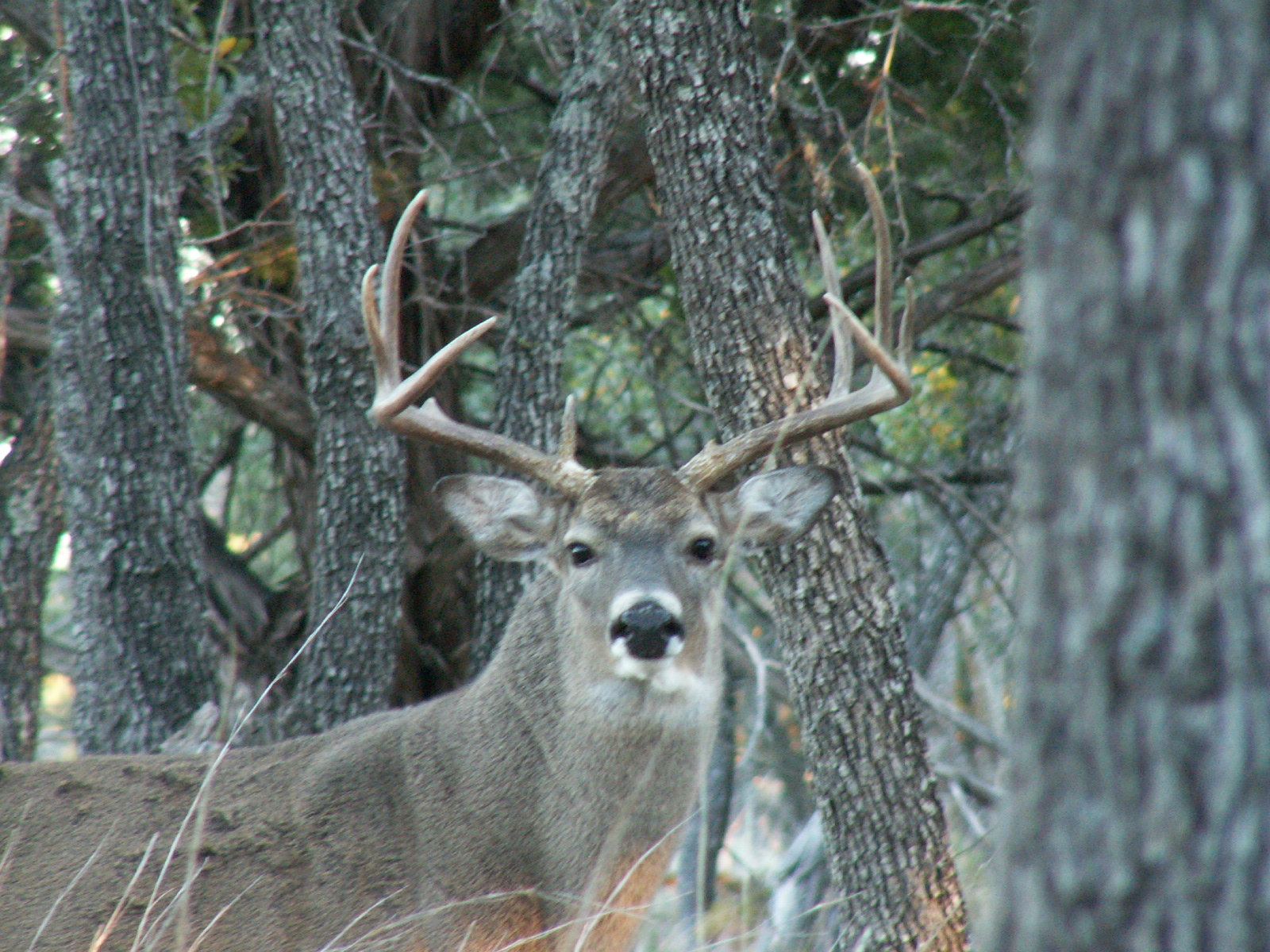
White-tailed deer buck

Order: Artiodactyla, Family: Cervidae

Occurrence: Coniferous forests, meadows, creek and river bottoms, E W

The white-tailed deer (Odocoileus virginianus), also known as the Virginia deer, or simply as the whitetail, is a medium-sized deer native to the United States (all but five of the states), Canada, Mexico, Central America, and in South America as far south as Peru. The species is most common east of the Rocky Mountains, they are intermingled with a more robust species in the western United States (Odocoileus borealis) including Nevada, Utah, California, Hawaii, and Alaska (though its close relatives, the mule deer and black-tailed deer Odocoileus hemionus, can be found there). It does, however, survive in aspen parklands and deciduous river bottomlands within the central and northern Great Plains, and in mixed deciduous riparian corridors, river valley bottomlands, and lower foothills of the northern Rocky Mountain regions from Wyoming to southeastern British Columbia.

== Small mammals ==
=== Raccoons ===
Order: Carnivora Family: Procyonidae

- Raccoon, Procyon lotor, open forests, stream bottoms E W R

=== Badgers and weasels ===
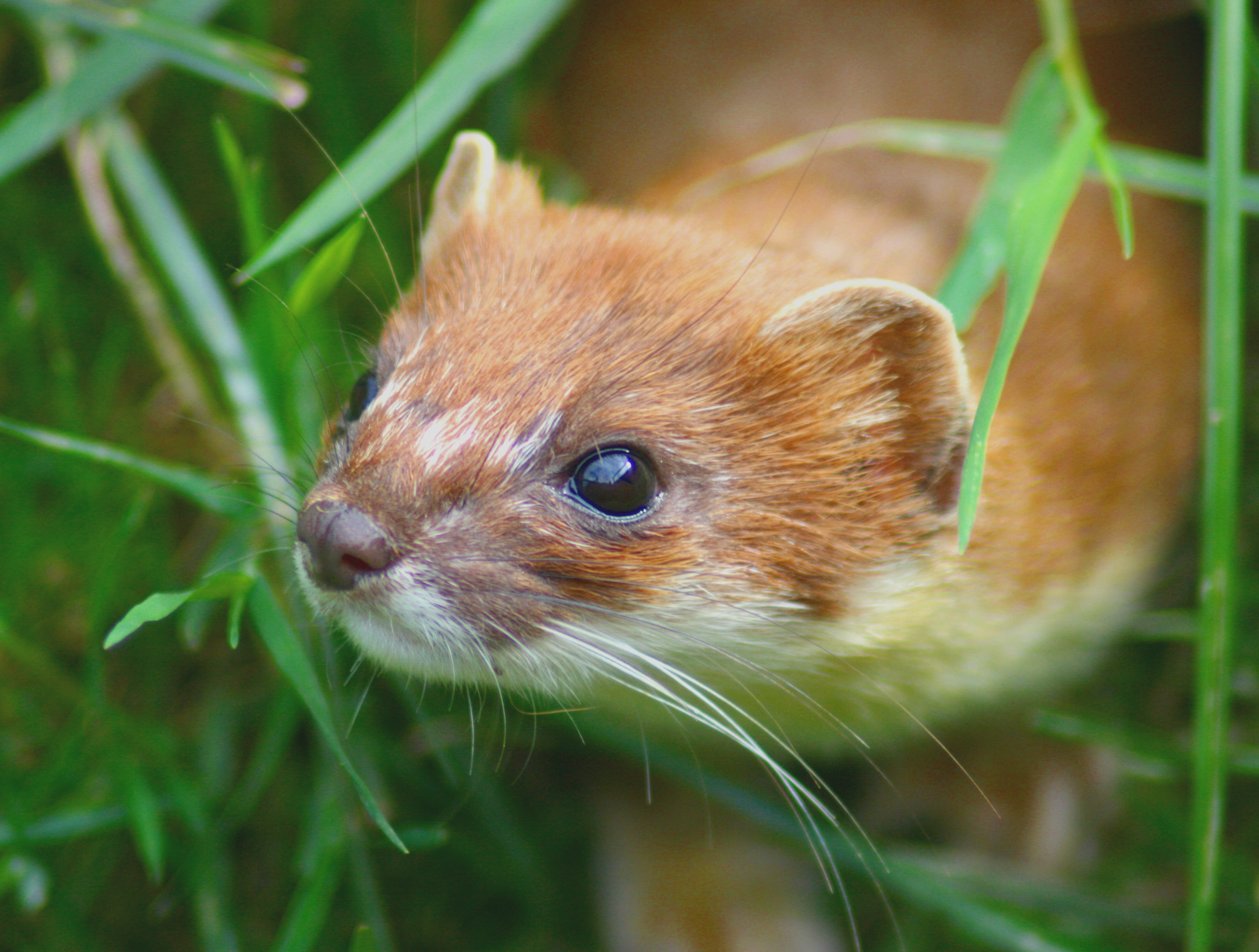
Short-tailed weasel

Order: Carnivora Family: Mustelidae

- Wolverine, Gulo gulo, coniferous forests and alpine meadows E W A
- Pacific marten, Martes caurina, coniferous forests, E W
- North American river otter, Lontra canadensis, rivers, lakes, ponds, E W
- Least weasel, Mustela nivalis, open forests and grasslands, E W R
- American ermine, Mustela richardsonii, coniferous forests and meadows, E W A
- Long-tailed weasel, Neogale frenata, open forests and meadows, E W A
- American mink, Neogale vison, creek and lake edges, E W
- Fisher, Pekania pennanti, coniferous forests, E W R
- American badger, Taxidea taxus, grasslands, E W

=== Skunks ===
Order: Carnivora Family: Mephitidae

- Striped skunk, Mephitis mephitis, open forests and grasslands, E W

=== Hares and rabbits ===
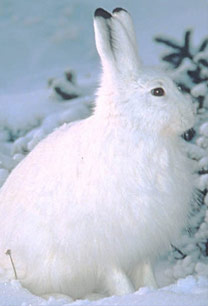
Snowshoe hare

Order: Lagomorpha Family: Leporidae

- Snowshoe hare, Lepus americanus, coniferous forests, E W
- White-tailed jackrabbit, Lepus townsendii, grasslands E R
- Mountain cottontail, Sylvilagus nuttallii, forests, brushy areas, E R

=== Pikas ===
Order: Lagomorpha Family: Ochotonidae

- American pika, Ochotona princeps, rocky slopes, E W A

=== Shrews ===
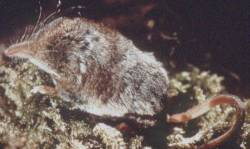
Masked shrew

Order: Soricomorpha Family: Soricidae

- Dusky shrew, Sorex monticolus, higher elevation coniferous forests, E W
- Masked shrew, Sorex cinereus, coniferous forests, meadows, ponds and stream edges, E W
- American water shrew, Sorex palustris, stream edges, E W
- Pygmy shrew, Sorex hoyi, dry open coniferous forests, W
- Vagrant shrew, Sorex vagrans, moist forests and grasslands, marsh and stream edges, E W A

=== Beaver ===
Order: Rodentia Family: Castoridae

- Beaver, Castor canadensis, ponds, streams, lakes, E W

=== Squirrels ===
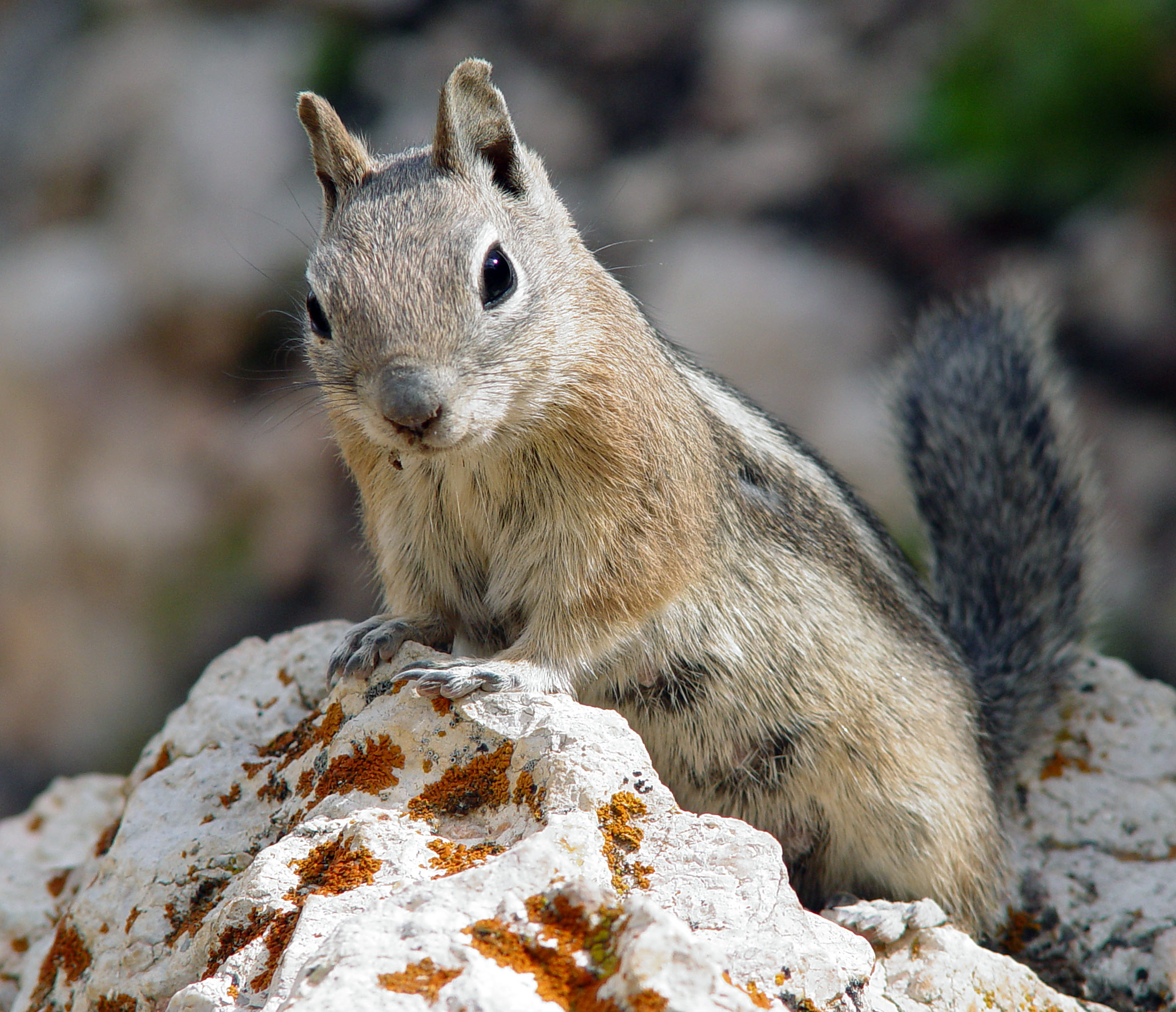
Golden-mantled ground squirrel

Order: Rodentia Family: Sciuridae

- Least chipmunk, Tamias minimus, high open forests, brushy, rocky areas, alpine meadows, E W A
- Yellow-pine chipmunk, Tamias amoenus, open forests, brushy, rocky areas, E W
- Red-tailed chipmunk, Eutamias ruficaudus, open forest, brushy, rocky areas, E W
- Hoary marmot, Marmota caligata, rocky areas, alpine meadows, E W A
- Yellow-bellied marmot, Marmota flaviventris, open rocky foothills, talus slopes, E R
- Golden-mantled ground squirrel, Spermophilus lateralis, high open forests, rocky areas, E W A
- Northern flying squirrel, Glaucomys sabrinus, coniferous forests, nocturnal, E W
- American red squirrel, Tamiasciurus hudsonicus, coniferous forests E W
- Richardson's ground squirrel, Spermophilus richardsonii, grasslands, E R
- Thirteen-lined ground squirrel, Spermophilus tridecemlineatus, grasslands, E R
- Columbian ground squirrel, Spermophilus columbianus, open woodlands, grasslands, alpine meadows, E W A

=== Pocket gophers ===
Order: Rodentia Family: Geomyidae

- Northern pocket gopher, Thomomys talpoides, meadows E W A

=== Mice ===
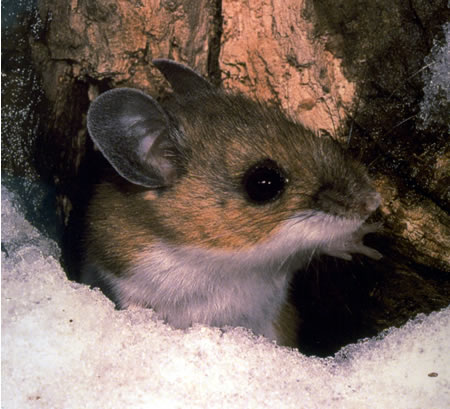
Deer mouse

Order: Rodentia Family: Cricetidae

- Deer mouse, Peromyscus maniculatus, forests, grasslands, alpine meadows, E W A
- Northern bog lemming, Synaptomys borealis, coniferous forests, W R

=== Jumping mice ===
Order: Rodentia Family: Dipodidae

- Western jumping mouse, Zapus princeps, grasslands, alpine meadows, E W A

=== Muskrats, voles and woodrats ===
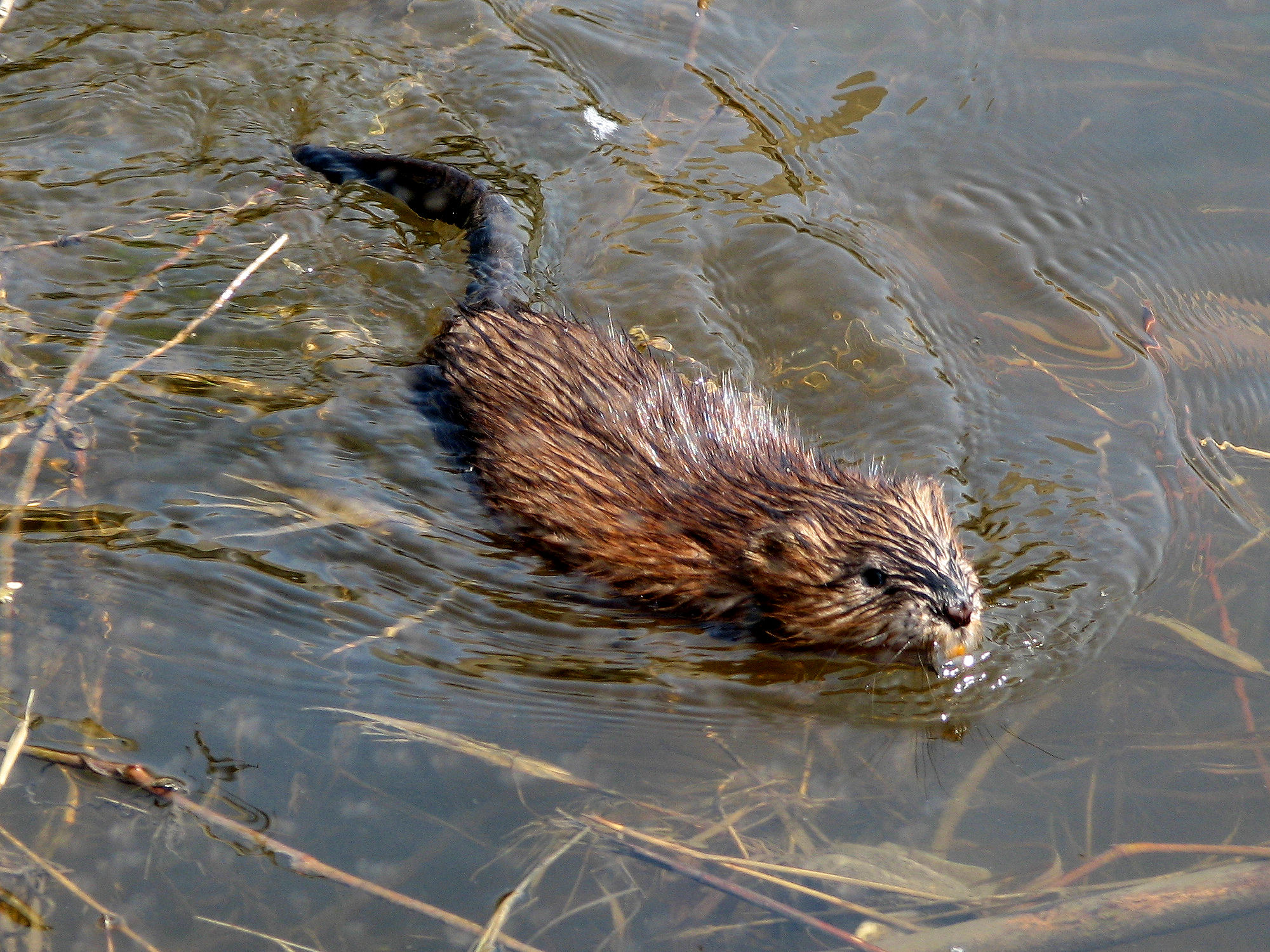
Muskrat

Order: Rodentia Family: Cricetidae

- Muskrat, Ondatra zibethicus, streams, lakes, marshy areas, E W
- Western heather vole, Phenacomys intermedius, coniferous forests, alpine meadows, E W A
- Long-tailed vole, Microtus longicaudus, coniferous forests, grasslands, E W
- Meadow vole, Microtus pennsylvanicus, open forests, meadows, along streams, marshy areas, E W
- Southern red-backed vole, Clethrionomys gapperi, coniferous forests, E W
- Water vole, Microtus richardsoni, high elevation stream and lake edges, E W A
- Bushy-tailed woodrat, Neotoma cinerea, rocky areas, old buildings, E W A

=== Porcupines ===
Order: Rodentia Family: Erethizontidae

- North American porcupine, Erethizon dorsatum, coniferous forests, E W R

=== Bats ===
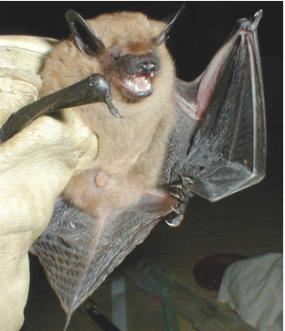
Big brown bat

Order: Chiroptera Family: Vespertilionidae

- Big brown bat, Eptesicus fuscus, coniferous forests, often around buildings, caves, E W
- Hoary bat, Lasiurus cinereus, coniferous forests, mostly nocturnal E W R
- Little brown bat, Myotis lucifugus, coniferous forests, often around buildings, caves, nocturnal E W
- Long-eared bat, Myotis evotis, coniferous forests, meadows, nocturnal E W A R
- Long-legged bat, Myotis volans, coniferous forests, meadows, nocturnal E W A
- Silver-haired bat, Lasionycteris noctivagans, coniferous forests, meadows, nocturnal E W
- Eastern red, Lasiurus borealis, E
- Yuma myotis, Myotis yumanensis, W
- California myotis, Myotis californicus, W

== See also ==
- Birds of Glacier National Park (U.S.)
- List of Glacier National Park (U.S.) related articles
