= Waskahegan Trail =

Walking/hiking trail that runs through and around Edmonton, Alberta, Canada

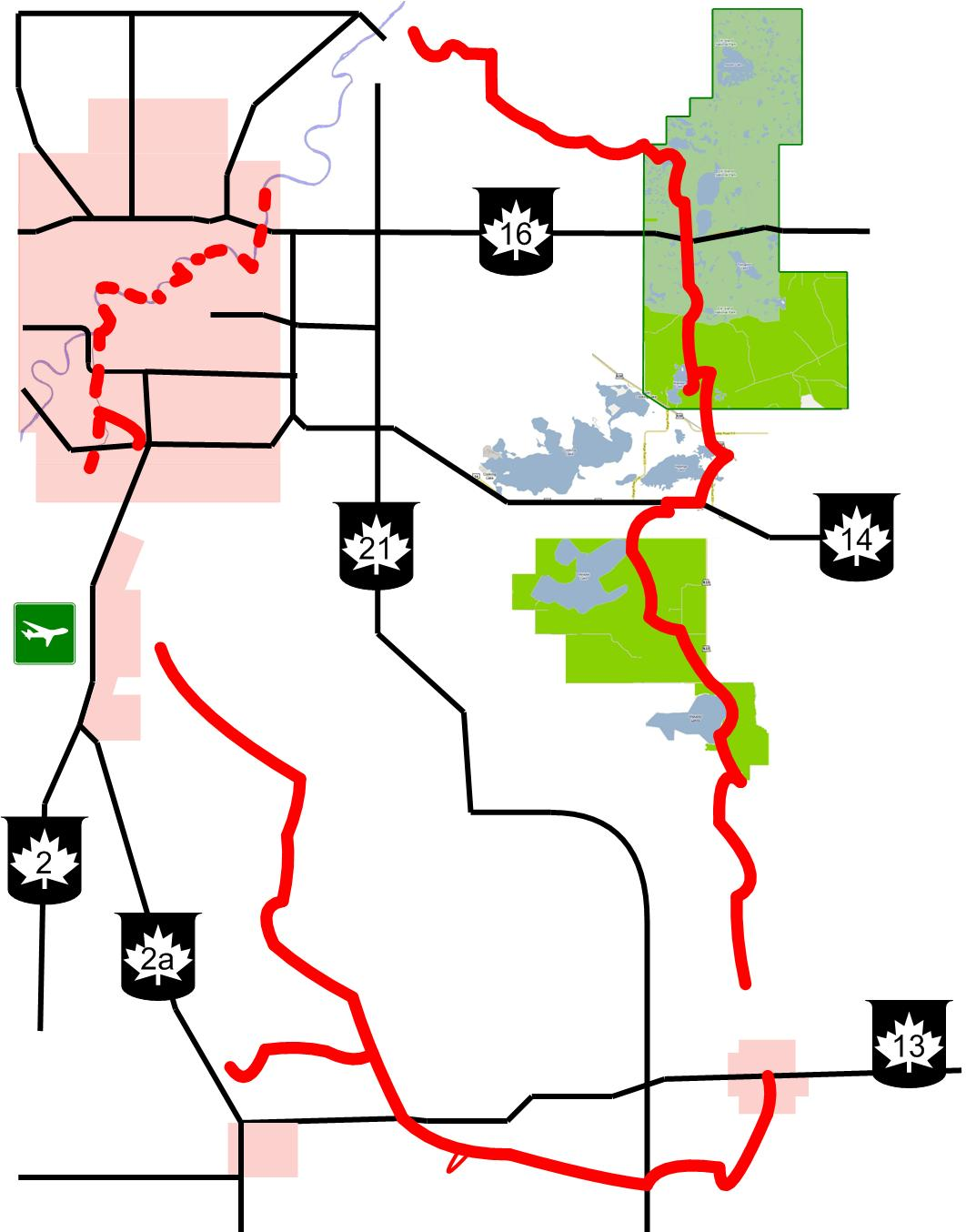
A map of the current Waskahegan hiking trail route circa 2007. The city of Edmonton is pictured at the top left of the map.

The Waskahegan Trail is a walking/hiking trail that runs through and around Edmonton, Alberta, Canada. It is 309 kilometres (192 mi) and runs through a mix of public and private land. Landowners are paid nothing. Their permission is given on the understanding that it can be withdrawn at any time for any reason. The trail is managed by a volunteer board, the Waskahegan Trail Association (WTA).

== History ==
The beginnings of the trail started in 1967 with Fred Dorward, the trail's founder, pitching the idea to the Oil Capital Kiwanis group who provided funding and support. Other people and organizations involved at this time were the Edmonton Regional Planning Commission, Edmonton Parks and Recreation, the Alberta Department of Youth, Alberta Public Works, the Canadian Hostelling Association, the Scouts Association, Alberta Travel, Elk Island National Park and Grant MacEwan.

The trail was named in a contest in 1967 by D.B. Remington. Waskaheegan is Plains Cree for "house", in reference to the nearby Fort Edmonton trading post. At the same time in 1967, the Regional Trails Committee was formed to promote the trail in the Edmonton Journal and set up the group's bylaws. WTA was 'born' at 7:40 pm, March 20, 1969, at a meetings of the Regional Trails Committee. Work in earnest began in 1973 with 100 kilometres (62 mi) of trail being built and the first guide book published.

== Route ==
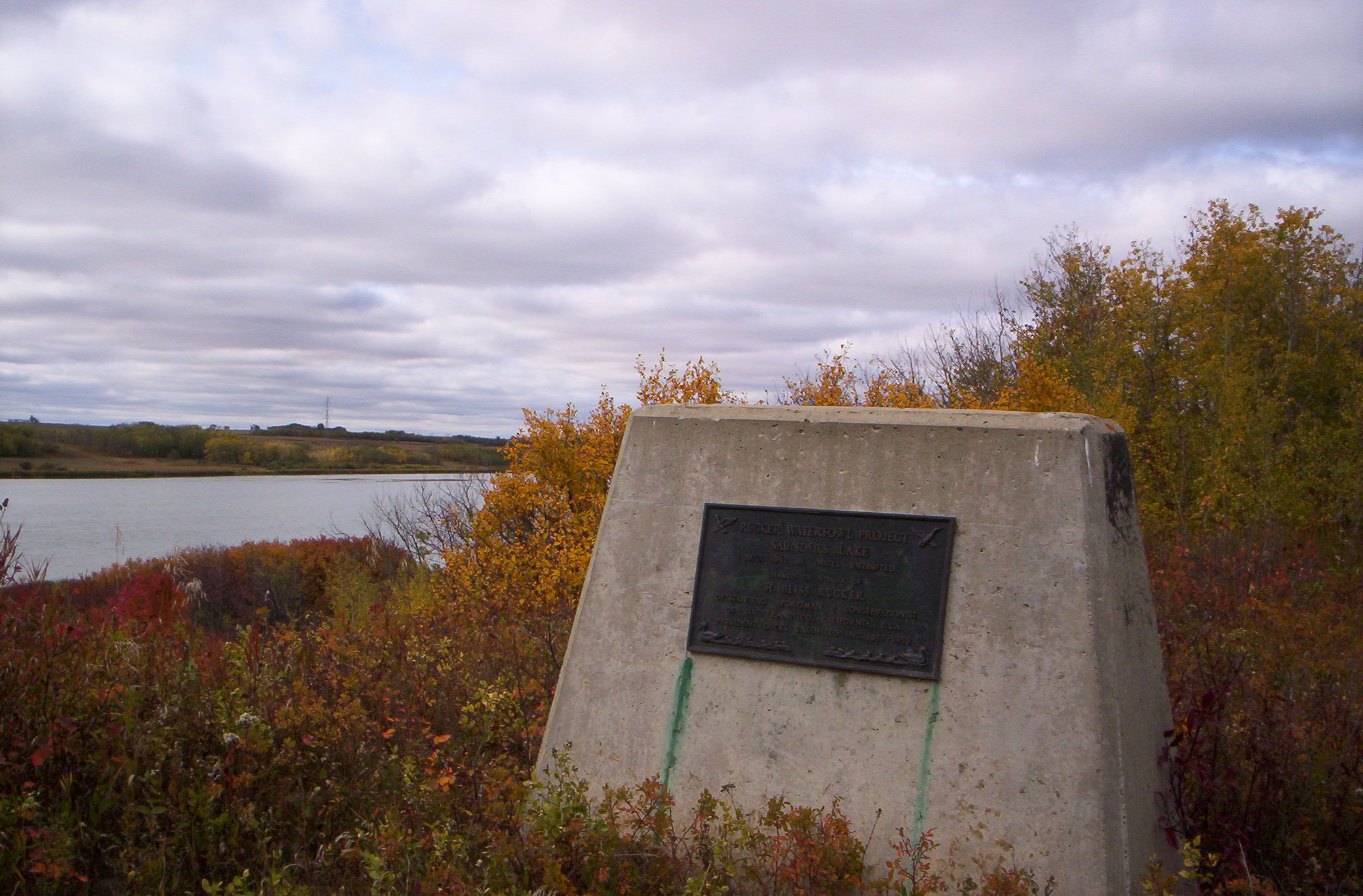
The Ducks Unlimited Monument as seen from the Saunders Lake section of the trail

View from the Gwynne Valley

The trail is more or less circular in shape.

Within the city of Edmonton, the trail takes advantage of the extensive set of trails and walkways within the North Saskatchewan River valley parks system. Taking this as an arbitrary starting point (for this article), the Waskahegan Trail starts in northeast Edmonton's Bannerman neighbourhood, where the city's North Hermitage Park trail starts near the intersection of the North Saskatchewan River and 144 Avenue. From this point it runs southwest through the North Saskatchewan River valley parks system, diverting from this system at the Whitemud Creek, progressing in a more southerly direction along the Whitemud until it intersects Blackmud Creek, continuing south until exiting to street level at Ellerslie Road, the first gap in the trail.

The trail picks up at Saunders Lake, directly east of Edmonton International Airport. From there, it continues south to Coal Lake, which feeds into the Battle River in the Wetaskiwin area. From here, the trail turns east along the Battle River from Gwynne towards Driedmeat Lake, but before reaching the lake, it turns north to Camrose. North of Camrose is the second gap, with the trail picking up again at Miquelon Lake Provincial Park, continuing north through the Ministik Lake Bird Sanctuary, the Hastings Lake area, and the Cooking Lake–Blackfoot Recreation Area to Elk Island National Park. From Elk Island, the trail turns west along Ross Creek to Fort Saskatchewan. The third and final gap is between Fort Saskatchewan and the starting point in Edmonton.

== Trees and tall shrubs in the Waskahegan area ==
Conifers
Deciduous trees
- White spruce
- Black spruce
- Jack pine
- Tamarack

- Trembling aspen
- White poplar
- Balsam poplar
- White birch
- Water birch
- River alder
- Green alder
- Saskatoon
- Pin cherry
- Choke cherry
- High-bush cranberry
- Canadian buffaloberry
- Red osier dogwood
- Silverberry
- Beaked hazelnut
- Willow
- Hawthorn
- Manitoba maple
- Caragana

== Mammals of the Waskahegan area ==
Shrews
- Masked shrew
- Arctic shrew
- Pygmy shrew
- Water shrew
- Prairie shrew
Hares
- Snowshoe hare
- White-tailed jackrabbit
Bats
- Little brown bat/Big brown bat
- Hoary bat
- Silver-haired bat
Rodents

- Least chipmunk
- Woodchuck
- Richardson's ground squirrel ("gopher")
- Striped gopher
- Red squirrel
- Northern flying squirrel
- Northern pocket gopher
- Beaver
- Deer mouse
- Northern bog lemming
- Southern red-backed vole
- Meadow vole
- Prairie vole
- Jumping mouse
- Western jumping mouse
- Muskrat
- Porcupine

Carnivores

- Red fox
- Raccoon
- Long-tailed weasel
- Ermine
- Least weasel
- Mink
- Badger
- Striped skunk
- Canada lynx
- Coyote

Ungulates
- White tailed deer
- Mule deer
- Bison
- Elk
