= Driedmeat Lake (Alberta) =

- Location of Driedmeat Lake in Alberta
- Location: Camrose County, Alberta
- Coordinates: 52°51′53″N 112°44′59″W
- Type: Lake
- Primary inflows: Battle River
- Primary outflows: Battle River
- Basin countries: Canada
- Max. length: 15.6 km (9.7 mi)
- Max. width: 0.9 km (0.56 mi)
- Surface area: 16.5 km^{2} (6.4 sq mi)
- Average depth: 2.2 m (7 ft 3 in)
- Max. depth: 3.7 m (12 ft)
- Water volume: 41,900,000 m^{3} (1.48×10^{9} cu ft)
- Residence time: 0.25 years
- Shore length^{1}: 41.2 km (25.6 mi)
- Surface elevation: 684.44 m (2,245.5 ft)
- Settlements: Tillicum Beach
- ^{1} Shore length is not a well-defined measure.

Driedmeat Lake (also sometimes spelt Dried Meat Lake) is a long ribbon lake in Alberta; part of the Battle River system. Its northern end is located approximately 10 km (6.2 mi) south of the city of Camrose. The city draws its water supply from the lake. It was originally created by a glacial meltwater channel, which carved the surrounding valley. In the valley and around it, Saskatoon berries, an ingredient of pemmican, grow and are endemic in the area.

== Origin ==
Driedmeat Lake is in one of the glacial meltwater channels (the North Saskatchewan River follows another) formed when the 4,000 km^{2} (1,500 sq mi) of Lake Edmonton, which existed for roughly 100 years at the end of the last ice age, breached its ice dam and drained within a few weeks. The entire meltwater channel starts east of Nisku, wandering southeast through minor depressions and the chain of Saunders Lake, Ord Lake, three small unnamed lakes, Coal Lake and Driedmeat Lake. Pipestone Creek flows through the southern end of Coal Lake, draining that lake into the Battle River, which then flows into the northern end of Driedmeat Lake, which then drains Driedmeat Lake through its southern end.

== History ==
Before Europeans settled on the land, the Blackfoot tribe and Cree natives would use the area around the lake to camp and hunt. The resulting name of "Driedmeat" comes from the Cree word for drying Bison meat and making pemmican. A nearby hill was the origin of the lake's name, the hill's name itself is Driedmeat. Which is now disrupted by gravel extraction operations.

In 1885, Joseph Tyrrell described a Metis settlement of forty families along the Battle River four miles from Driedmeat lake. They lived in "substantial log houses." Their cultivation of crops allowed them to be self-sustaining. Crops included wheat, barley, oats, potatoes, turnips, and Indian corn. Live stock included horses, cattle and sheep; all healthy, Tyrrell observed.

== Natural history ==
Driedmeat Lake is considered a highly eutrophic lake.

=== Flora ===
The most common aquatic plant of Driedmeat Lake is a blue-green algal bloom. Aquatic macrophytes are another notable feature of Driedmeat Lake, especially in the northern and southern thirds of the lake. Aquatic plants form mats on the surface and make it difficult for boats to travel.

Fourteen species of aquatic macrophytes were identified by Alberta Environment during a 1984 survey of Driedmeat Lake. The most abundant plants were pondweeds (Potamogeton richardsonii, P. vaginatus and P. pectinatus) and coontail (Ceratophyllum demersum).

=== Fauna ===
Driedmeat Lake provides important nesting habitat for waterfowl and is an important fall staging area for swans and Canada geese. Flocks of White Pelicans feed on the lake.

In 1939, the provincial government was petitioned to have the lake classified as a bird sanctuary (Gould 1939). The region is now a Restricted Wildlife Area, which means that hunting of waterfowl and upland game birds is not allowed within 0.8 km of the lake until 1 November each year. From November until the end of hunting season, hunting is permitted to encourage waterfowl to continue their migration.

Frank Farley published the Birds of the Battle River Region in 1932. He owned a farm located alongside Driedmeat Lake. He writes of his own sighting of birds on his property.

==== Fish ====
Driedmeat Lake is popular for angling for northern pike in summer and for ice-fishing in winter. Other species found in the lake include longnose dace, lake chub, emerald shiner, spottail shiner, white sucker and brook stickleback. Fish and Wildlife officials estimate that there are 46,800 ± 18,000 pike in the lake.

== Resources use ==
Driedmeat Lake provides water for the city of Camrose. On a typical day, the people of Camrose use 5.5 million litres of water. In 2010, the level of the lake was raised just over half a meter. A new steel sheet piling weir was constructed directly upstream from the existing weir. The total cost of the project, including changes to the existing fishway, constructing of a new public access road and parking lot, was $1,178,431.15.
