= Tillicum Beach =

- Hamlet
- Location of Tillicum Beach Tillicum Beach (Canada)
- Coordinates: 52°52′38″N 112°45′16″W
- Country: Canada
- Province: Alberta
- Region: Central Alberta
- Census division: 10
- Municipal district: Camrose County

Government
  - Type: Unincorporated
  - Governing body: Camrose County Council

Area (2021)
  - Land: 0.4 km^{2} (0.15 sq mi)

Population (2021)
  - Total: 130
  - Density: 324.8/km^{2} (841/sq mi)
- Time zone: UTC−06:00 (Alberta Time)
- Area codes: 780, 587, 825

Tillicum Beach is a hamlet in central Alberta, Canada within Camrose County. It is 3 kilometres (1.9 mi) west Highway 56, approximately 16 kilometres (9.9 mi) southeast of Camrose. It is located along Driedmeat Lake.

== Toponymy ==
Tillicum Beach is likely named after a settlement of the same name in British Columbia, itself derived from the word tilikum in Chinook Jargon (meaning "people" or "friend").

== Topography ==
Tillicum Beach is located on the eastern shore of Driedmeat Lake, part of the Battle River network. The water around Tillicum has a maximum depth of 3.7 metres, and may contain flukes during the summer. North of Tillicum Beach is Beesley’s Spring, a natural freshwater spring that flows throughout the year.

=== Flora and fauna ===
Saskatoon berry shrubs grow in the area, though their abundance has been impacted by the presence of a gravel mine.

Tillicum Beach's lake is home to fish species such as the northern pike, longnose dace, lake chub, white sucker, and brook stickleback. It also contains emerald and spot tail shiners. Migratory birds, including snow geese and swans, use the lake as a rest stop and are protected by a Restricted Wildlife Area Designation. White pelicans, bald eagles, and double-crested cormorants also frequent the area.

== History ==
=== Pre-hamlet ===
The river beside Tillicum Beach marked a traditional division of territory between the Cree in the east and the Blackfoot in the west. Saskatoon berries growing in the area were traditionally used by Cree people to make pemmican. From the early 1900s until the 1940s, settlers established several farms in the area.

=== Tillicum Beach: 1940-present ===
The origins of Tillicum Beach as a permanent settlement lie in the late 1940s, when Edmonton-based developers operating as the Tillicum Development Corporation attempted to establish a resort there. The development centred on an artificial beach, constituted of 15,000 cubic feet of sand.

By the end of the decade, the corporation included lawyer Joseph Shoctor and Tom Cleary of the Edmonton Eskimos. A dance hall opened in early 1950, followed soon after by a miniature golf course in June. The corporation sold waterfront properties, and also planned to introduce amenities including a private runway.

Although the corporation's ambitious plans did not come to fruition, a hamlet developed in the area nonetheless. By 1958, Tillicum Beach was an established attraction for camping, swimming, and fishing. In 2005, Tillicum Beach reportedly had a permanent population of around 112 residents. A $1.75 million paving project to reinforce the roads around Tillicum Beach was completed in 2014, and further upgrades were undertaken by Camrose County in 2025.

== Demographics ==
In the 2021 Census of Population conducted by Statistics Canada, Tillicum Beach had a population of 130 living in 58 of its 70 total private dwellings, a change of −32.6% from its 2016 population of 193. With a land area of 0.4 km^{2} (0.15 sq mi), it had a population density of 325.0/km^{2} (841.7/sq mi) in 2021.

As a designated place in the 2016 Census of Population conducted by Statistics Canada, Tillicum Beach had a population of 179 living in 69 of its 85 total private dwellings, a change of 70.5% from its 2011 population of 105. With a land area of 0.48 km^{2} (0.19 sq mi), it had a population density of 372.9/km^{2} (965.8/sq mi) in 2016.

== Amenities ==
As of 2026, Tillicum Beach offers facilities for camping, boating, and playing outdoor sports. It is a popular destination for anglers. The locality also contains a ball diamond, playground, and picnic shelter.

== See also ==
- List of communities in Alberta
- List of hamlets in Alberta
