= Pipestone =

Pipestone may refer to:

== Places ==
=== Canada ===
- Pipestone, Alberta
- Pipestone, Manitoba
- Pipestone No. 92, Saskatchewan, Canada, a former name of the Rural Municipality of Walpole No. 92
- Pipestone Creek, in central Alberta, Canada
- Pipestone Creek (Saskatchewan), river that flows from Saskatchewan into Manitoba
- Pipestone Pass (Alberta), a pass in Banff National Park, Alberta (see List of passes of the Rocky Mountains)
- Pipestone River (disambiguation), any of several rivers or creeks in Canada
- Pipestone Lake (Saskatchewan), a lake in southern Saskatchewan
- Rural Municipality of Pipestone, Manitoba
- Pipestone (electoral district), Saskatchewan

=== United States ===
- Pipestone Township, Michigan
- Pipestone, Minnesota
- Pipestone County, Minnesota
- Pipestone Pass (Montana), a pass on the Continental Divide of the Americas in Montana
- Pipestone National Monument, located near Pipestone, Minnesota
- Pipestone Region, in southwest Minnesota
- Pipestone Creek (Big Sioux River tributary)

== Other uses ==
- Catlinite, a type of red, carvable rock used by Native Americans for pipes and effigies
- Pipestone Area High School, the public high school in Pipestone, Minnesota
- Pipestone Area School District, the public school district serving the community of Pipestone
