= Pipestone River =

Pipestone River or Creek may refer to:

== Canada ==
- Pipestone Creek, a waterway in central Alberta near Millet, Alberta
- Pipestone Creek and Fossil Bed near Grande Prairie, Alberta
- Pipestone River (Kenora District), a tributary of the Winisk River
  - North Pipestone River (Ontario), a river of Ontario and a tributary of the above
- Pipestone River (Rainy River District), a river of Ontario in the Nelson River watershed
- Pipestone Creek (Saskatchewan), a river in Saskatchewan and Manitoba
- Pipestone River, a tributary of the Cree River in Saskatchewan

== Other places ==
- Little Pipestone Creek, in Jefferson County, Montana, U.S.

== See also ==
- Pipestone (disambiguation)
- Pipestone River Provincial Park, a protected area of Ontario
