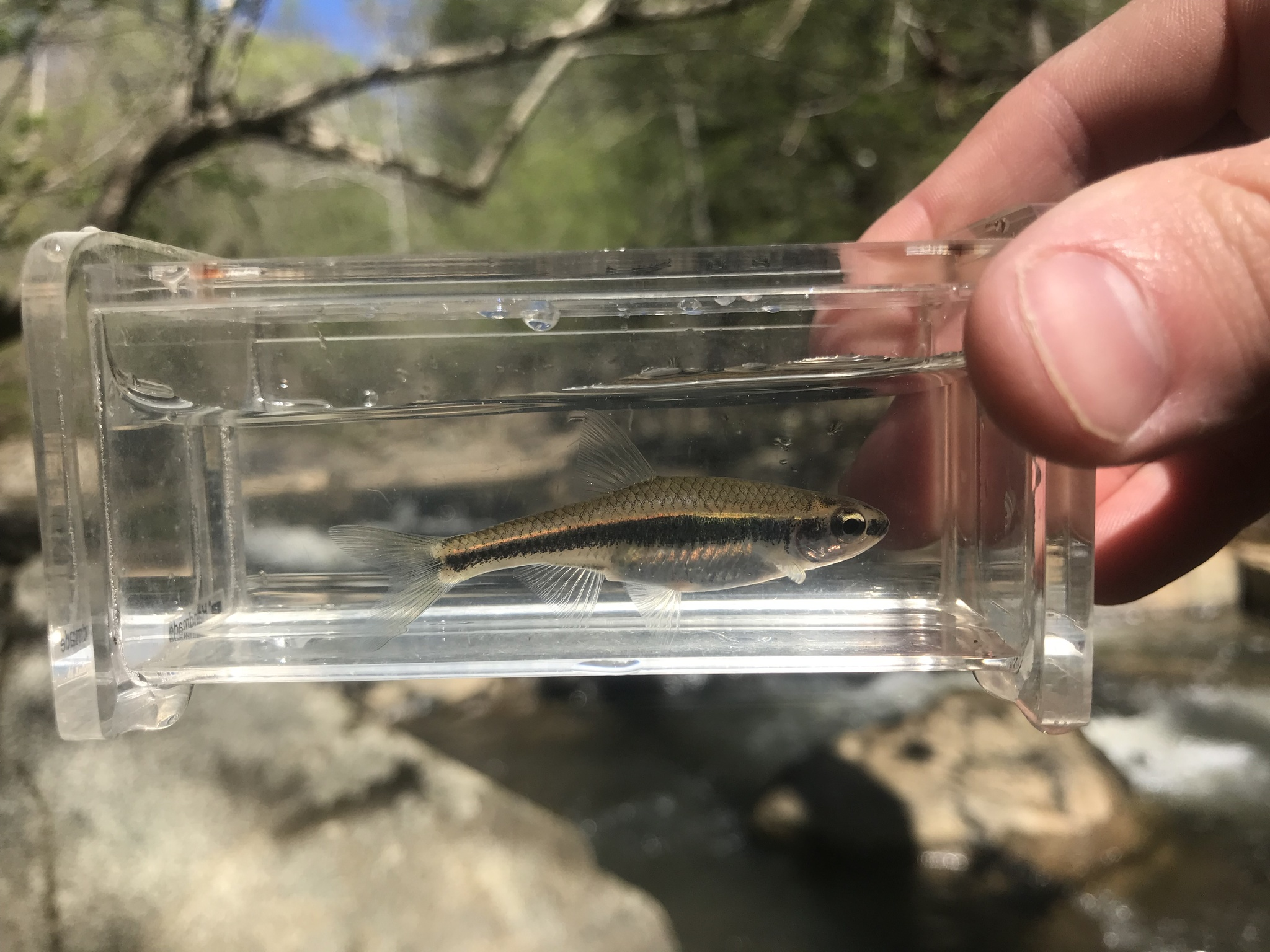

Conservation status
- Least Concern (IUCN 3.1)

Scientific classification
- Kingdom: Animalia
- Phylum: Chordata
- Class: Actinopterygii
- Order: Cypriniformes
- Family: Leuciscidae
- Subfamily: Pogonichthyinae
- Genus: Hudsonius
- Species: H. altipinnis

Binomial name
- Hudsonius altipinnis (Cope, 1870)

Synonyms
- Alburnellus altipinnis Cope, 1870; Notropis altipinnis (Cope, 1870); Notropis altipinnis chowanus C. L. Hubbs & Raney, 1948; Notropis altipinnis neusensis C. L. Hubbs & Raney, 1948; Notropis altipinnis tarensis C. L. Hubbs & Raney, 1948; Notropis altipinnis whitei C. L. Hubbs & Raney, 1948; Notropis altipinnis wrighti C. L. Hubbs & Raney, 1948

= Highfin shiner =

Species of fish

The highfin shiner (Hudsonius altipinnis) is a species of freshwater ray-finned fish belonging to the family Leuciscidae, the shiners, daces and minnows. It is endemic to the United States, where it is found in the lower Roanoke River drainage from southeastern Virginia, south in Piedmont and Coastal Plain areas to the middle Savannah River drainage in South Carolina.
