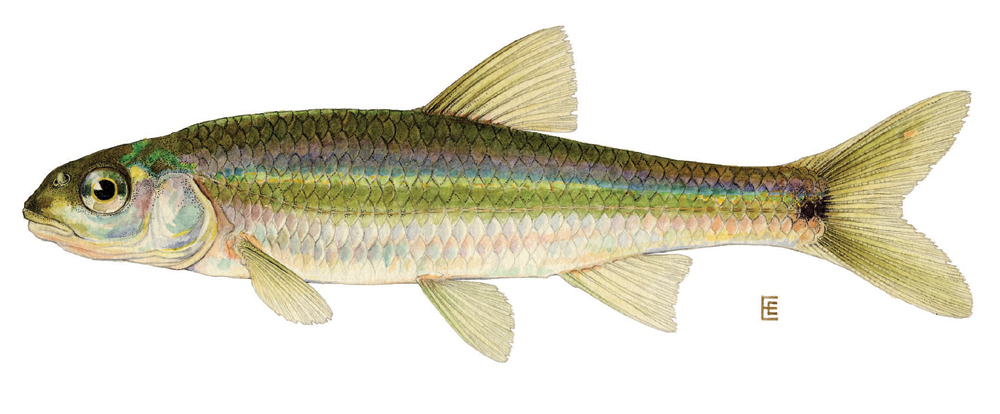
- Spottail shiner (Hudsonius hudsonius)

Scientific classification
- Kingdom: Animalia
- Phylum: Chordata
- Class: Actinopterygii
- Order: Cypriniformes
- Family: Leuciscidae
- Subfamily: Pogonichthyinae
- Genus: Hudsonius; Girard, 1856

Type species
- Hudsonius fluviatilis Girard, 1856

= Hudsonius =

Genus of fish

Hudosnius is a genus of freshwater ray-finned fishes belonging to the family Leuciscidae, the shiners, daces and minnows. This fishes in this genus are found in North America.

== Species ==
Hudsonius contains the following species:

- Hudsonius altipinnis (Cope, 1870) (Highfin shiner)
- Hudsonius hudsonius (Clinton, 1824) (Spottail shiner)
