= Coal Lake (Alberta) =

Lake in Alberta, Canada

- Location within Alberta
- Location: County of Wetaskiwin No. 10 / Leduc County, Alberta
- Coordinates: 53°04′29″N 113°16′17″W
- Primary inflows: Pipestone Creek
- Primary outflows: Pipestone Creek
- Basin countries: Canada
- Max. length: 11 km (6.8 mi)
- Max. width: 0.66 km (0.41 mi)
- Surface area: 10.9 km^{2} (4.2 sq mi)
- Average depth: 3.5 m (11 ft)
- Max. depth: 5.5 m (18 ft)
- Surface elevation: 719 m (2,359 ft)
- Settlements: Wetaskiwin
- References: Atlas of Alberta

Coal Lake is a long, sinuous lake located approximately 60 km (37 mi) southeast of the city of Edmonton, just northeast of the city of Wetaskiwin. The lake is in one of the glacial meltwater channels (the North Saskatchewan River follows another) formed when the 4,000 km^{2} (1,500 sq mi) of Lake Edmonton, which existed for roughly 100 years at the end of the last ice age, breached its ice dam and drained within a few weeks. The entire meltwater channel starts east of Nisku, wandering southeast through minor depressions and the chain of Saunders Lake, Ord Lake, three small unnamed lakes, Coal Lake and Driedmeat Lake.

Coal Lake starts east of Kavanagh, Alberta, and ends at a dam built 2 kilometres (1.2 miles) northwest of Gwynne, Alberta. Since construction of the dam in 1972, Pipestone Creek flows through the southern end of Coal Lake, draining the lake into the Battle River, 10 kilometres (6.2 miles) southeast of Coal Lake.

Coal Lake was named in 1892 by J.D.A. Fitzpatrick, a Dominion Land Surveyor, for the coal beds present in many places along the northeast shore.

== See also ==
- List of lakes of Alberta
