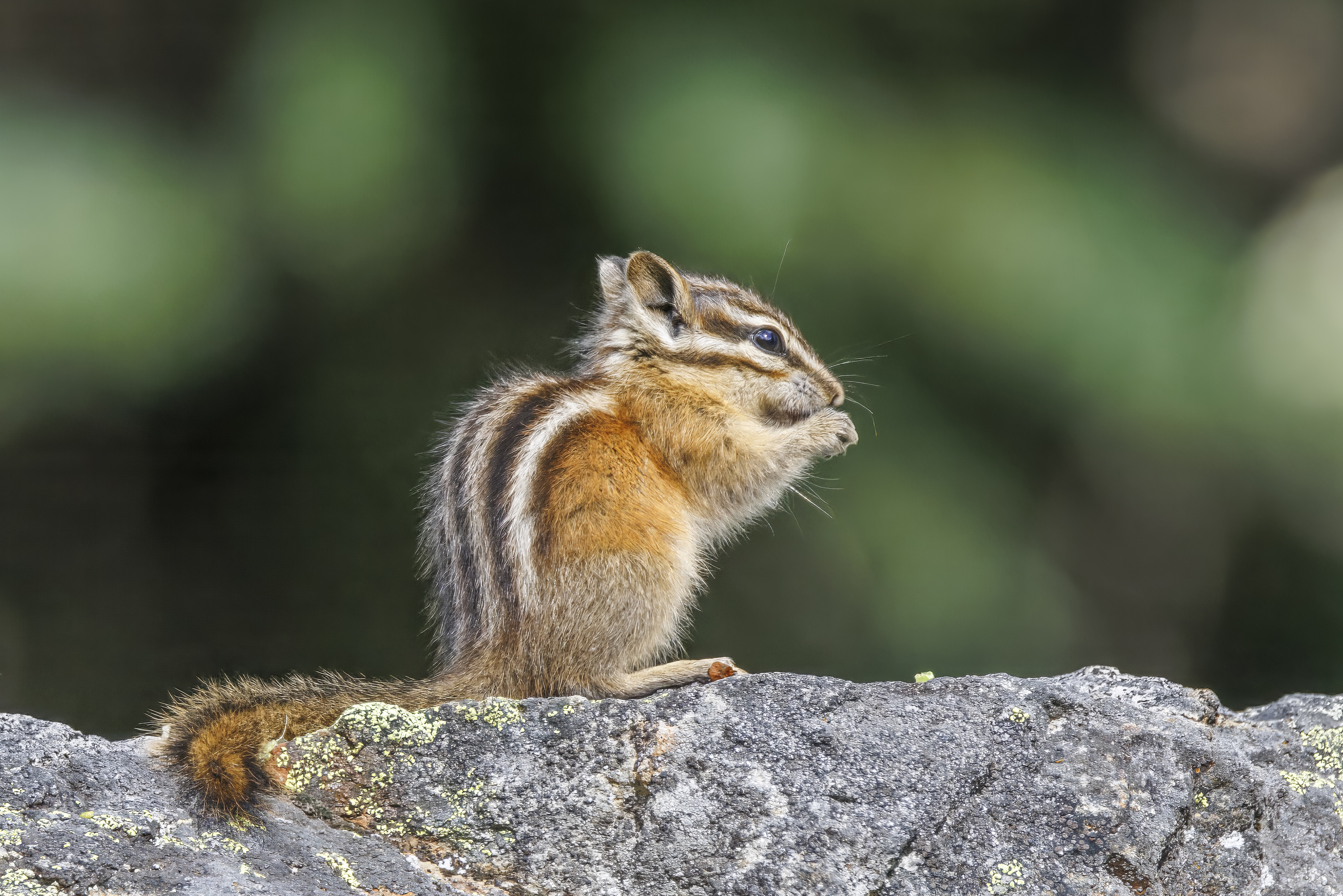
- Hollister's chipmunk (N. a. ludibundus); Mount Rainier National Park, WA

Conservation status
- Least Concern (IUCN 3.1)

Scientific classification
- Kingdom: Animalia
- Phylum: Chordata
- Class: Mammalia
- Order: Rodentia
- Family: Sciuridae
- Genus: Neotamias
- Species: N. amoenus

Binomial name
- Neotamias amoenus (J. A. Allen, 1890)
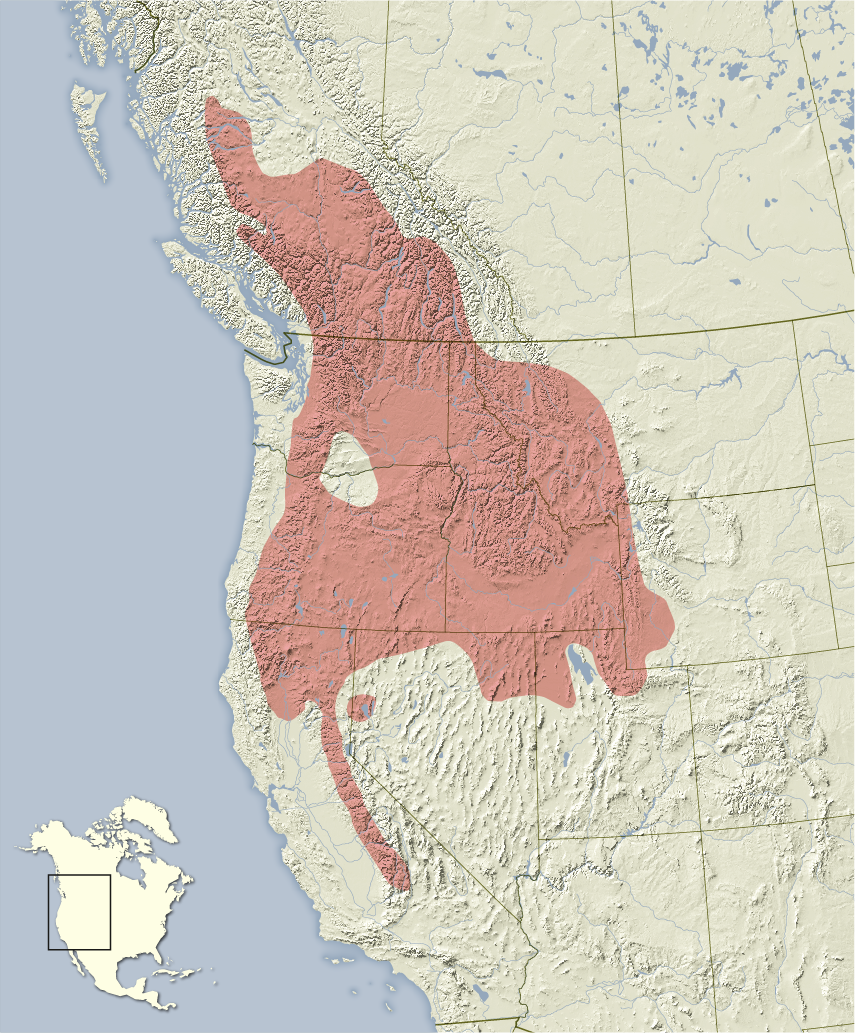

Synonyms
- Tamias amoenus J.A. Allen, 1890

= Yellow-pine chipmunk =

Species of rodent

Olympic Chipmunk (N. a. caurinus) Olympic National Park, WA

The yellow-pine chipmunk (Neotamias amoenus) is a species of order Rodentia in the family Sciuridae. It is found in parts of Canada and the United States.

These chipmunks are normally found in brush-covered areas, and in California, they inhabit an elevation range of around 975 to 2,900 metres (3,200 to 9,510 ft).

== Description ==
Their body color is dark and reddish, mixed with cinnamon, with five longitudinal dark (black or mixed black) stripes that are separated by four lighter stripes. The outer pair of pale stripes is creamy white and narrower, and the more median pair is a gray or smoke gray. The sides of the head each have three dark stripes, with two lighter in between, and the crown is black or smoke gray.

Males and females have similar brain size and roughly the same tail length, ear length from notch, and length of lower tooth row, but females are larger in other body measurements; average body mass varies, with large males weighing an average of 49.7 g (1.75 oz) and large females averaging 53.5 g (1.89 oz). Though male-biased size sexual dimorphism is common among mammals, N. amoenus exhibits female-biased dimorphism.

In some areas, where range overlap with the least chipmunk or red-tailed chipmunk occurs, it may be difficult or impossible to distinguish the species in the field; laboratory examination of skeletal structures may be required.

== Feeding ==
Yellow-pine chipmunks are seed-storing hibernators whose fitness in winter and spring seasons is influenced by the availability of resources and their foraging behaviors in the summer and autumn. Since they do not build body fat before hibernation, their larder, or winter food supply they have built, serves as a measure for their likelihood of survival through the winter, and of their reproductive success come spring. During the warm, active season, the chipmunks gather accessible seeds and scatter-hoard the seeds in various caches, only to retrieve them later for their larder. N. amoenus avoids cache overlap with its loads, and mean nearest-neighbor distance ranges from 1.4–4.9 m (4.6–16.1 ft); these distances between caches increases the farther N. amoenus gets from its food source.

== Reproduction ==
Both sexes have genital bones; males possess a baculum and females a baubellum. After hibernation, one annual breeding event takes place in late April/early May; male testes sizes are enlarged at this time (bolstered by the warmer temperatures); similarly, enlargement of female ovaries and uteri is also seen. The females are in estrus for one day, and 3 to 5 days prior they make vocalizations, making males aware of their readiness to reproduce and eliciting intrasexual selection among males. The female mates with one or more of the males that has come to her den. The average litter number is around four or five and birth occurs late May/early June; in a litter of six, young are smaller, suggesting physical constraints on the mother; the lactation period lasts about 2 months, and by beginning of September, the young are of comparable size to others in the population. Female reproductive success has been observed to be significantly related to body size, whereas male reproductive success is independent of size.
