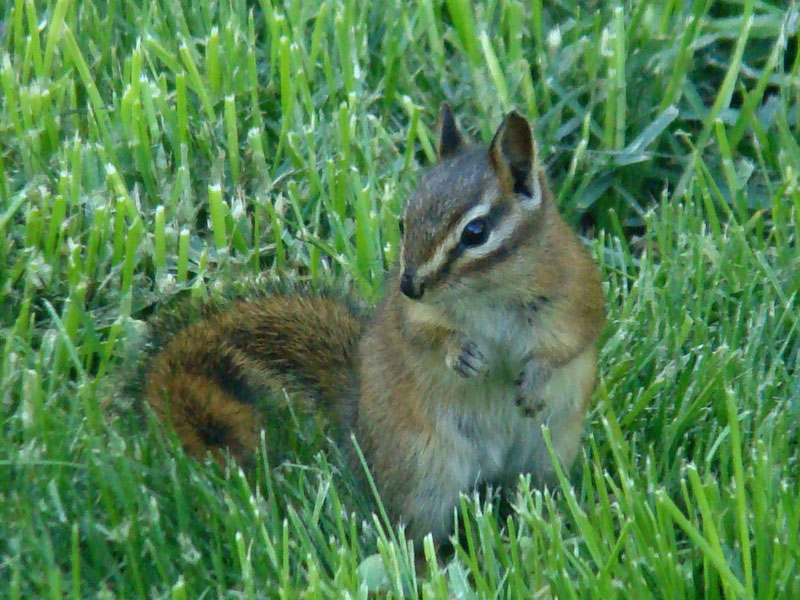

Conservation status
- Least Concern (IUCN 3.1)

- Apparently Secure (NatureServe)

Scientific classification
- Kingdom: Animalia
- Phylum: Chordata
- Class: Mammalia
- Order: Rodentia
- Family: Sciuridae
- Genus: Neotamias
- Species: N. ruficaudus

Binomial name
- Neotamias ruficaudus (A. H. Howell, 1920)
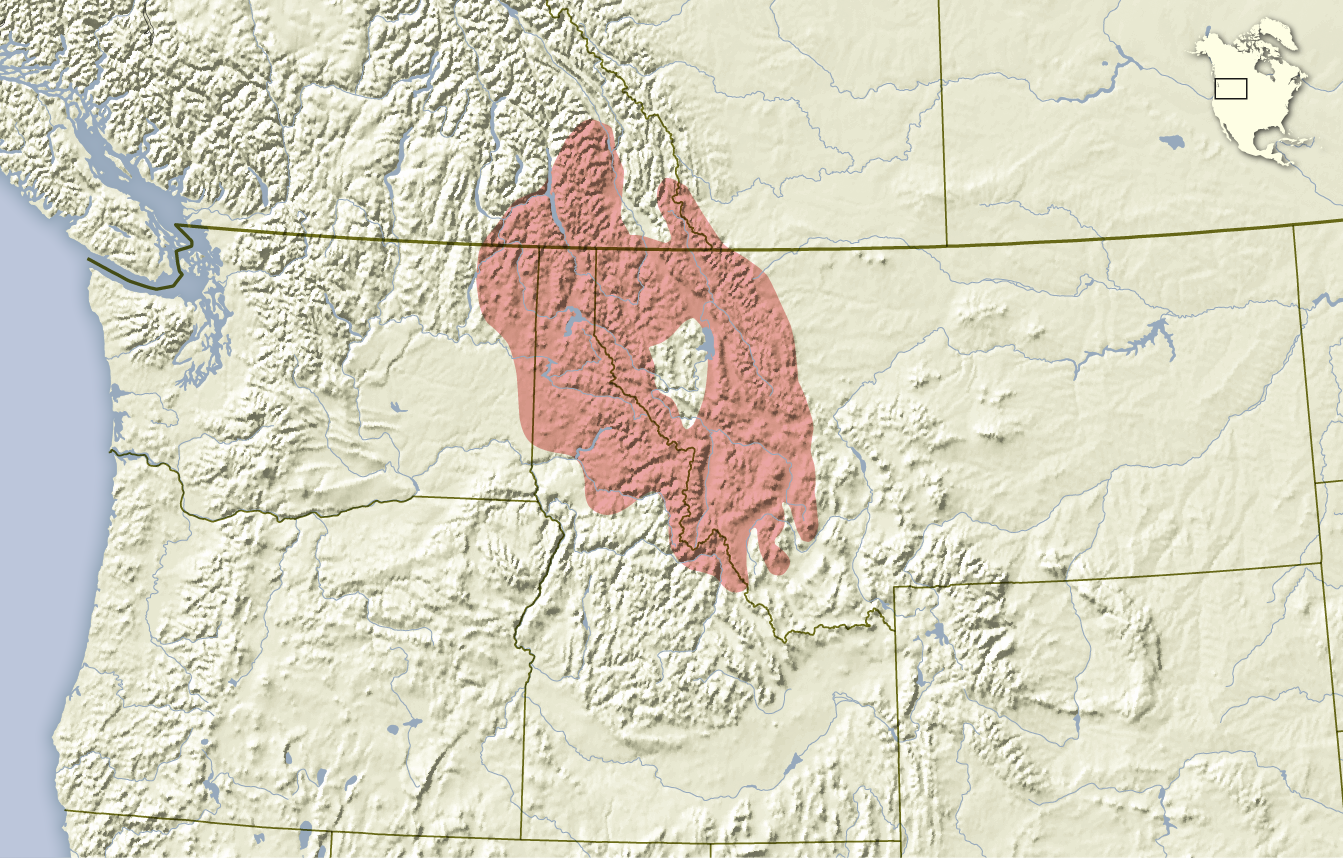

Synonyms
- Tamias ruficaudus

= Red-tailed chipmunk =

Species of rodent

The red-tailed chipmunk (Neotamias ruficaudus) is a species of rodent in the family Sciuridae. It is found in Alberta and British Columbia in Canada and Montana, Idaho and Washington in the United States.

== Description ==
The red-tailed chipmunk is a large species with a total length of about 230 mm (9 in) including a bushy tail of 105 mm (4 in). The mass varies from about 54 g (1.9 oz) in the spring to 60 g (2.1 oz) in the fall. Females are marginally larger than males. The head is mottled grayish-brown with dark stripes above, through and below the eye. The body is basically orange-brown with five blackish stripes separated by four pale gray, tawny or cream-colored ones. The shoulders, sides, rump and flanks are tawny or buff. The underparts are creamy-white suffused with pinkish-buff. The upper side of the tail is black suffused with pinkish-buff and the underside is tawny tipped with pinkish-buff. In winter the animal's color is greyer and less tawny.

In some areas, where range overlap with the yellow-pine chipmunk occurs, it may be difficult or impossible to distinguish the two species in the field; laboratory examination of skeletal structures may be required.

== Distribution and habitat ==
The red-tailed chipmunk is native to southeastern British Columbia, southwestern Alberta, northeastern Washington, northern Idaho and western Montana. It is found at altitudes between 720 and 2,400 metres (2,360 and 7,870 ft) in coniferous forests, other woodland, forest edges, glades and bushy areas at the edge of upland meadows. It primarily lives on the ground but sometimes climb trees.

== Biology ==
The red-tailed chipmunk feeds mainly on seeds and berries and sometimes carries these in its cheek pouches. Frequently eaten foods include the seeds of fir and pine, honeysuckle berries, cranberries, whortleberries, huckleberries, the seeds of locust trees and of snow brush, buckbrush, thistle, willow herb, grasses and many others types of seed. Dandelion flowers and leaves are sometimes eaten and the animal has been caught in traps baited with meat. It does not hibernate but it may have periods of torpor.

Breeding takes place in the late spring and summer, a litter size averaging five young born after a gestation period of about 31 days. Most nests are underground in a burrow but tree nests are occasionally used, often placed immediately underneath dense growths of dead twigs. The young first emerge from the nest when aged about 45 days.
