= Pipestone Creek =

Stream in Alberta, Canada

Coordinates: 52°58′33″N 113°09′24″W

Oxbow lake, once part of Pipestone Creek

Pipestone Creek is a waterway that runs through central Alberta, Canada. For example, over 100 acres (0.40 km^{2}) of Pipestone Creek parkland is situated in Millet, Alberta, with a combination of meadows and urban forest.

It originates east of Pigeon Lake and flows east. It is crossed by Highway2, Highway 2A, Highway 13, and the Canadian Pacific Railway tracks before it empties into the Battle River east of Wetaskiwin.

Tributaries include the Bigstone Creek, Huard Lake and Coal Lake. Long Lake and Watelet Lake are developed on the course of the creek.

This creek is unrelated to Pipestone Creek and Fossil Bed near Grande Prairie, Alberta.

== See also ==
- List of rivers of Alberta
- Pipestone Creek (Saskatchewan)
- Pipestone River (disambiguation)
