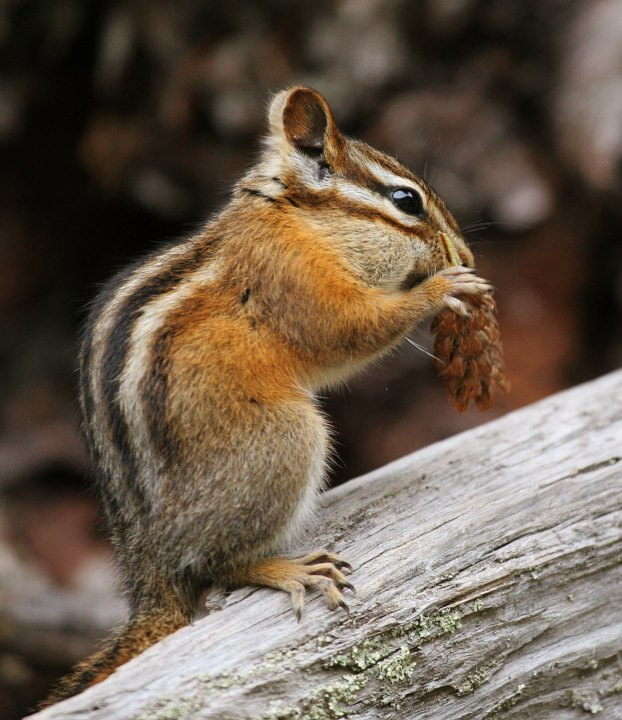

Conservation status
- Least Concern (IUCN 3.1)

Scientific classification
- Kingdom: Animalia
- Phylum: Chordata
- Class: Mammalia
- Order: Rodentia
- Family: Sciuridae
- Genus: Neotamias
- Species: N. minimus

Binomial name
- Neotamias minimus (Bachman, 1839)
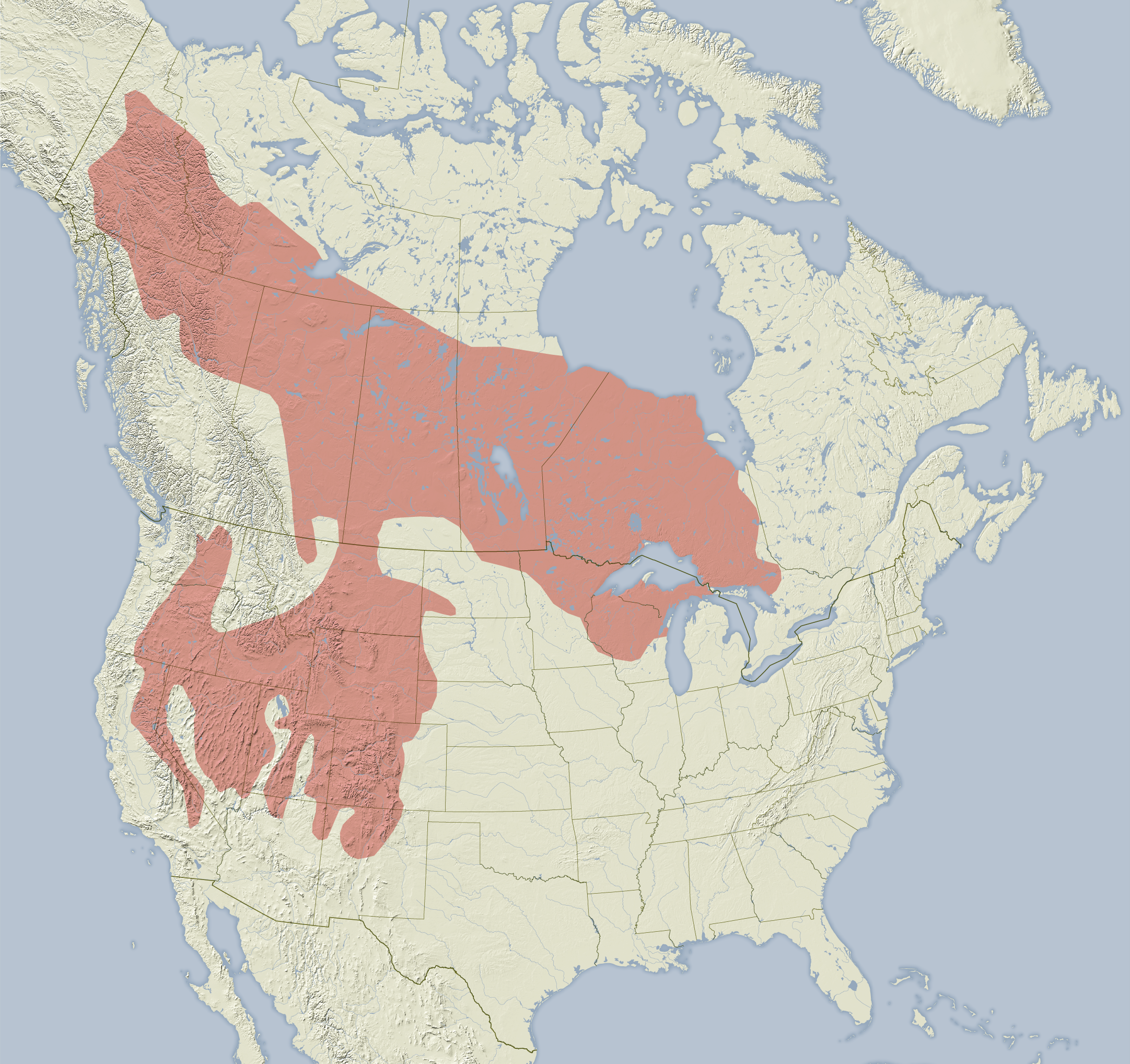
- Distribution of the least chipmunk

Synonyms
- Tamias minimus; Eutamias minimus

= Least chipmunk =

Species of rodent

The least chipmunk (Neotamias minimus) is the smallest species of chipmunk and the most widespread in North America.

== Description ==
It is the smallest species of chipmunk, measuring about 15.7–25 cm (6.2–9.8 in) in total length with a weight of 25–66 g (0.88–2.33 oz). The body is gray to reddish-brown on the sides, and grayish white on the underparts. The back is marked with five dark brown to black stripes separated by four white or cream-colored stripes, all of which run from the nape of the neck to the base of the tail. Two light and two dark stripes mark the face, running from the tip of the nose to the ears. The bushy tail is orange-brown in color, and measures 10–11 cm (3.9–4.3 in) long. In some areas, where range overlap with the yellow-pine chipmunk occurs, it may be difficult or impossible to distinguish the two species in the field; laboratory examination of skeletal structures may be required.

As in other chipmunks, there are four toes on each of the forefeet and five on the hindfeet. Females have eight teats. The brain to body mass ratio for least chipmunks is lower than that for other species of chipmunk living in the same area, suggesting that they prefer less complex environments.

== Distribution and habitat ==
Least chipmunks are found through most of the western United States from northern New Mexico and western North and South Dakota to eastern California, Oregon and Washington, and throughout much of southern and western Canada from Yukon and southeastern British Columbia to central Ontario, and into the Upper Peninsula of Michigan and neighboring parts of Wisconsin and Minnesota. Less arboreal than other chipmunks, least chipmunks are commonly found in sagebrush habitats and coniferous woodland, and along rivers, but they also occur in alpine meadows, and on the edges of the northern tundra.

== Behavior ==
Least chipmunks are diurnal and eat seeds, berries, nuts, fruits and insects. They mark areas depleted of suitable food with urine, and do not return to such patches afterwards. Home ranges vary widely, and have been reported to vary from 0.1 ha (0.25 acres) in northern Michigan to as much as 5.5 ha (14 acres) in Colorado. Because of their small size, least chipmunks are generally subordinate to yellow-pine chipmunks, which are able to drive them away from food resources where food is plentiful. However, because they need to eat less food in order to survive, least chipmunks are more numerous where resources are scarce. They are agile animals, and have been recorded running at speeds of up to 7.7 km/h (4.8 mph) in natural conditions.

Predators include hawks, owls, and mustelids.

Least chipmunks spend the winter in burrows and also scatter-hoard food in numerous concealed pits beneath logs and similar cover. Burrows consist of a single chamber about 15 cm (5.9 in) across and tunnels 7.5 cm (3.0 in) in diameter, averaging 1.7 m (5 ft 7 in) in length. They have two to four entrances, often concealed by nearby rocks, and are typically about 18 cm (7.1 in) below the surface. During the summer they may construct temporary nests in trees from leaves and grass, or appropriate hollows made by woodpeckers.

Least chipmunks do not hibernate, or put on excess fat in the fall. Instead, they survive the winter by entering torpor for long stretches of time, waking to eat food cached in the burrow. How much of each winter they spend below ground in this manner depends on the latitude, varying from late November to mid March in Michigan to mid October to late April in northern Manitoba.

== Reproduction ==
Females enter estrus within a week of emerging from their burrow in the spring, and mating typically takes place between March and May. Gestation lasts 28 to 30 days, with a single litter of three to seven young being born each year; females who lose their first litter soon after birth may, however, sometimes be able to breed again in the same year. The young are born hairless and blind, measuring about 5 cm (2.0 in) in length, and weighing 6 g (0.21 oz). They are able to stand and open their eyes at 27 days, and are weaned at 36 days. They are sexually mature at one year, but do not always breed until their second year. They can live for up to six years in captivity.

== Subspecies ==
The least chipmunk displays considerable morphological and ecological diversity over its range. Twenty subspecies are currently recognized.

- N. m. arizonensis Howell, 1922. White Mountains region, Arizona.
- N. m. atristriatus Bailey, 1913. Sacramento Mountains, New Mexico.
- N. m. borealis Allen, 1877. Extreme western Quebec to British Columbia
- N. m. cacodemus Cary, 1906. The Badlands of South Dakota south to northern Nebraska.
- N. m. caniceps Osgood, 1900. Northwestern British Columbia to the central Yukon.
- N. m. caryi Merriam, 1908. Endemic to the stabilized sand dunes and alkaline soils around Great Sand Dunes National Park in the San Luis Valley, Colorado. Pale gray with obscure dorsal stripes. Intergrades with N. m. operarius on the margin of the dune system.
- N. m. chuskaensis Sullivan and Petersen, 1988. Chuska mountains, Arizona.
- N. m. confinis Howell, 1925. Bighorn Mountains, Wyoming and Montana.
- N. m. consobrinus Allen, 1890. As far south as the Kaibab Plateau and as far north as southeastern Montana. It occurs throughout the Wasatch range in Utah as well as western Wyoming and northwestern Colorado.
- N. m. hudsonius Anderson and Rand, 1944. North of N. m. borealis from northeastern Saskatchewan to northern Ontario.
- N. m. jacksoni Howell, 1925. Southeastern Manitoba to northern Minnesota, Wisconsin and northeastern Michigan.
- N. m. minimus Bachman, 1839. Southwestern Wyoming to northwestern Colorado.
- N. m. neglectus Allen, 1890. Southeastern Quebec, southwestern Ontario, and the eastern upper peninsula, Michigan.
- N. m. operarius Merriam, 1905. The southern Rocky Mountains from southern Wyoming to northern New Mexico, as far west as eastern Utah.
- N. m. oreocetus Merriam, 1897. Northern Montana to central Alberta.
- N. m. pallidus Allen, 1874. Eastern Montana and northeastern Wyoming. Occurs as far east as central North Dakota and extreme western Nebraska.
- N. m. pictus Allen, 1890. South-central Idaho to east-central Utah.
- N. m. scrutator Hall and Hatfield, 1934. The great basin from eastern Utah across Nevada to central Oregon. Reaches as far north as southern Washington. Also occurs in the Sierra Nevada of California.
- N. m. selkirki Cowan, 1946. Central Purcell Mountains, British Columbia.
- N. m. silvaticus White, 1952. The Black Hills of western South Dakota and northeastern Wyoming.

The Peñasco least chipmunk (N. m. atristriatus) occurs only in the Sacramento mountains of New Mexico where it is threatened by habitat loss. It has been proposed for listing under the endangered species act.

The Coulee chipmunk was considered a subspecies of the least chipmunk until it was recognized as a distinct species in 2022.

== Gallery ==
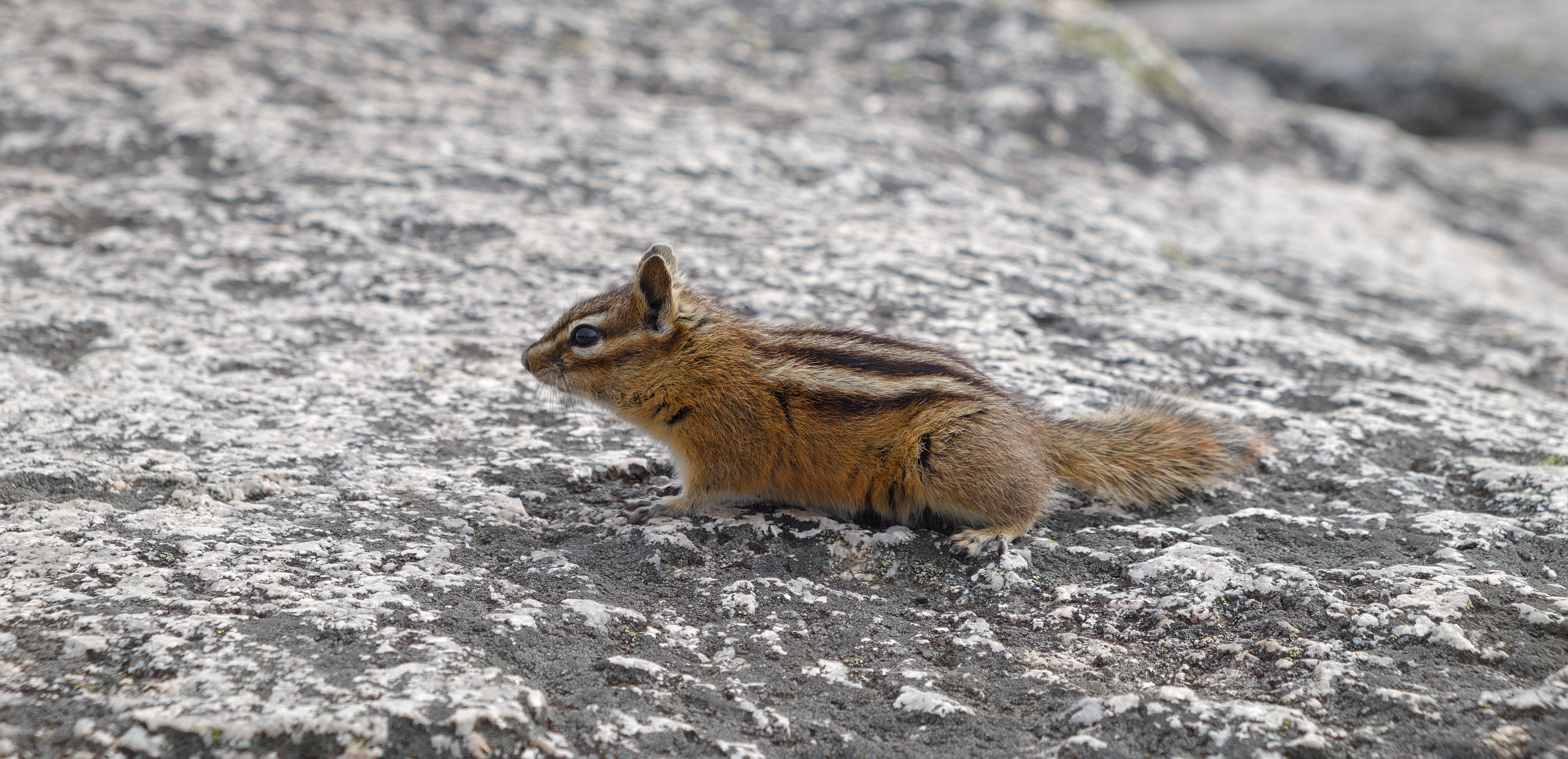
Neotamias minimus (side)

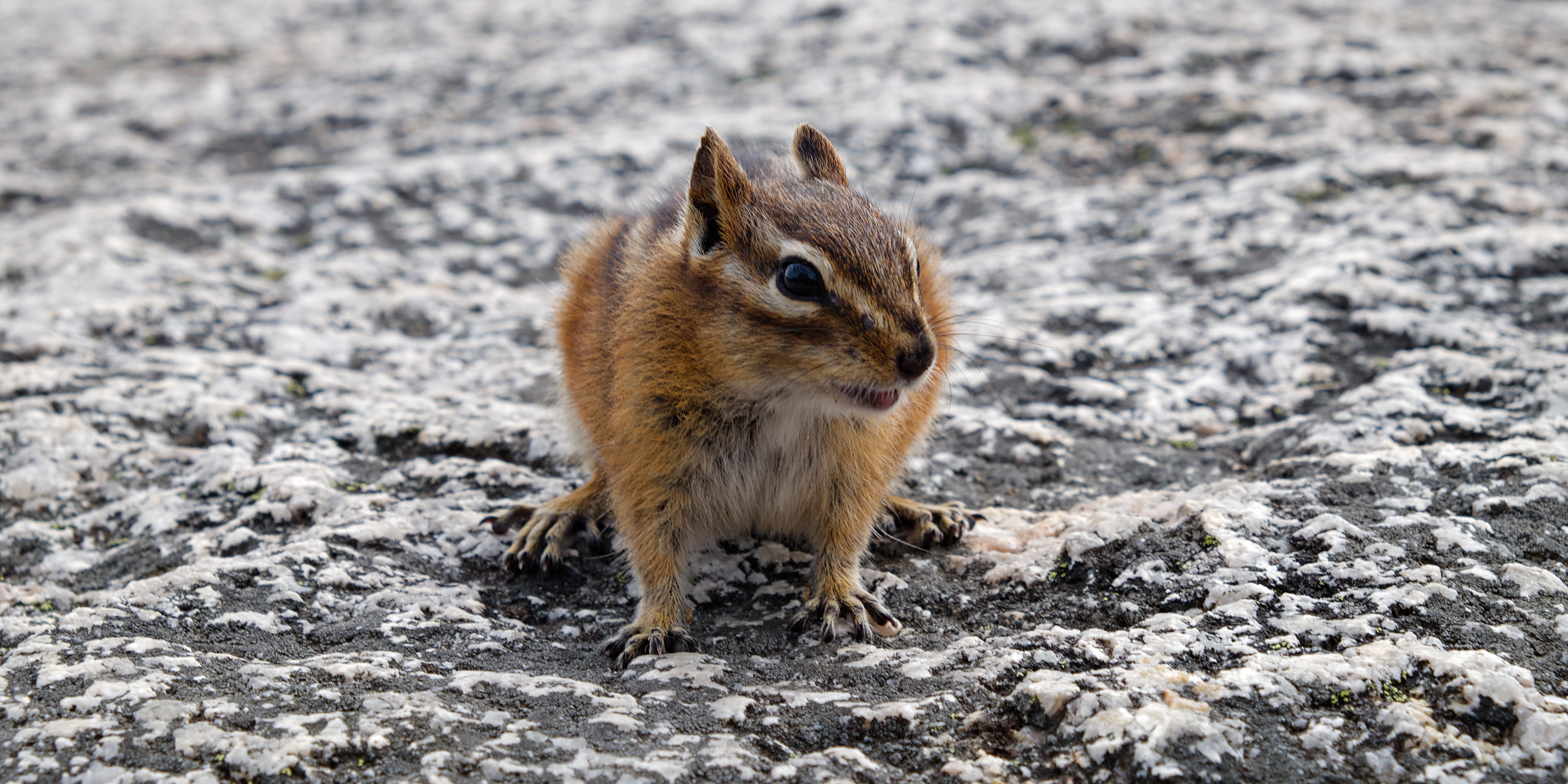
Neotamias minimus (front)

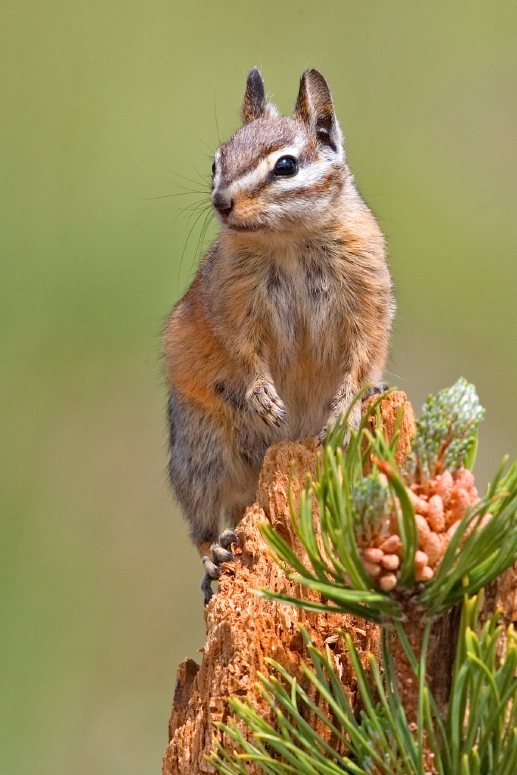
Least chipmunk
