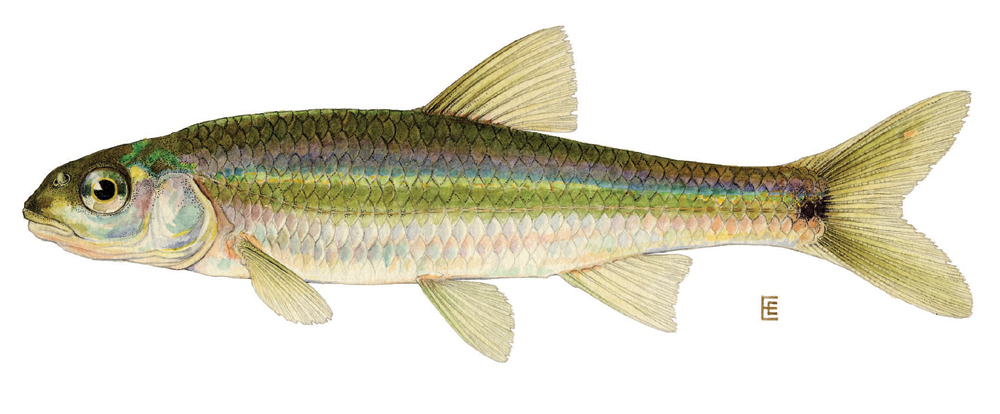

Conservation status
- Least Concern (IUCN 3.1)

Scientific classification
- Kingdom: Animalia
- Phylum: Chordata
- Class: Actinopterygii
- Division: Teleostei
- Order: Cypriniformes
- Family: Leuciscidae
- Subfamily: Pogonichthyinae
- Genus: Hudsonius
- Species: H. hudsonius

Binomial name
- Hudsonius hudsonius (Clinton, 1824)

Synonyms
- Clupea hudsonia Clinton, 1824; Notropis hudsonius (Clinton, 1824); Hudsonius amarus Girard, 1856; Hudsonius fluviatilis Girard, 1856; Hybobsis phaenna Cope, 1865; Luxilus selene D. S. Jordan, 1877; Alburnops saludanus D. S. Jordan & Brayton, 1878; Hudsonius euryopa T. H. Bean, 1880; Notropis scopiferus C. H. Eigenmann & Eigenmann, 1893; Opsopoeodus borealis Harper & Nichols, 1919

= Spottail shiner =

Species of fish

The spottail shiner or spottail minnow (Hudsonius hudsonius) is a species of freshwater ray-finned fish belonging to the family Leuciscidae, the shiners, daces and minnows. It can be found as far north as Canada and as far south as the Chattahoochee River in Georgia. These shiners live in lakes, rivers, and creeks. They occupy the rocky or sandy shorelines and bottoms of the water. One of the defining features of a spottail shiner is the black spot found at the base of the caudal fin. These shiners generally spawn from late June through July.

== Description ==
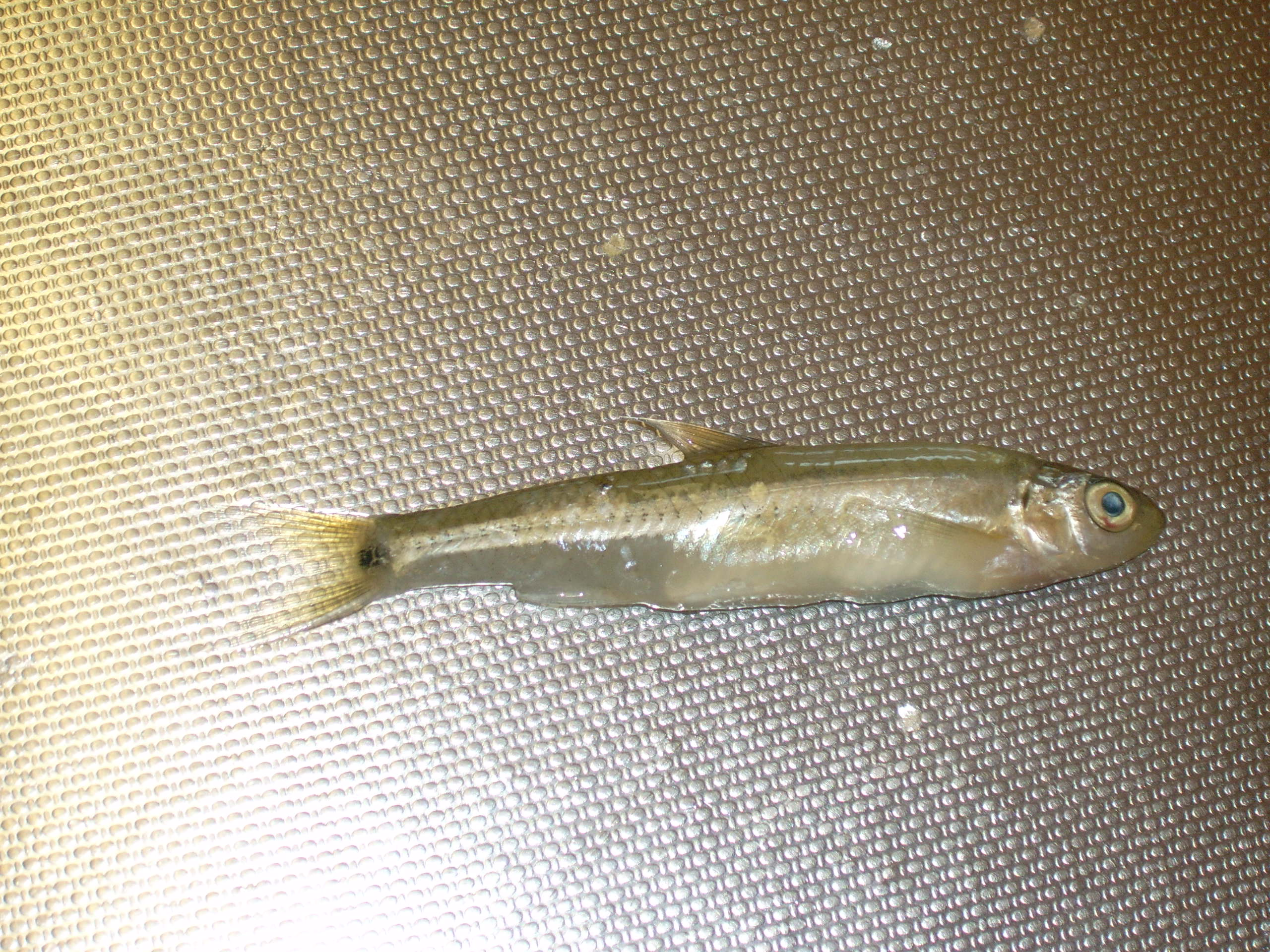
Goulais Bay, Lake Superior

Spottail shiners are typically small to medium-sized minnows. The average size ranges from around 2 to 3 inches (5.1 to 7.6 cm). They can reach up to 6 inches (15 cm) at their maximum length. They have a slightly elongate, compressed body with a horizontal, sub-terminal mouth. The defining feature of a spottail shiner is the distinct black spot at the base of the caudal fin. The lower edge of the caudal fin can be white in color with all of the other fins lacking pigment. The dorsal fin sits directly above the pelvic fins. The dorsal side of this shiner can range from a silvery to pale green or olive color, whereas the ventral side is white. The spottail shiner has a complete lateral line running horizontally along its sides.

== Geographic distribution ==
Hudsonius species mainly live in streams and rivers but can be found in larger lakes. They can be found 3 to 60 feet (0 to 20 m) deep, on substrates of sand and gravel. The spottail shiner is one of more common species of the genus Hudsonius. Spottail shiners are native to Canada and the United States. They are found in the St. Lawrence River in Quebec, Chattahoochee River and Altamaha River in Georgia, the Mackenzie River basin in Canada, northern Ohio, southern Illinois, the Hudson Bay, some lakes throughout Montana, and the Great Lakes. They can also be found in some lakes in the upper northeast region of the United States. These spottail shiners seem to have only occupied the areas of Canada and United States that they are currently distributed today, with the exception of Montana. It seems that the shiners have been introduced in lakes through Montana in order to become bait for some of the larger gaming fish such as the walleye.

== Ecology ==
Spottail shiners are generally omnivorous fish that feed on plants, aquatic invertebrate, and zoobenthos. Zoobenthos are the invertebrates that occupy the benthos of the riverbeds and lakebeds. This shiner is said to feed on green algae, plant debris, vascular plants, water fleas, caddis flies, mayflies, nematocerans, and the remains of macroinvertebrates. Given the small size of the fish it does not usually prey on other fish species. The spottail shiner obtains much of its food by scavenging on the floor of the river, lakes, and streams that it occupies.

Given the small size of spottail shiners, many different species of fish prey upon them. Some predators include rainbow trout, coho salmon, chinook salmon, northern pike, walleye, brown trout, lake trout (Salvelinus namaycush), and bluefish (Pomatomus saltatrix).

The spottail shiner mainly competes with species that have the same diet and live in the areas. These competitors can include other species of shiners, yellow perches, or white perches.

There are certain abiotic factors that determine spottail shiners' habitat. The spottail shiner's highest activity levels are usually seen in areas where the pH value range between 5.6 and 6.6, maximizing at a pH value around 6.1. Spottail shiners generally live in waters that temperatures range from 10 to 50 °C (50 to 122 °F).

== Life history ==
The life history of the spottail shiner has not been studied much. Spottail shiners breeding season usually occurs in the summertime during the months of June and July. They are thought to spawn in the sandy bottoms and shorelines of the rivers, lakes, and creeks where they live. Females are thought to produce anywhere from 100 to 2,600 eggs per spawning event. The mature age of a spottail shiner is around one or two years of age. The maximum age recorded for a spottail shiner to live is 5 years. Since there has not been a lot of research involving the life history of the spottail shiner not a lot of information can be given on spawning and reproduction.

== Conservation and management ==
Spottail shiners are currently listed as of least concern. These shiners are not vulnerable in the wild yet. The primary causes for death is being preyed upon, pollution of their natural habitat, and parasites. Minnows are used as bait for game fishing. These shiners are caught and used as bait fish throughout the area they occupy. They are one of the most popular minnow used to lure walleyes. Their shiny scales and small bodies attract specific species of game fish that anglers frequently try to catch. Currently there are conservation agencies at the state-level protecting these shiners from being harvested for fish bait. Pollution of many different toxic chemicals into the areas that these shiners live is one of the main causes of death. It is found that water pollution from wastewater and runoff affect the immune system of spottail shiners. There are certain parasites that also affect the life of these shiners. The parasites are also found to affect the immune system in spottail shiners.
