= San Augustin Mountains =

Mountain subrange of the San Andres Mountains

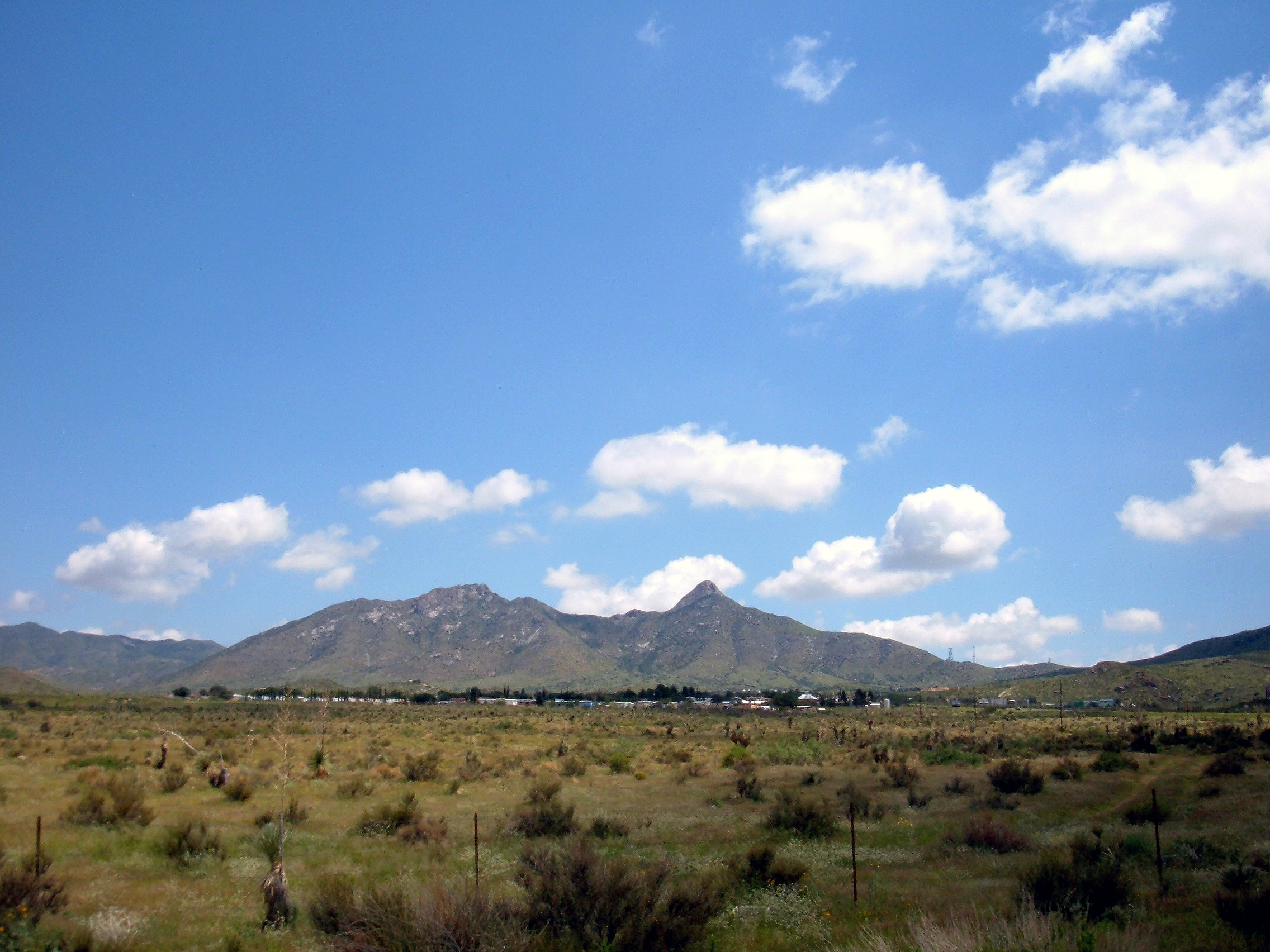
- View looking east-northeast, south section of mountains, San Augustin Peak on right

Highest point
- Peak: Bear Peak (New Mexico), San Augustin Mountains
- Elevation: 7,087 ft (2,160 m)
- Coordinates: 32°30′44″N 106°32′19″W

Dimensions
- Length: 8 mi (13 km) SW-NE
- Width: 6 mi (9.7 km)

Geography
- Location within New Mexico
- Country: United States
- State: New Mexico
- Region: (northwest)-Chihuahuan Desert
- County: Doña Ana County, NM
- Peaks: San Augustin Peak
- Settlement: Organ, NM–White Sands, NM
- Range coordinates: 32°26′19″N 106°33′46″W
- Borders on: San Andres Mountains-N; San Augustin Pass-S; Organ Mountains-S; Organ, NM & Las Cruces, NM-W; White Sands-NE, E & SE

The San Augustin Mountains are a small mountain subrange located at the southern terminus of the San Andres Mountains east of Las Cruces, New Mexico.

== Description ==
The San Augustin Mountains are only about an 8 miles (13 km) long range, trending slightly northeast. The southern border is San Augustin Pass, where U.S. Route 70 goes from Las Cruces and Organ and turns northeast through White Sands to meet Alamogordo.

The north of the range is delimited by Bear Canyon, an east-west canyon with its outlet to the northeast. Also north is the San Andres National Wildlife Refuge which takes up about a 30 mi stretch of the San Andres Mountains ridgeline.

The high Black Mountain section is on the southeast of Bear Canyon and is separated northeast from the ridgeline of the San Augustins.

== Communities ==
Organ lies at the southwest foothills; the townsite, White Sands, NM lies to the southeast. The mountains are southwest of the Tularosa Valley.

=== Peaks ===
The ridgeline of the San Augustin Mountains has the range's highpoint, Bear Peak, 7,087 feet (2,160 m) at the north, and the south is terminated by San Augustin Peak, at 7,030 feet (2,143 m). Black Mountain at 7,008 feet (2,136 m), is in the northeast, and an outlier peak at the northwest is Quartzite Mountain, at 6,763 feet (2,061 m). Another outlier mountain is on the southeast, Mineral Hill at 6,154 feet (1,876 m). The highpoint, Bear Peak is located at 32.512311°N 106.538608°W.

== See also ==
- San Andres Mountains
- San Andres National Wildlife Refuge
