= List of mammals of Yellowstone National Park =

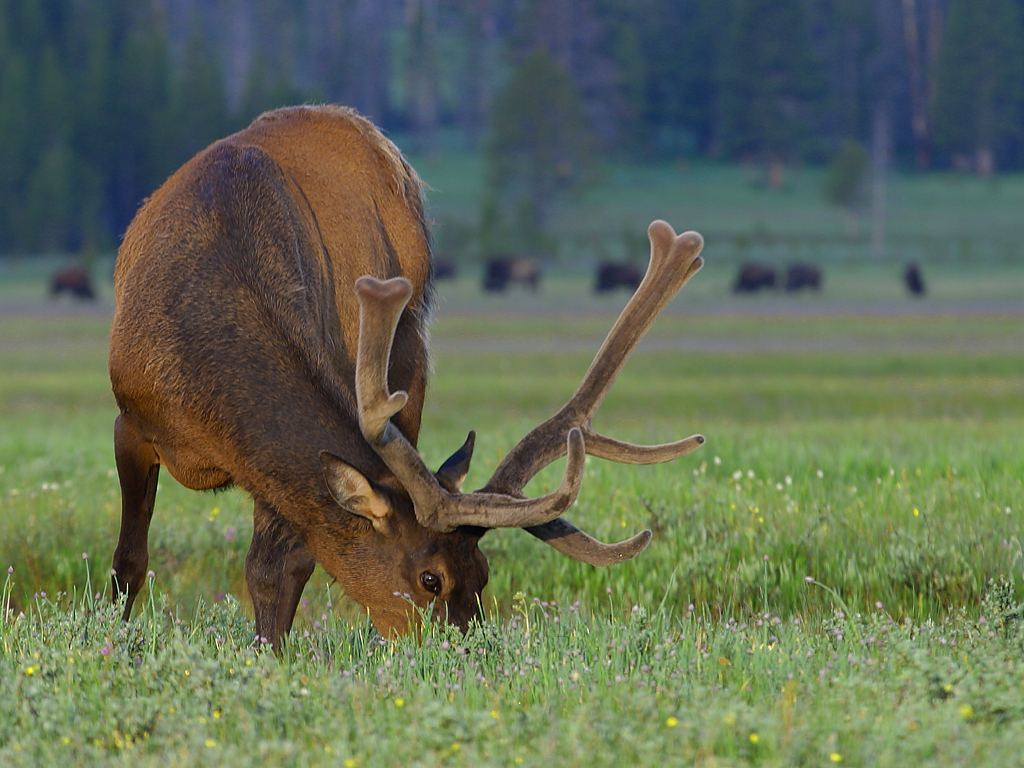
A bull elk grazes in Gibbon Meadows in the west-central portion of the park.

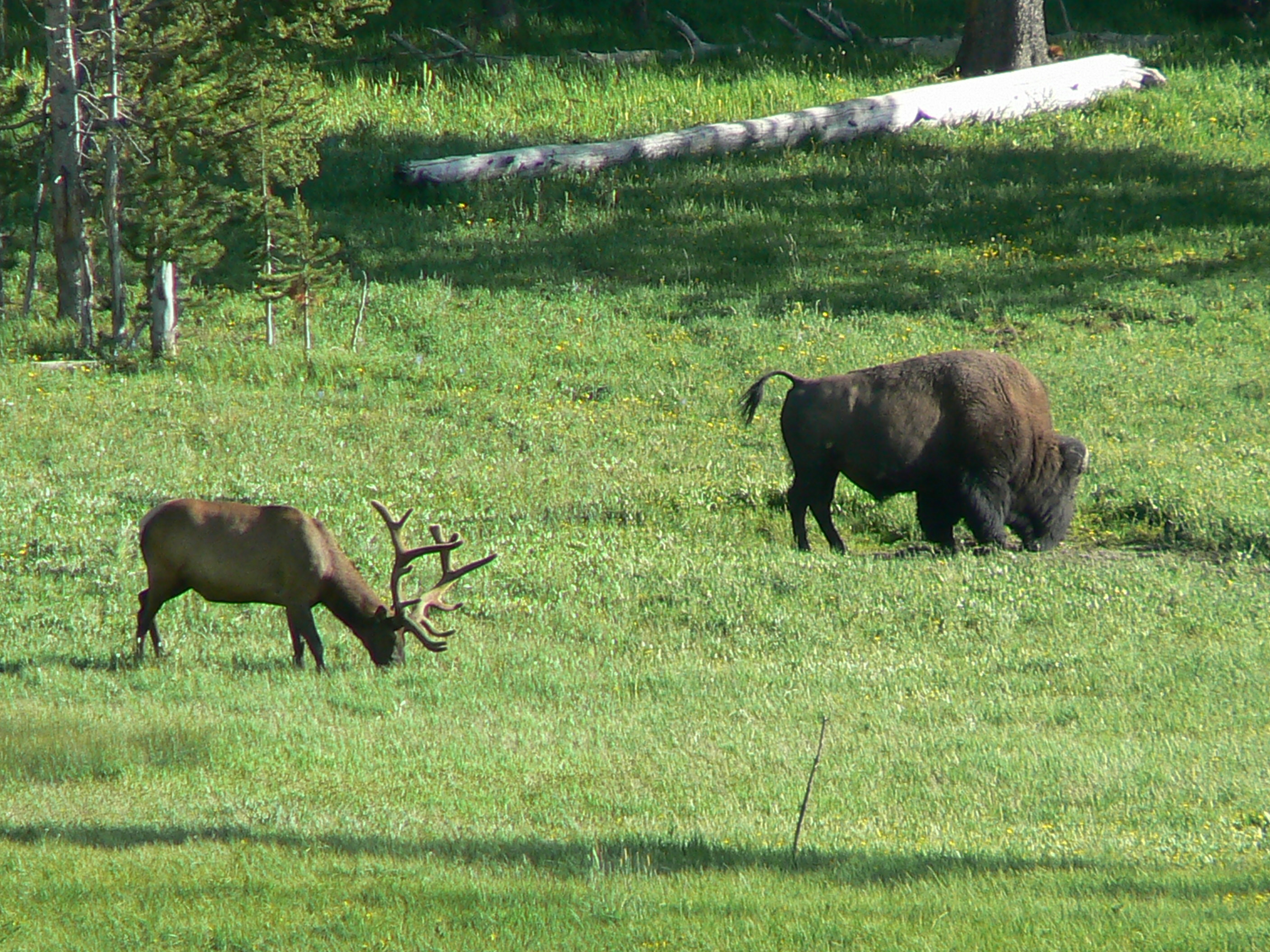
An elk grazes with a bison in the park.

There are at least 67 species of mammals known to live within Yellowstone National Park, a 2,219,791 acres (898,318 ha) protected area in the Rocky Mountains of Wyoming, Montana, and Idaho. Species are listed by common name, scientific name, typical habitat, and relative abundance.

== Canids ==
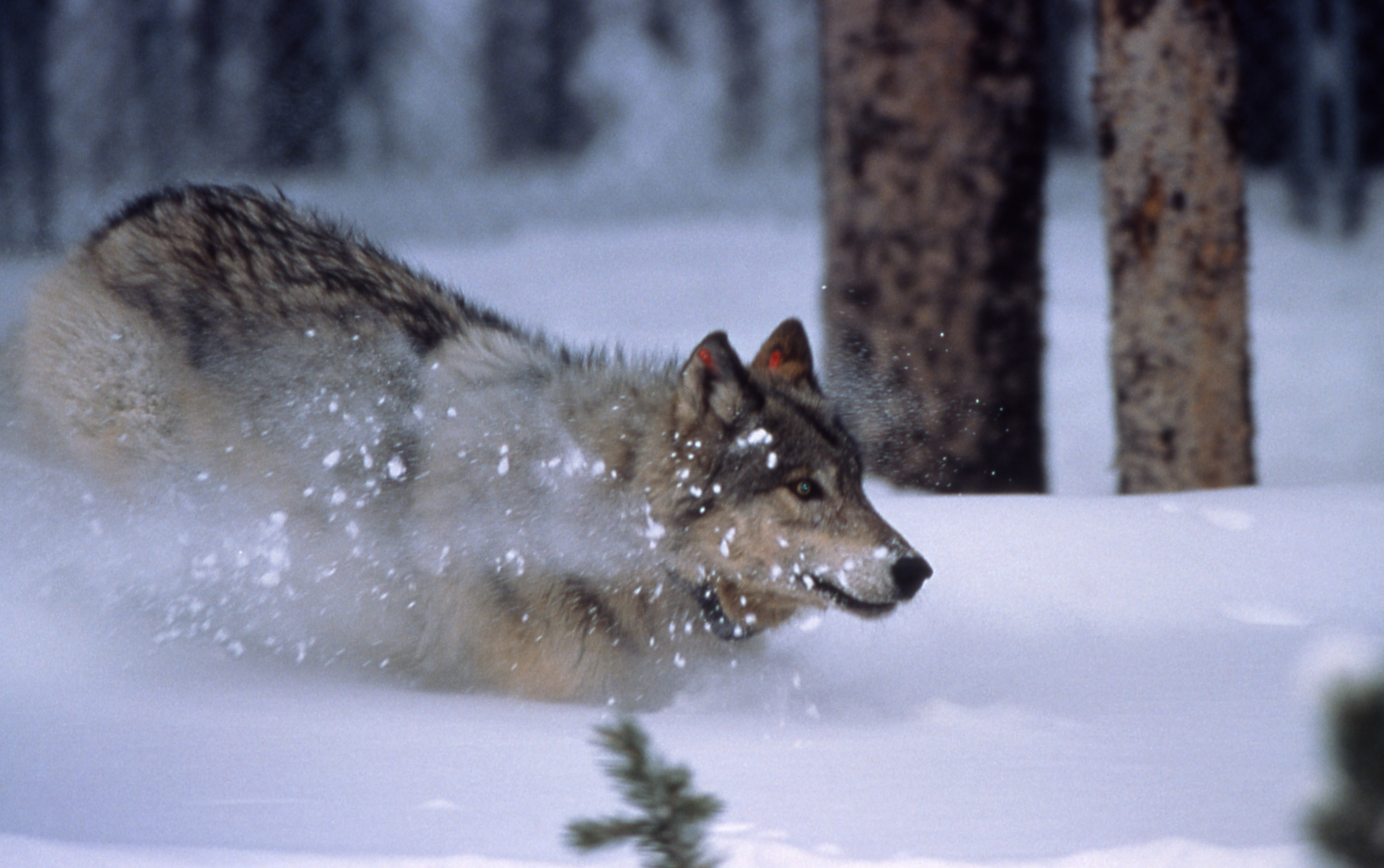
A gray wolf runs through deep snow.

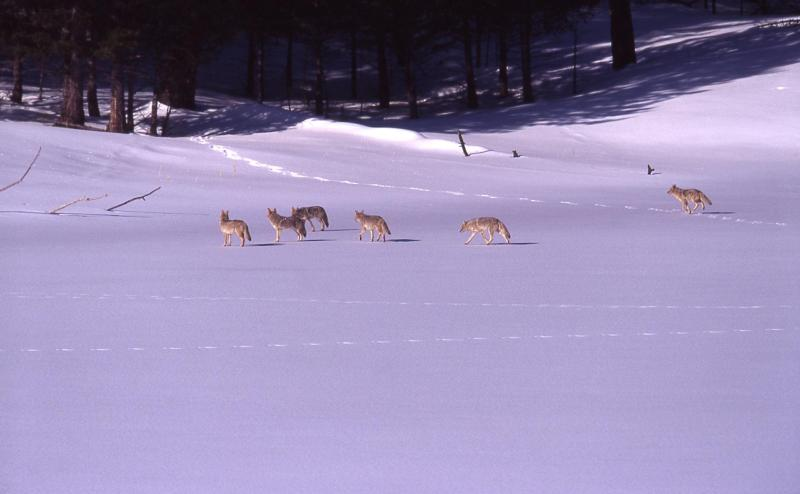
A coyote pack hunting in the snow.

Order: Carnivora Family: Canidae

- Mountain coyote (Canis latrans lestes) valleys, grasslands, forests – common
- Northwestern wolf (Canis lupus occidentalis) valleys, grasslands, forests – common
- Wasatch mountain fox (Vulpes vulpes macroura) meadows, forests – common

== Bears ==
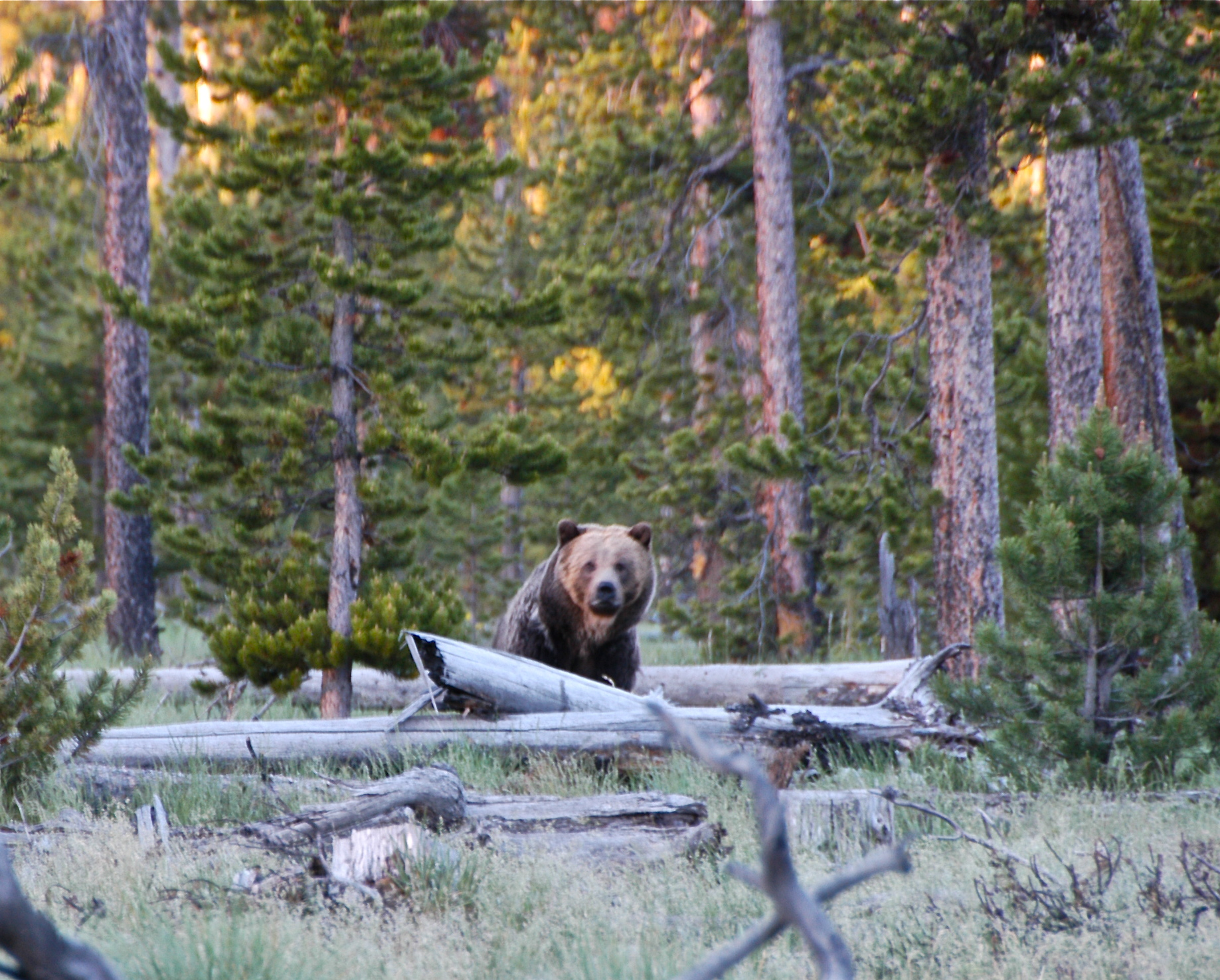
A grizzly bear

Order: Carnivora Family: Ursidae

- Grizzly bear (Ursus arctos horribilis) grasslands, forests, alpine tundra – common
- American black bear (Ursus americanus cinnamomum) forests – common

== Raccoons ==
Order: Carnivora Family: Procyonidae

- Common raccoon (Procyon lotor) rivers, cottonwoods – rare

== Felids ==
Order: Carnivora Family: Felidae

- Cougar (Puma concolor) forests, rock outcrops – uncommon
- Canada lynx (Lynx canadensis) coniferous forests – rare
- Bobcat (Lynx rufus) coniferous forests, rock outcroppings – common

== Weasels ==
Order: Carnivora Family: Mustelidae

- Wolverine (Gulo gulo) alpine tundra, coniferous forests – rare
- North American river otter (Lontra canadensis) rivers – common
- Pacific marten (Martes caurina) coniferous forests – common
- American ermine or short-tailed weasel (Mustela richardsonii) willows, spruce forests – common
- Long-tailed weasel (Neogale frenata) forests, meadows, wetlands – common
- American mink (Neogale vison) streams, rivers – uncommon
- Fisher (Pekania pennanti) forests – rare
- American badger (Taxidea taxus) grasslands, sagebrush – common

== Skunks ==
Order: Carnivora Family: Mephitidae

- Striped skunk (Mephitis mephitis) riparian forests – rare

== Rabbits and hares ==
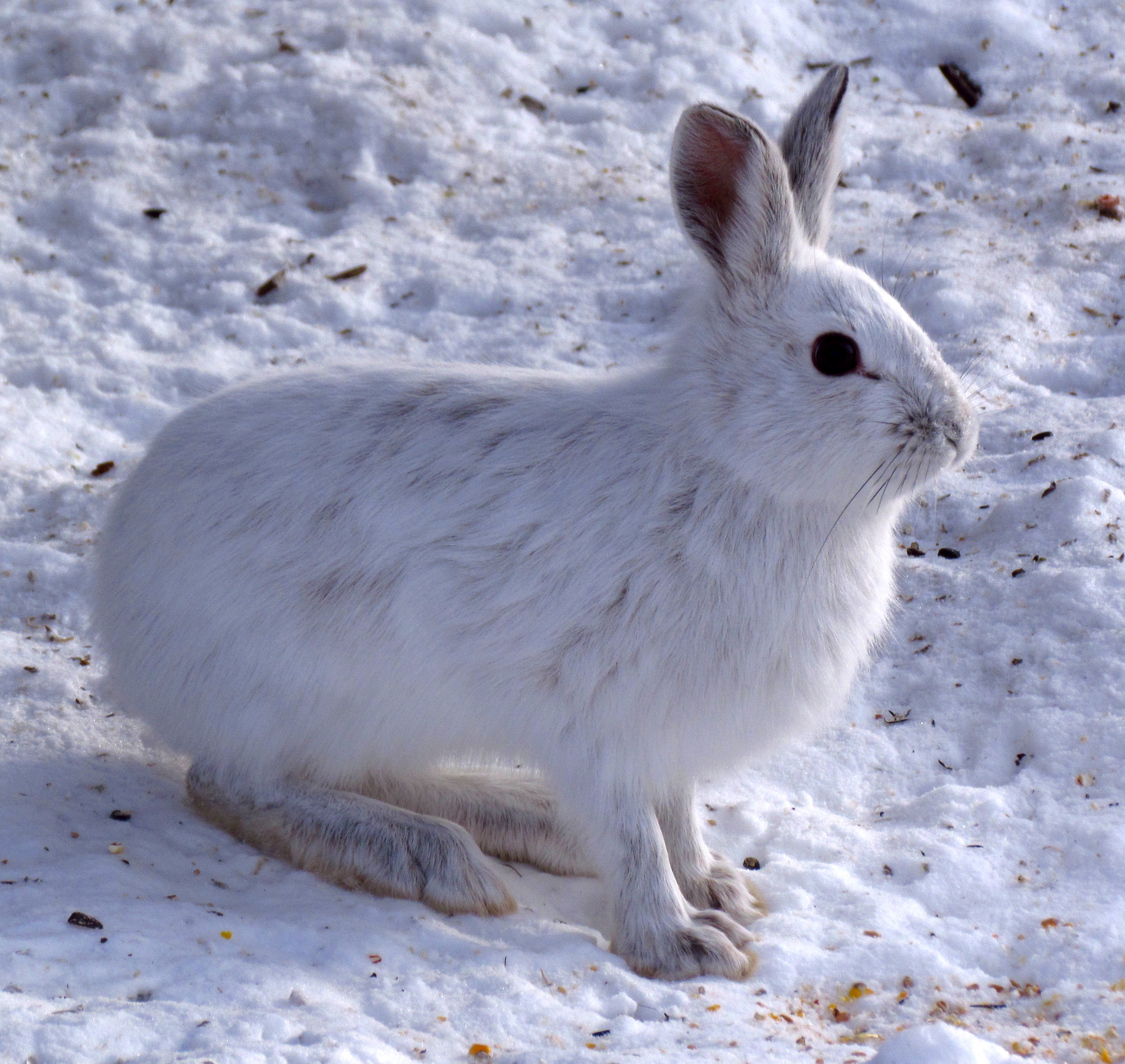
A snowshoe hare

Order: Lagomorpha Family: Leporidae

- Mountain cottontail (Sylvilagus nuttallii) shrublands – common
- Desert cottontail (Sylvilagus audubonii) shrublands – common
- Snowshoe hare (Lepus americanus) coniferous forests, willows – common
- White-tailed jackrabbit (Lepus townsendii) sagebrush, grasslands – common

== Pikas ==
Order: Lagomorpha Family: Ochotonidae

- American Pika (Ochotona princeps) alpine tundra, rocky areas – common

== Bovids ==
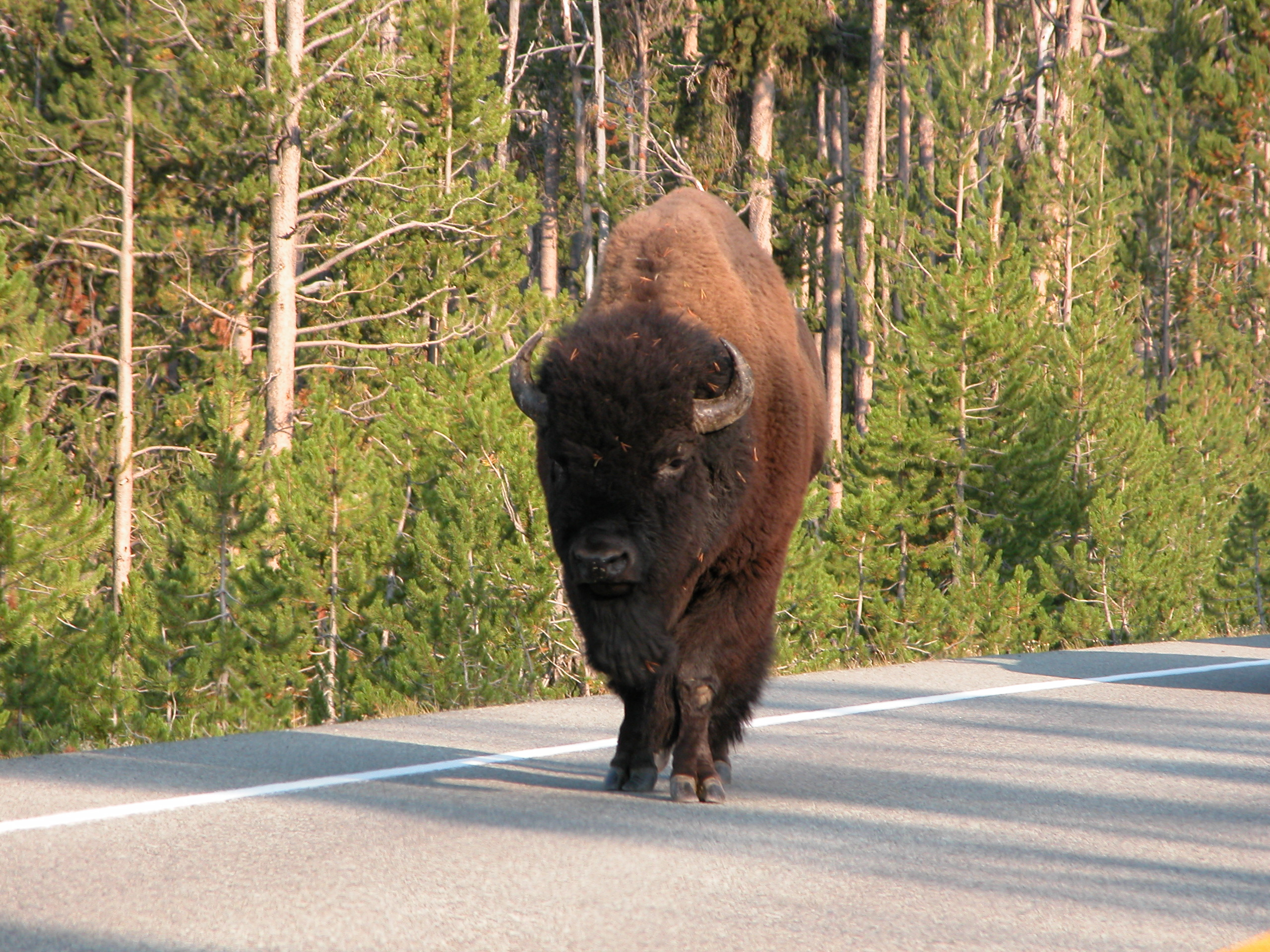
Yellowstone is home to approximately 5,000 bison.

Order: Artiodactyla Family: Bovidae

- Plains bison (Bison bison bison) grasslands, sagebrush, shrubland – abundant
- Rocky Mountain bighorn sheep (Ovis canadensis canadensis) cliffs, rock outcroppings, alpine tundra – uncommon
- Mountain Goat (Oreamnos americanus) cliffs, rock outcroppings, alpine tundra – uncommon (non-native)

== Pronghorn ==
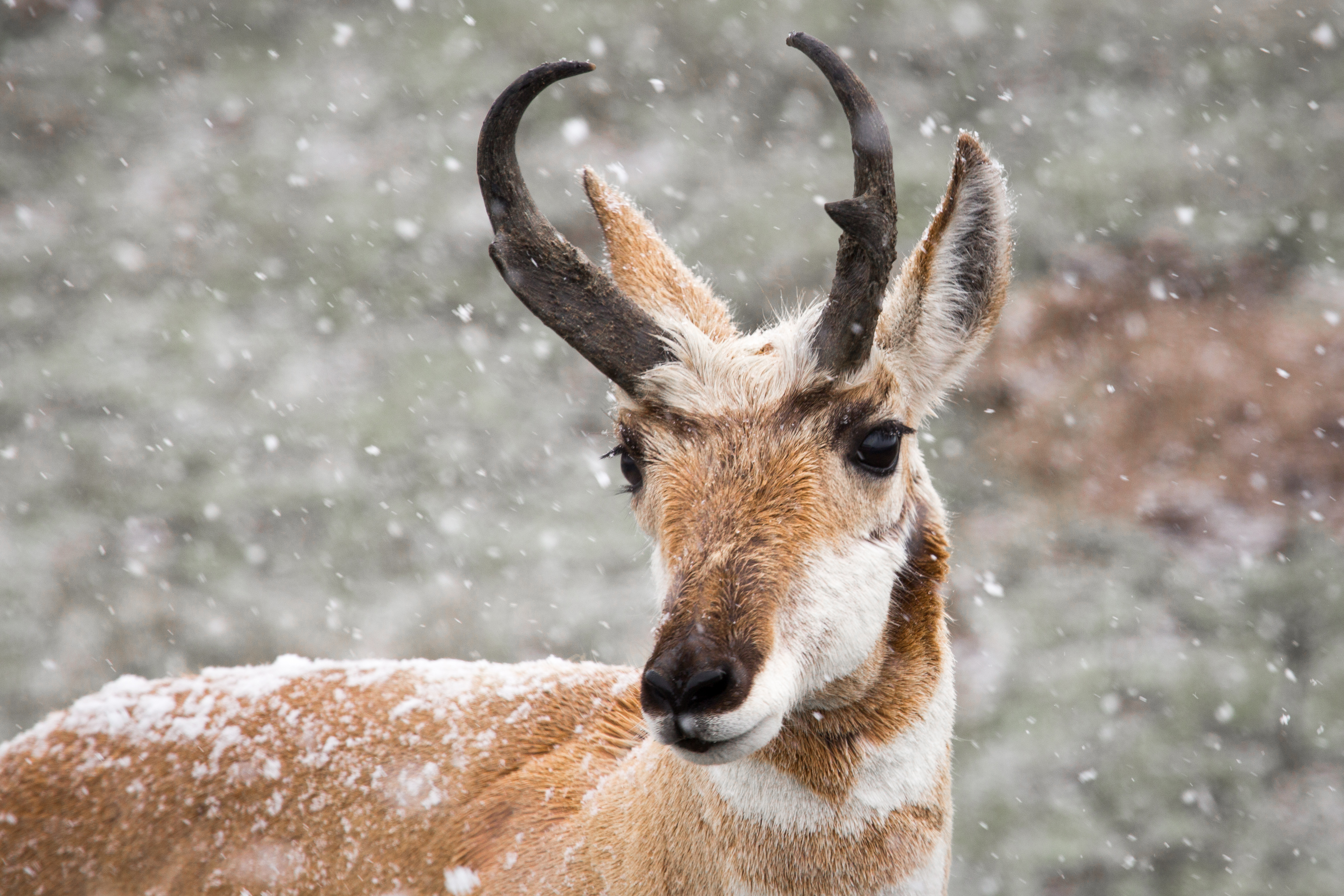
Pronghorn buck in snow.

Order: Artiodactyla Family: Antilocapridae

- Pronghorn (Antilocapra americana) sagebrush, grassland – common

== Elk, moose, and deer ==
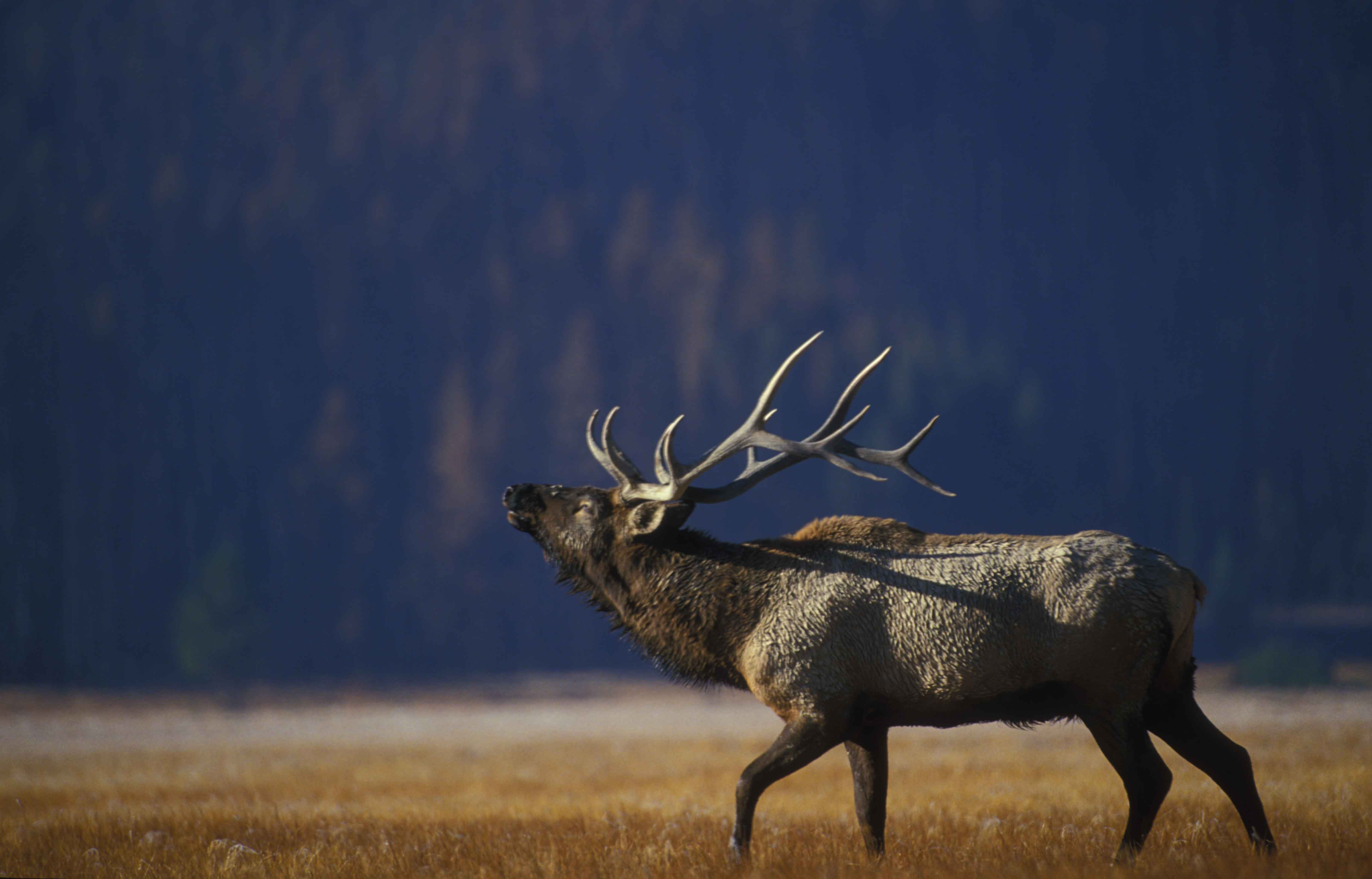
Elk are Yellowstone's most abundant large mammal.

Order: Artiodactyla Family: Cervidae

- Northwestern white-tailed deer (Odocoileus virginianus ochrourus) grasslands, forests – uncommon
- Rocky Mountain mule deer (Odocoileus hemionus hemionus) grasslands, shrubland, forests – common
- Rocky Mountain elk (Cervus canadensis nelsoni) grasslands, shrubland, forest, alpine tundra – abundant
- Shiras moose (Alces alces shirasi) grasslands, forests, river, lakes – uncommon

== Shrews ==
Order: Soricomorpha Family: Soricidae

- Dusky shrew (Sorex monticolus) meadows, forests – common
- Masked shrew (Sorex cinereous) meadows, forests – common
- American water shrew (Sorex palustris) meadows, riparian areas – common
- Preble's shrew (Sorex preblei) meadows, forests – rare, if present
- Dwarf shrew (Sorex nanus) meadows, forests – common.

== Beavers ==
Order: Rodentia Family: Castoridae

- American beaver (Castor canadensis) riparian areas – fairly common, increasing

== Squirrels ==
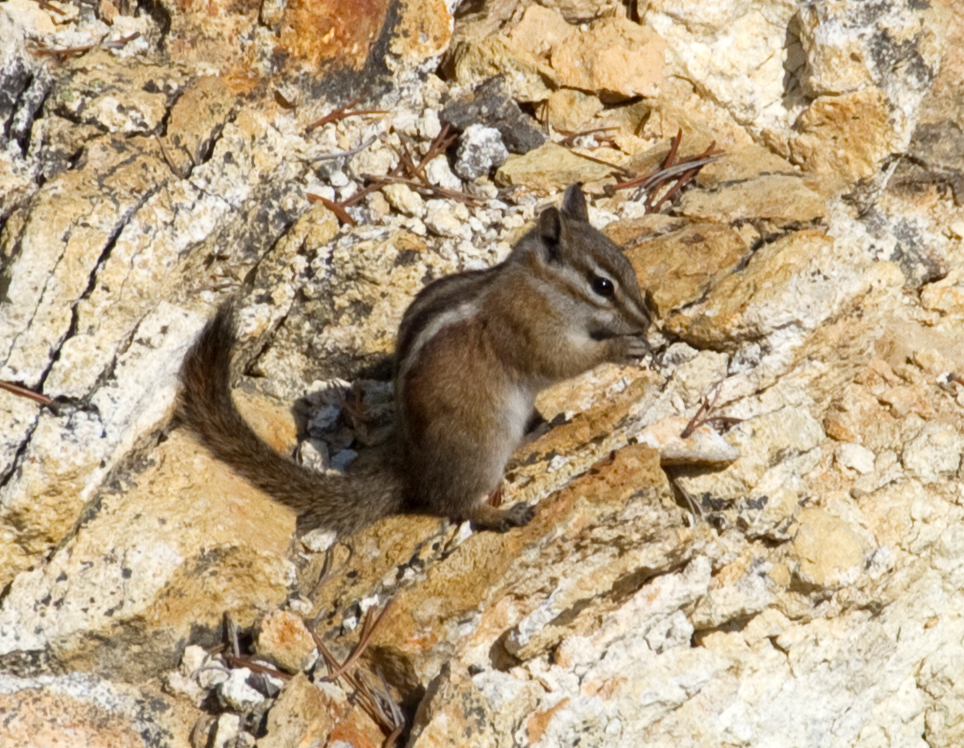
A chipmunk

Order: Rodentia Family: Sciuridae

- Least chipmunk (Neotamias minimus) meadows, forests – common
- Uinta chipmunk (Neotamias umbrinus) meadows, forests – common
- Yellow-pine chipmunk (Neotamias amoenus) meadows, forests – common
- Yellow-bellied marmot (Marmota flaventris) forests, meadows, rocky areas – common
- Northern flying squirrel (Glaucomys sabrinus) forests – occasional
- Uinta ground squirrel (Urocitellus armatus) meadows, sagebrush – common
- Golden-mantled ground squirrel (Callospermophilus lateralis) meadows, forests, rocky areas, alpine tundra – common
- American red squirrel (Tamiasciurus hudsonicus) coniferous forests – common
- Black-tailed prairie dog (Cynomys ludovicianus) grassland, shrublands – uncommon

== Voles and Woodrats ==
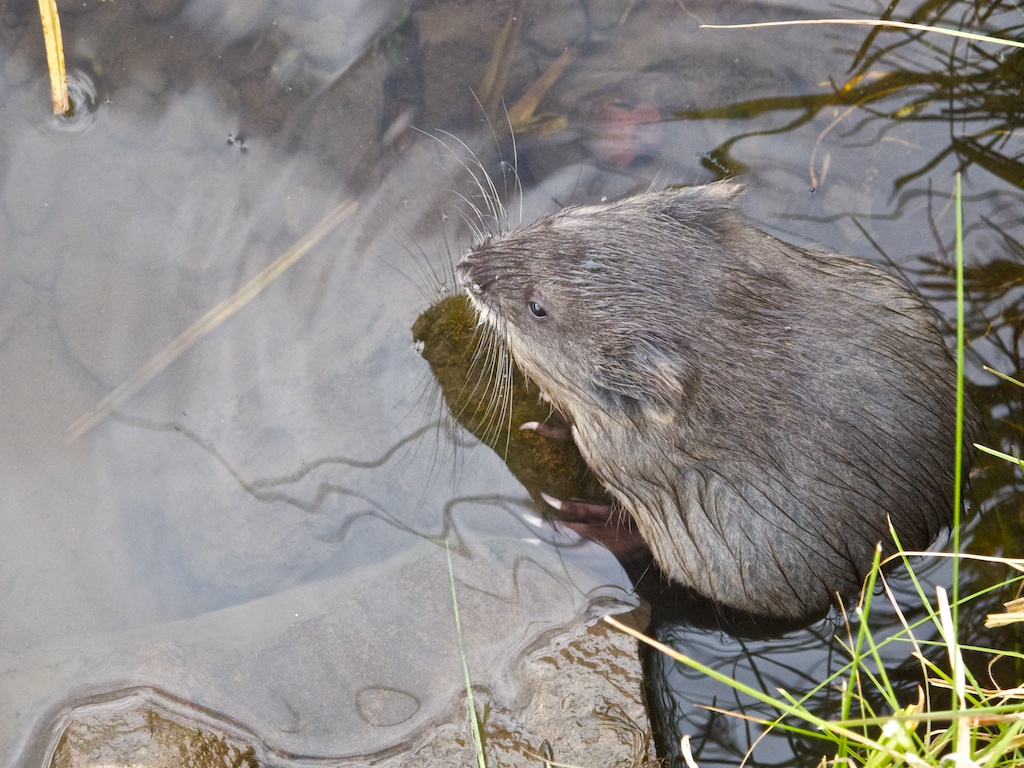
A muskrat

Order: Rodentia Family: Cricetidae

- Common muskrat (Ondatra zibethicus) riparian – occasional
- Western heather vole (Phenacomys intermedius) sagebrush, grasslands, forest – occasional
- Water vole (Microtus richardsoni) riparian – occasional
- Long-tailed vole (Microtus longicaudus) meadows – common
- Southern red-backed vole (Myodes gapperi) coniferous forests – common
- Meadow vole (Microtus pennsylvanicus) meadows – common
- Montane vole (Microtus montanus) meadows, sagebrush, riparian – common
- Bushy-tailed woodrat (Neotoma cinerea) rocky areas – common

== Mice ==
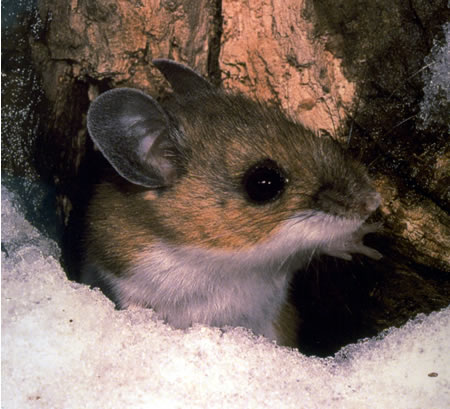
A deer mouse

Order: Rodentia Family: Cricetidae

- Deer mouse (Peromyscus maniculatus) grasslands – common

== Jumping mice ==
Order: Rodentia Family: Dipodidae

- Western jumping mouse (Zapus princeps) riparian – occasional

== Porcupines ==
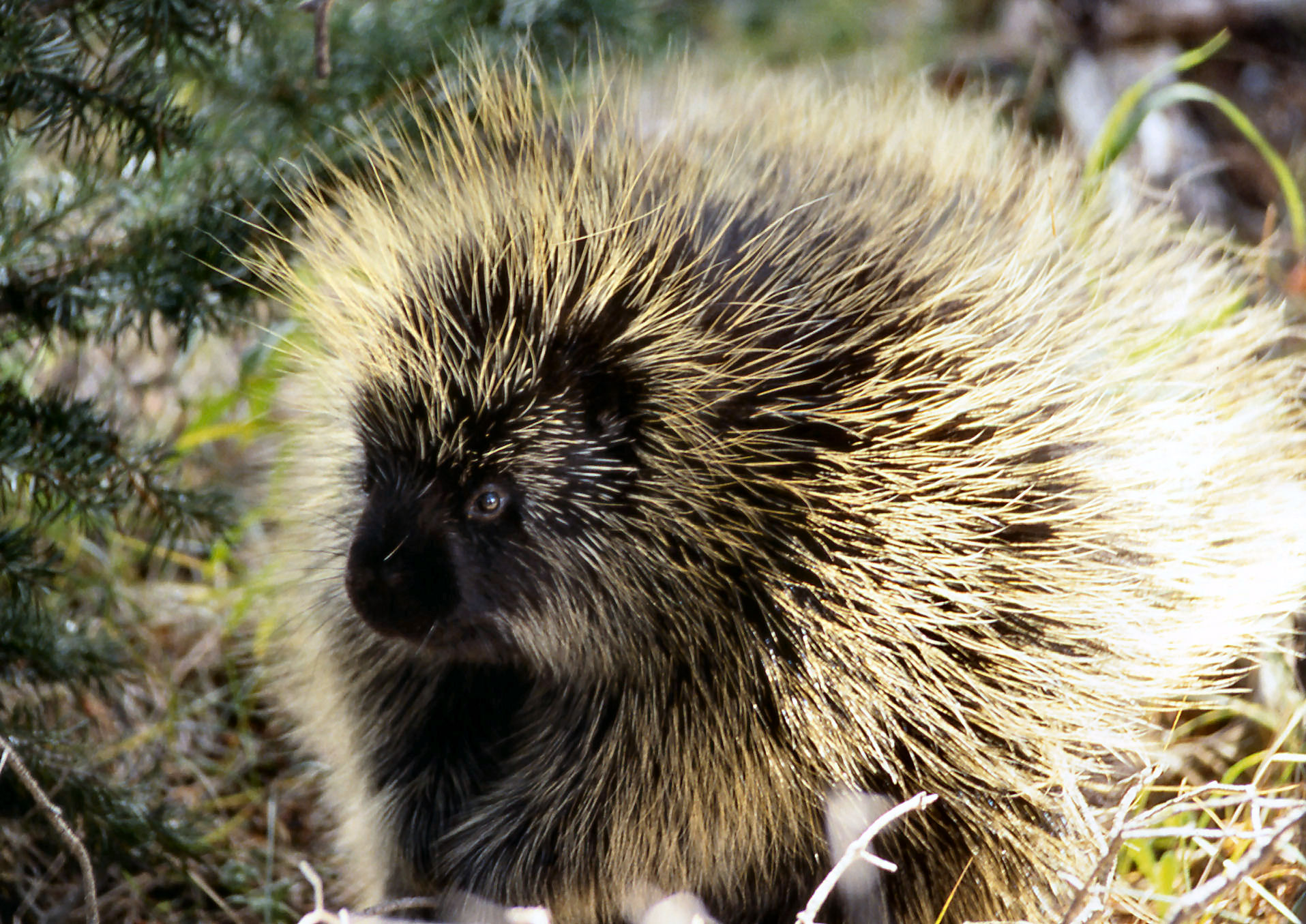
A porcupine

Order: Rodentia Family: Erethizontidae

- North American porcupine (Erethizon dorsatum) forests, sagebrush, riparian – common

== Bats ==
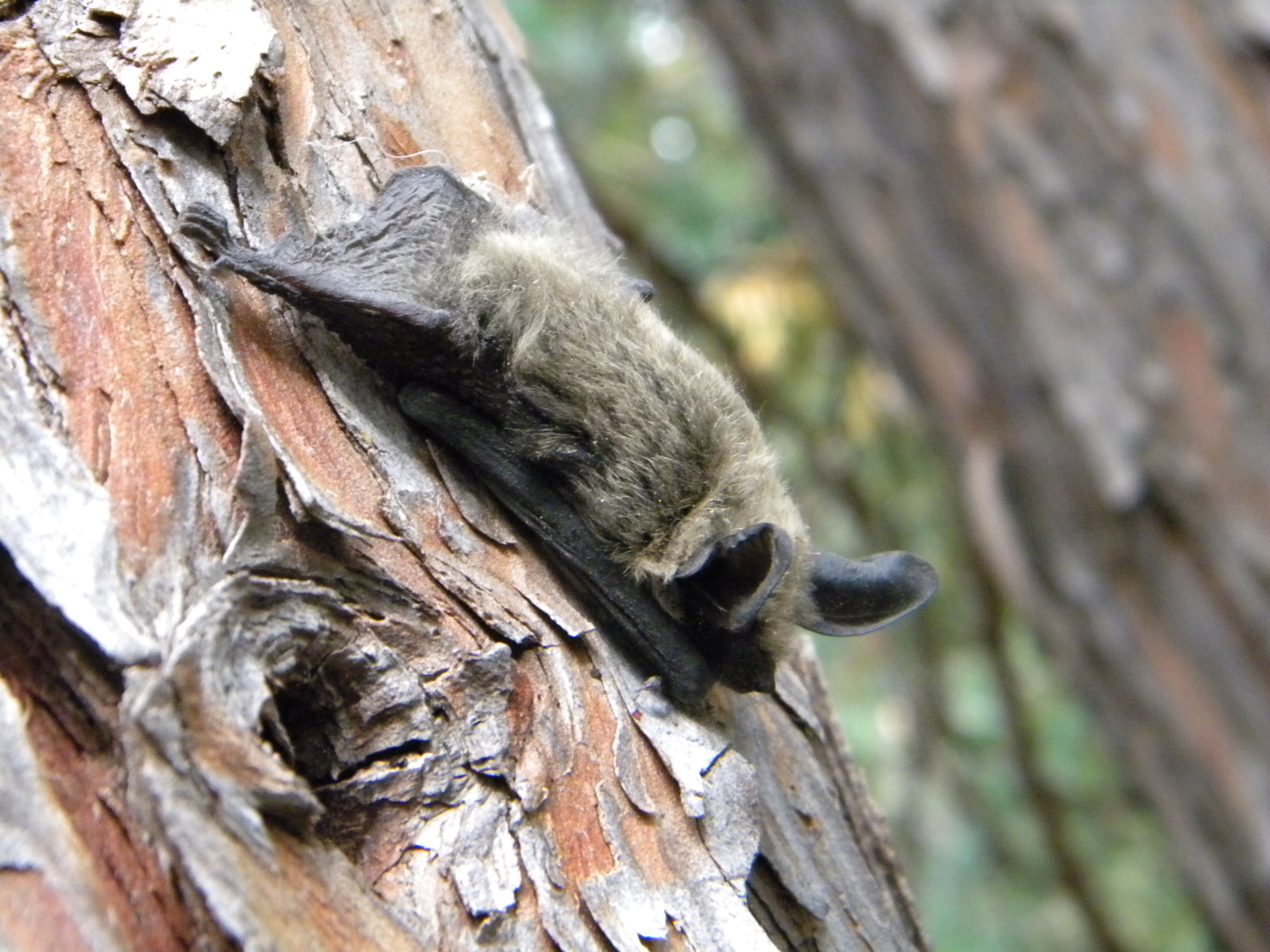
A silver-haired bat clings to a tree trunk.

Order: Chiroptera Family: Vespertilionidae

- Little brown bat (Myotis lucifugus) roosts in caves, trees, buildings – common
- Big brown bat (Eptesicus fuscus) roosts in sheltered areas – common
- Long-eared myotis (Myotis evotis) roosts on cliffs, buildings – uncommon
- Long-legged myotis (Myotis volans) roosts in cliffs, tree cavities, buildings – common
- Townsend's big-eared bat (Coryhinus townsendii) roosts in caves – uncommon
- Fringe-tailed bat (Myotis thysanodes) roosts in cliffs, snags – uncommon
- Hoary bat (Lasiurus cinereus) roosts in trees – uncommon
- Silver-haired bat (Lasionycteris noctivagans) roosts in trees, snags – common
- Spotted bat (Euderma maculatum) roosts on cliffs, trees – uncommon
- Pallid bat (Antrozous pallidus) roosts on cliffs, caves, buildings – uncommon
- California myotis (Myotis californicus) roosts in trees, rock crevices, and buildings
- Western small-footed myotis (Myotis ciliolabrum) roosts in caves, rocky areas – rare
- Yuma myotis (Myotis yumanensis) roosts in caves, buildings, trees – rare

== See also ==
- Small mammals of Yellowstone National Park
- Animals of Yellowstone
