= Small mammals of Yellowstone National Park =

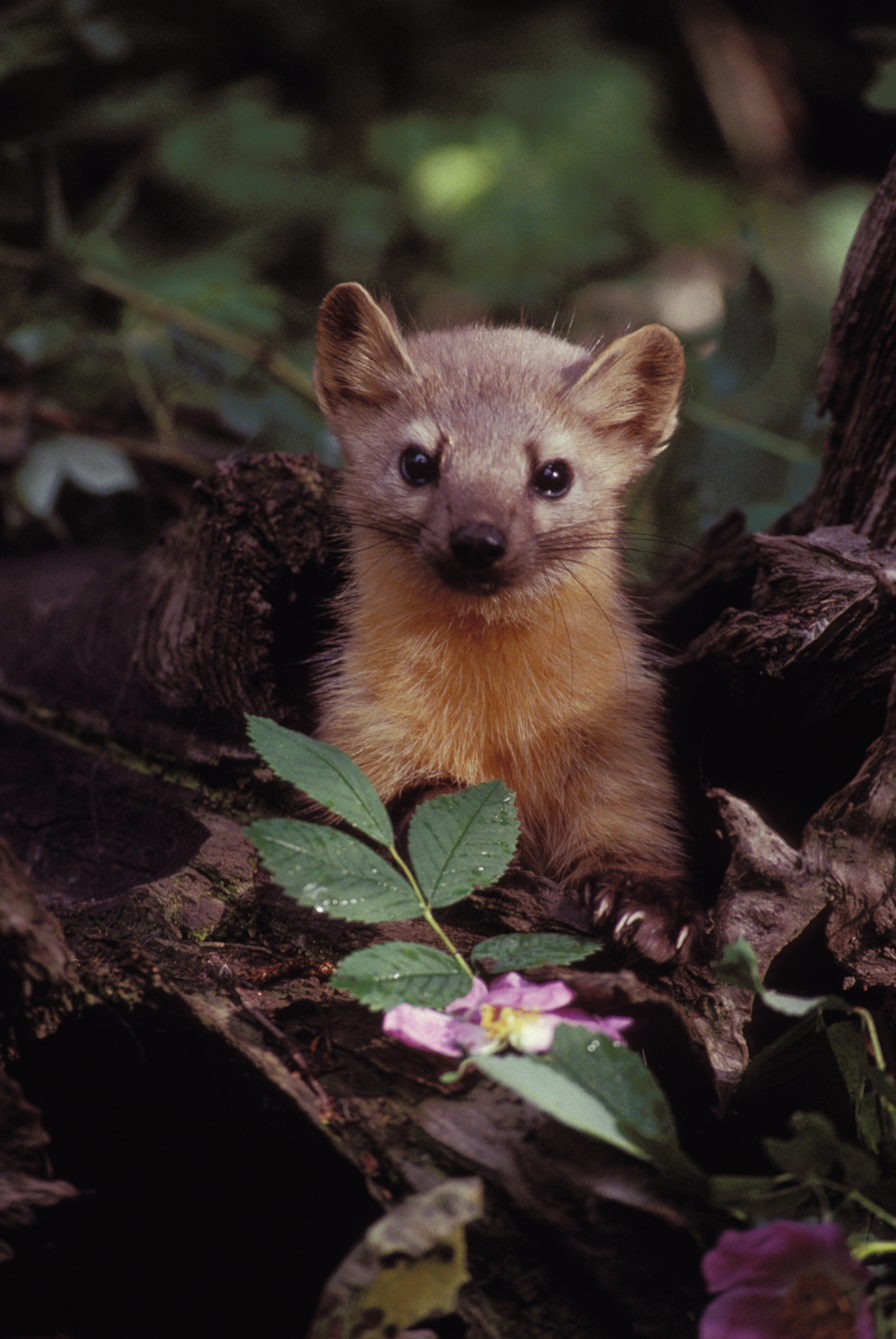
Pacific marten

There are at least 50 small mammal species known to occur in Yellowstone National Park.

Species are listed by common name, scientific name, typical habitat and relative abundance.

== Raccoons ==
Order: Carnivora Family: Procyonidae

- Raccoon, Procyon lotor, rivers, cottonwoods, rare

== Badgers and weasels ==
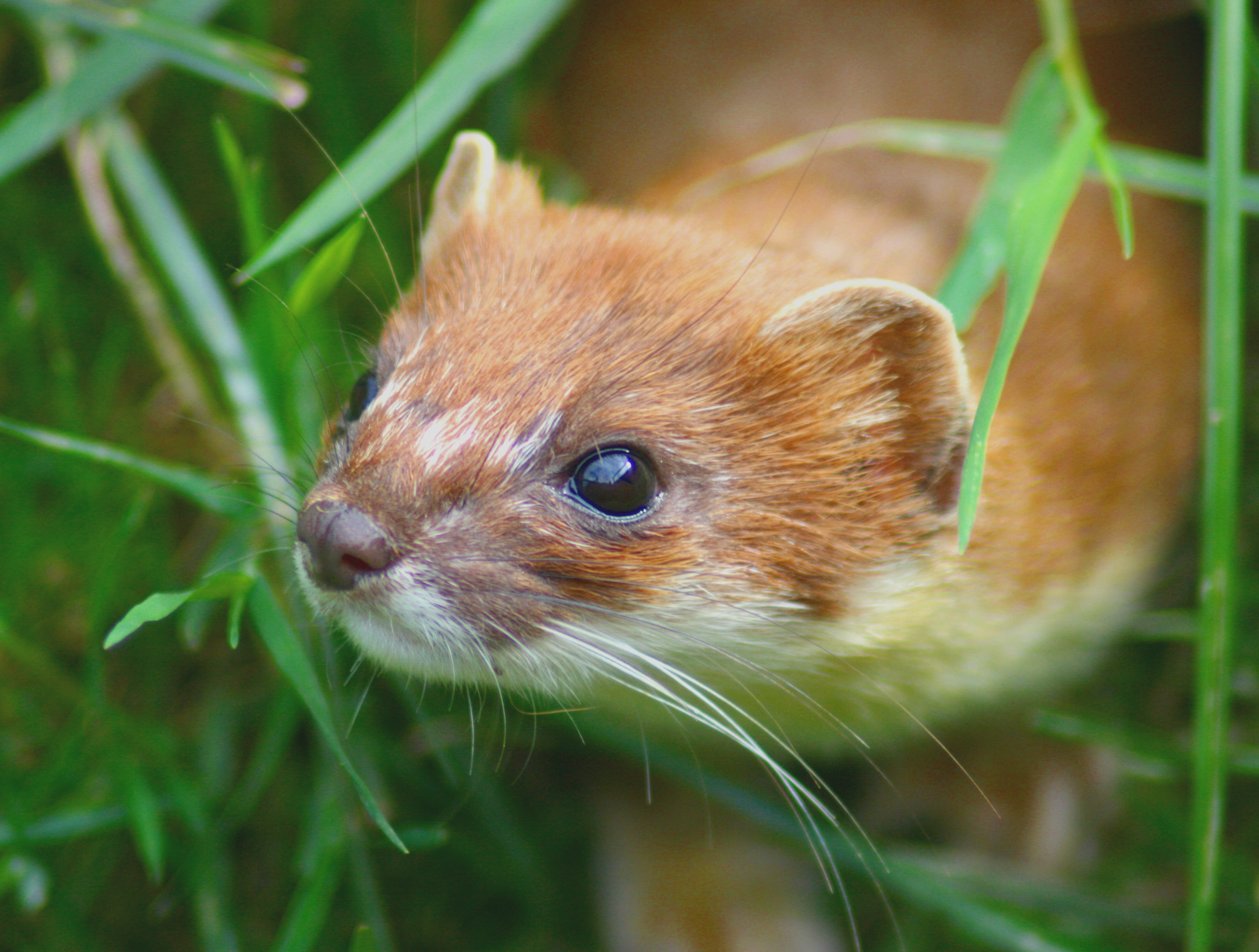
Short-tailed weasel

Order: Carnivora Family: Mustelidae

- Wolverine, Gulo gulo, alpine, coniferous forests, rare
- North American river otter, Lontra canadensis, rivers, lakes, ponds, common
- Pacific marten, Martes caurina, coniferous forests, common
- American ermine, Mustela richardsonii, willows to spruce/fir forests, common
- Long-tailed weasel, Neogale frenata, willows to spruce/fir forests, common
- American mink, Neogale vison, riparian forests, occasional
- Fisher, Pekania pennanti, forests, rare
- American badger, Taxidea taxus, sagebrush, common

== Skunks ==
Order: Carnivora Family: Mephitidae

- Striped skunk, Mephitis mephitis, riparian to forest, rare

== Hares and rabbits ==
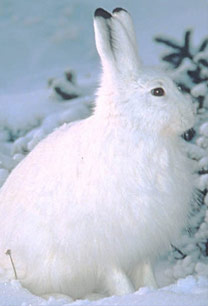
Snowshoe hare

Order: Lagomorpha Family: Leporidae

- Snowshoe hare, Lepus americanus, forests, willows, common
- White-tailed jackrabbit, Lepus townsendii, sagebrush, grasslands, common
- Desert cottontail, Sylvilagus audubonii, shrub lands, common
- Mountain cottontail, Sylvilagus nuttallii, shrub lands, common

== Pikas ==
Order: Lagomorpha Family: Ochotonidae

- American pika, Ochotona princeps, rocky slopes, common

== Shrews ==
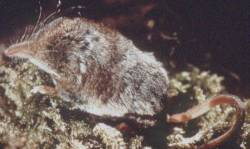
Masked shrew

Order: Soricomorpha Family: Soricidae

- Dusky shrew, Sorex monticolus, moist meadows, forests, common
- Masked shrew, Sorex cinereus, moist meadows, forests, common
- American water shrew, Sorex palustris, moist meadows, forests, common
- Preble's shrew, Sorex preblei, moist meadows, forests, rare, if present
- Dwarf shrew, Sorex nanus, moist meadows, forests, rare

== Beaver ==
Order: Rodentia Family: Castoridae

- Beaver, Castor canadensis, ponds, streams, approximately 500

== Squirrels ==
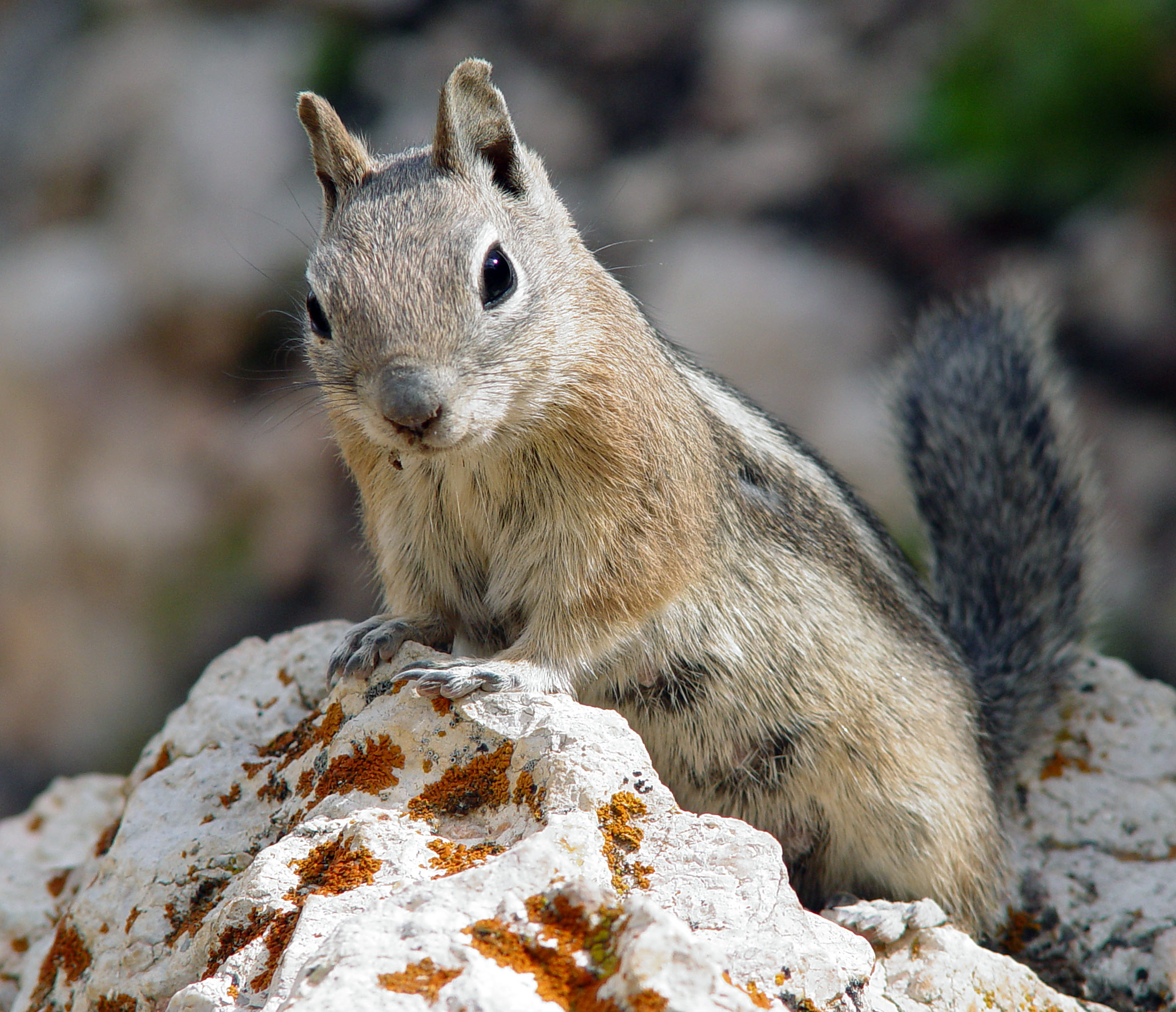
Golden-mantled ground squirrel

Order: Rodentia Family: Sciuridae

- Least chipmunk, Tamias minimus, forests, common
- Uinta chipmunk, Tamias umbrinus, forests, common
- Yellow-pine chipmunk, Tamias amoenus, forests, common
- Yellow-bellied marmot, Marmota flaviventris, rocky slopes, common
- Golden-mantled ground squirrel, Callospermophilus lateralis, forests, rocky slopes, common
- Northern flying squirrel, Glaucomys sabrinus, forests, occasional
- American red squirrel, Tamiasciurus hudsonicus, forests, common
- Uinta ground squirrel, Urocitellus armatus, sagebrush, meadows, common

== Pocket gophers ==
Order: Rodentia Family: Geomyidae

- Northern pocket gopher, Thomomys talpoides, sagebrush, meadows, forests, common

== Mice ==
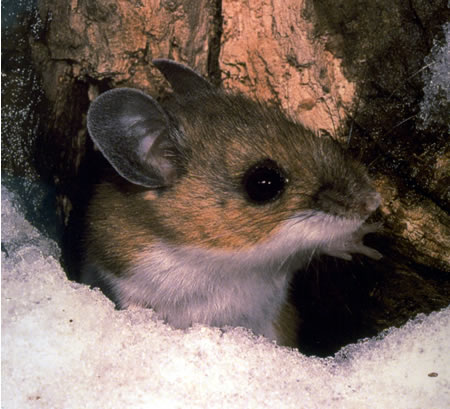
Deer mouse

Order: Rodentia Family: Cricetidae

- Deer mouse, Peromyscus maniculatus, grasslands, common

== Jumping mice ==
Order: Rodentia Family: Dipodidae

- Western jumping mouse, Zapus princeps, riparian, occasional

== Muskrats, voles and woodrats ==
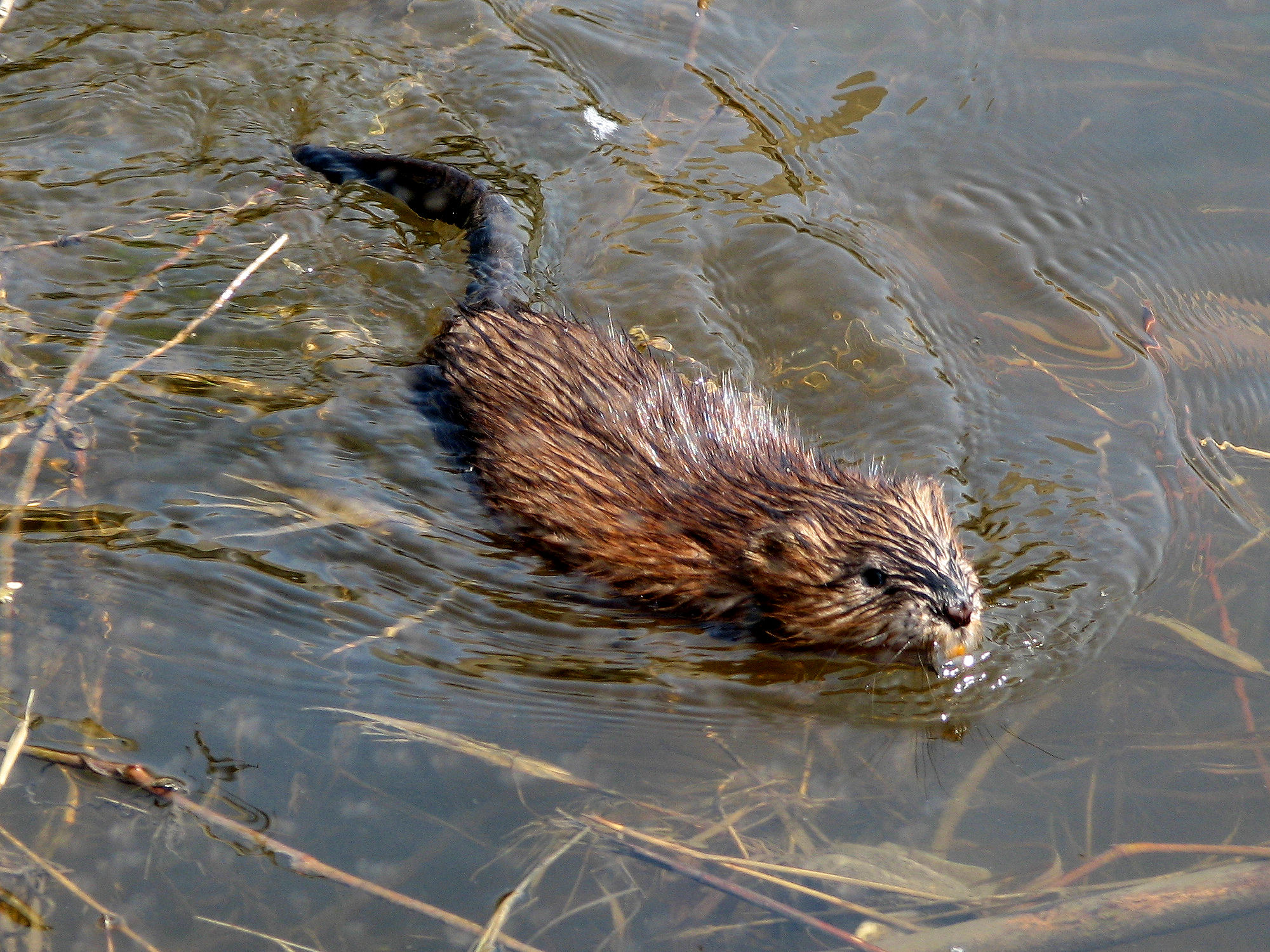
Muskrat

Order: Rodentia Family: Cricetidae

- Muskrat, Ondatra zibethicus, streams, lakes, ponds, common
- Western heather vole, Phenacomys intermedius, sagebrush to forests, occasional
- Long-tailed vole, Microtus longicaudus, moist meadows, common
- Meadow vole, Microtus pennsylvanicus, moist meadows, common
- Montane vole, Microtus montanus, moist meadows, common
- Southern red-backed vole, Myodes gapperi, dense forests, common
- Water vole, Microtus richardsoni, riparian, occasional
- Bushy-tailed woodrat, Neotoma cinerea, rocky slopes, common

== Porcupines ==
Order: Rodentia Family: Erethizontidae

- North American porcupine, Erethizon dorsatum, forests, sagebrush, willows, common

== Bats ==
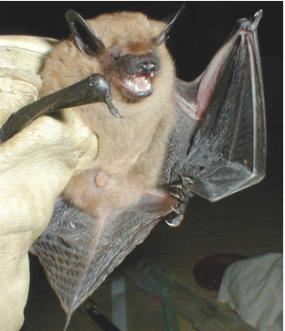
Big brown bat

Order: Chiroptera Family: Vespertilionidae

- Big brown bat, Eptesicus fuscus, roost in sheltered areas, common
- Fringe-tailed bat, Myotis thysanodes, roost in cliffs, large snags, uncommon
- Hoary bat, Lasiurus cinereus, roost in trees. uncommon
- Little brown bat, Myotis lucifugus, roost in caves, buildings, trees, common
- Long-eared bat, Myotis evotis, roost in cliffs, buildings, uncommon
- Long-legged bat, Myotis volans, roost in tree cavities, cliffs, buildings, common
- Silver-haired bat, Lasionycteris noctivagans, roost in trees, including snags, common
- Western small-footed bat, Myotis ciliolabrum, roost in rocky areas, caves, rare, if present
- Townsend's big-eared bat, Corynorhinus townsendii, roost in caves, uncommon
- Yuma bat, Myotis yumanensis, roost in caves, buildings, trees. rare, if present

== See also ==
- Animals of Yellowstone
- Mammals of Yellowstone National Park
