= Organ, New Mexico =

- Census-designated place
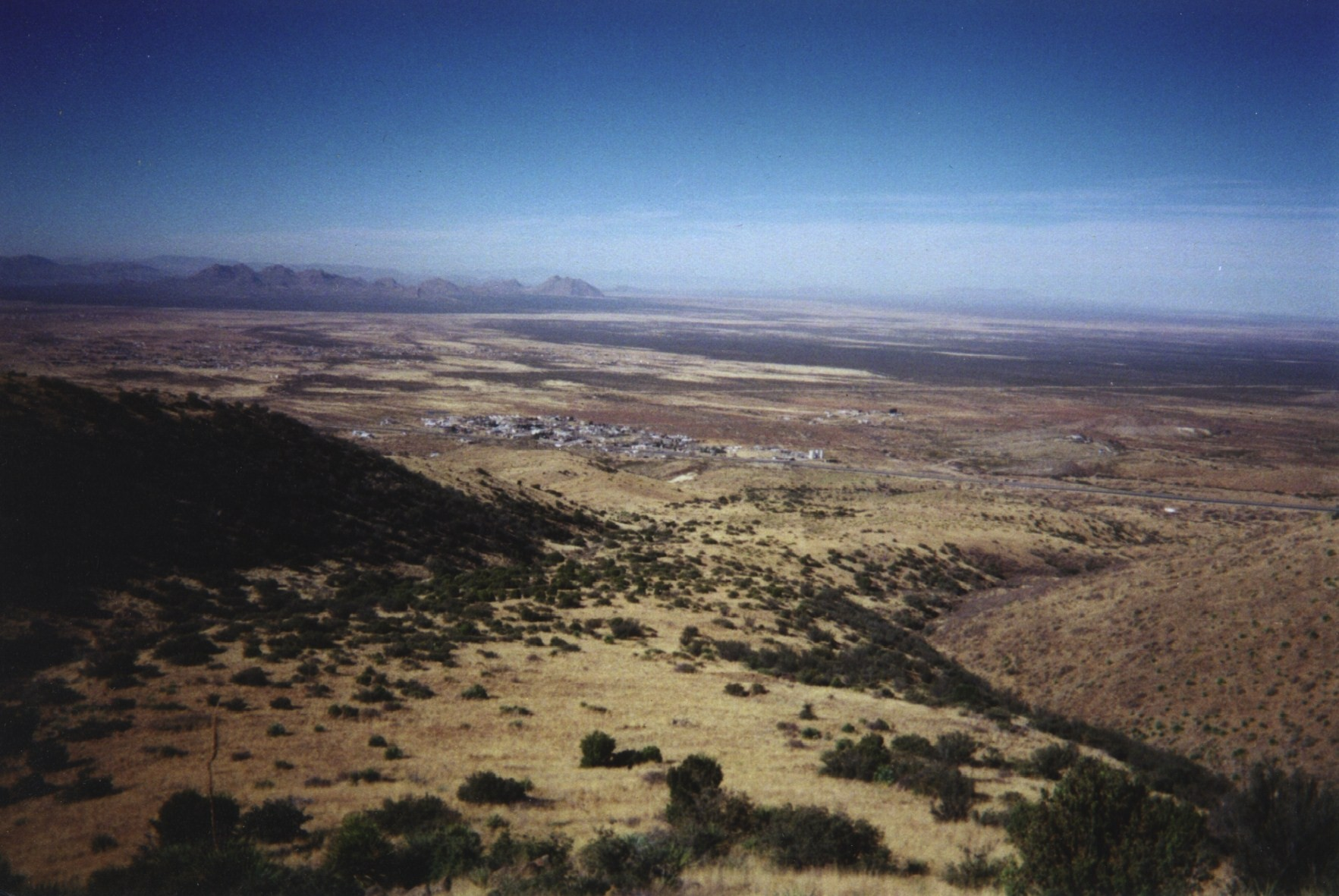
- Organ as seen from the San Agustin Pass looking north/west

- Location in the United States
- Coordinates: 32°25′30″N 106°36′09″W
- Country: United States
- State: New Mexico
- County: Dona Ana
- Founded: 1883

Area
  - Total: 0.86 sq mi (2.23 km^{2})
  - Land: 0.86 sq mi (2.23 km^{2})
  - Water: 0 sq mi (0.00 km^{2})
- Elevation: 5,056 ft (1,541 m)

Population (2020)
  - Total: 242
  - Density: 280.5/sq mi (108.31/km^{2})
- Time zone: UTC-7 (Mountain)
  - Summer (DST): UTC-6 (DST)
- Postal code: 88052
- Area code: 575
- FIPS code: 35-54430
- GNIS feature ID: 2584169

Organ is an unincorporated community and census-designated place in Doña Ana County, New Mexico, United States. As of the 2020 census, Organ had a population of 242.

== Description ==
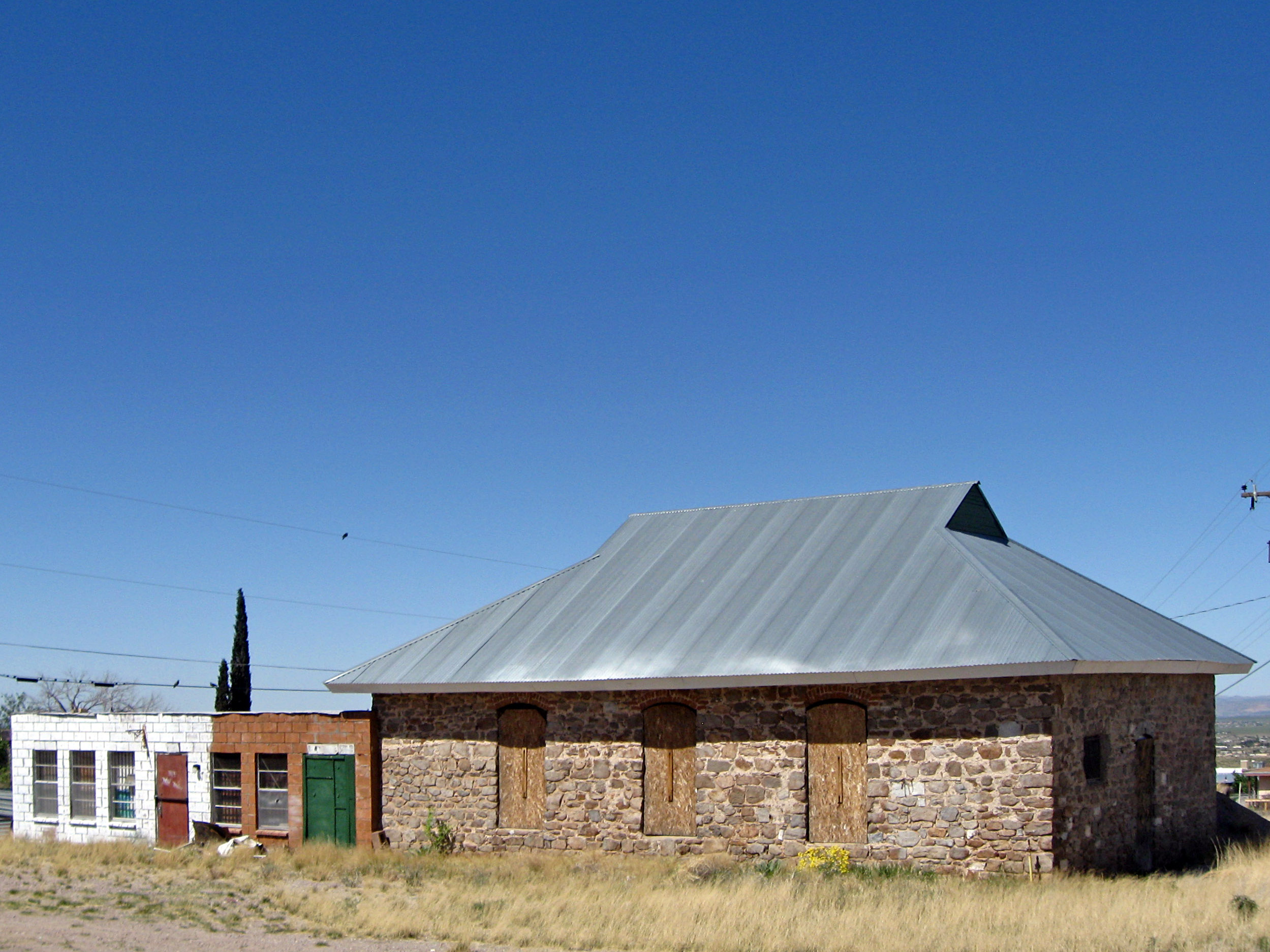
Organ's old schoolhouse, May 2010

Organ was started as a mining camp prior to the American Civil War. However, it was not officially established as a community until 1883. President Chester A. Arthur granted the 40-acre (160,000 m^{2}) parcel of land under congressional approval through a federal land grant to the Organ Mining Corporation in 1883. Mining operations near Organ produced gold, lead, iron, silver and other minerals. Actual mining in the Organ town site was prohibited. The largest production mine was the "Torpedo Mine". Organ originally had its own school, constable's office, community center, town square, post office, hotel, business district and cemetery. Organ also had two large mining furnaces for smelting ore and a geological assay office belonging to the mining company. In 1885 Organ's population was over 1,500 people.

In the 1930s the mines in the area became inundated with water and were no longer feasible for use, and with the onset of the Great Depression, mining operations ceased. However, with the opening of White Sands Missile Range and the testing of the nuclear weapons in 1945, Organ began to thrive again as a community providing homes and leisure services to military personnel and government contractors only a short distance from the main military post. Organ is very active supporting the military and White Sands Missile Range still.

Today, Organ is under the direct jurisdiction of Doña Ana County and the County Probate Judge as directed in the presidential order of 1883, because it was never incorporated. The state government recognizes Organ as an independent community under New Mexico State House Bill 523 of the 44th State Legislature in 1999, which recognized "Traditional Historic Communities". For this reason, Organ cannot be annexed by any municipality according to the provisions directed under this house bill.

Organ still has its own water and sewer utility service, and other services are provided independently. The Organ Community Center was improved in 2008 and is still located on land of the original town square. The roads are paved and improvements are still ongoing through the supervision of Dona Ana County. The Organ Post Office is still in operation and Organ still has a few businesses. The cemetery is still in use and is called the "Slumbering Mountain Cemetery" with newer and historic graves. Educational services for children are provided by the Las Cruces Public Schools in Las Cruces, New Mexico (the original Organ schoolhouse has been closed for some time). Organ is still an active community and has a rich history. There are roughly 100 households in the area currently.

Organ lies at the southwest foothills of the San Augustin Mountains, the terminal subrange at the south of the extensive San Andres Mountains. Across San Augustin Pass on US 70 at the south of the San Augustins lie the Organ Mountains.

== Education ==
It is located in Las Cruces Public Schools.

== Demographics ==
Historical population
Census	Pop.	Note	%±
2020	242		—
U.S. Decennial Census
