= Oscura Mountains =

Mountain range in New Mexico, USA

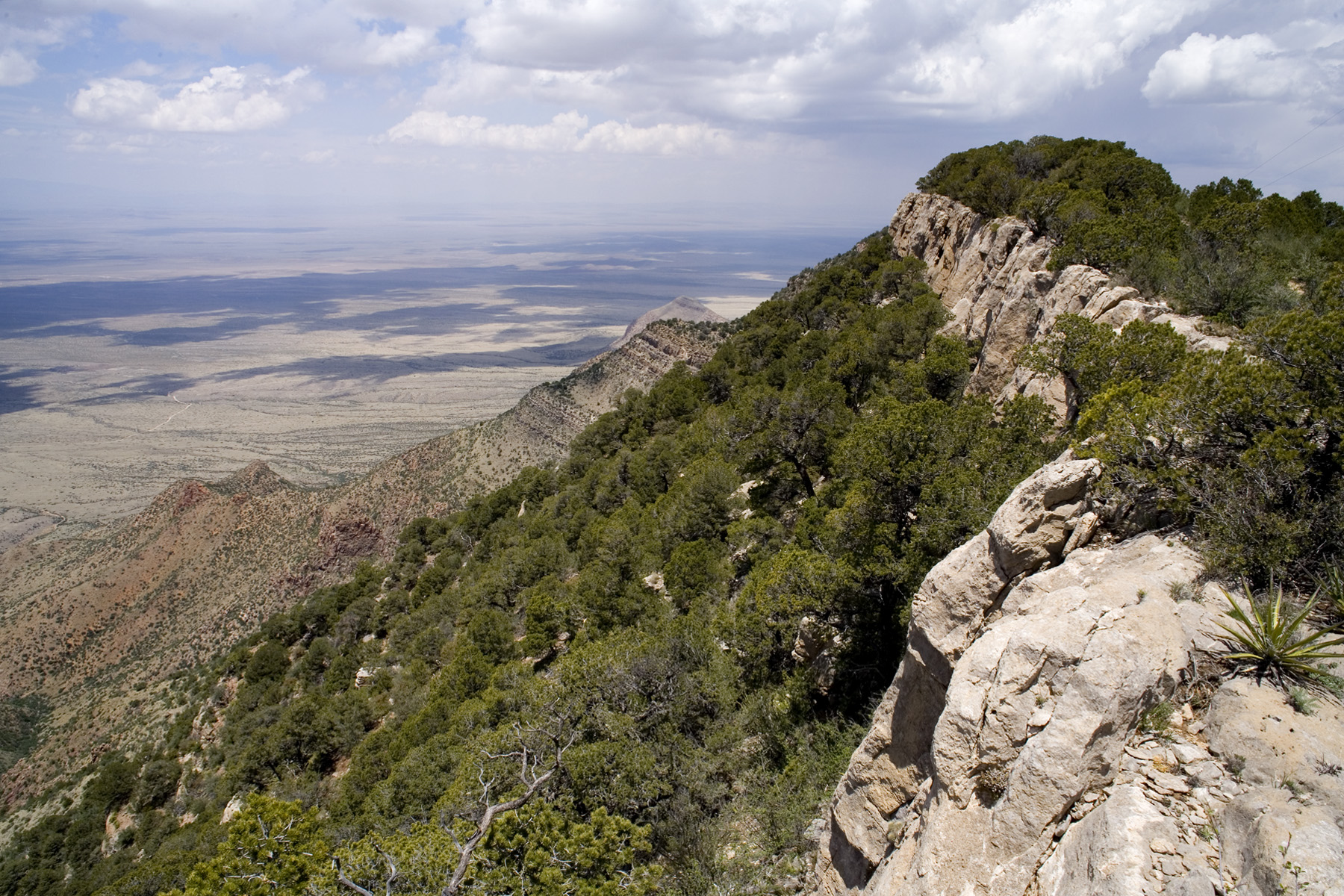
Looking north on the crest of the Oscura Mountains, Socorro County

Oscura Mountains, originally known to the Spanish as the Sierra Oscura, are a ridge of mountains, trending north and south, east of the Jornada del Muerto and west of the Tularosa Valley. The word oscura means "dark" and refers to the dark color of the mountains due to the Pinyon-juniper vegetation at their higher elevations. The Oscuras are located in Socorro County and Lincoln County, New Mexico. Their southern end is at 33°30′30″N 106°18′45″W and their northern end is at 33°49′15″N 106°22′20″W near North Oscura Peak. Their highest elevation is Oscura Peak at 8,625 feet (2,629 meters).

The Oscura Mountains extend southward about 30 miles (48 km) from U.S. Route 380 and are 6 miles (9.7 km) to 10 miles (16 km) wide. To the west, dropping off sharply from the crest of the Oscuras, the austere desert of the Jornada del Muerto (Spanish: Dead Man's Journey) has an average elevation of about 5,000 ft (1,500 m). Southwest and separated from the Oscuras by Oscura Gap are the lower-lying Little Burro Mountains. The San Andres Mountains lie beyond the Little Burro Mountains to the south and are separated from them by Mockingbird Gap. The Oscura range is bounded on the north by Wash Hale Canyon. The Oscuras slope off more gently to the east and are bounded on the northeast by the Chupadera Mesa. The Tularosa Basin to the east also has an average elevation of about 5,000 ft (1,500 m)

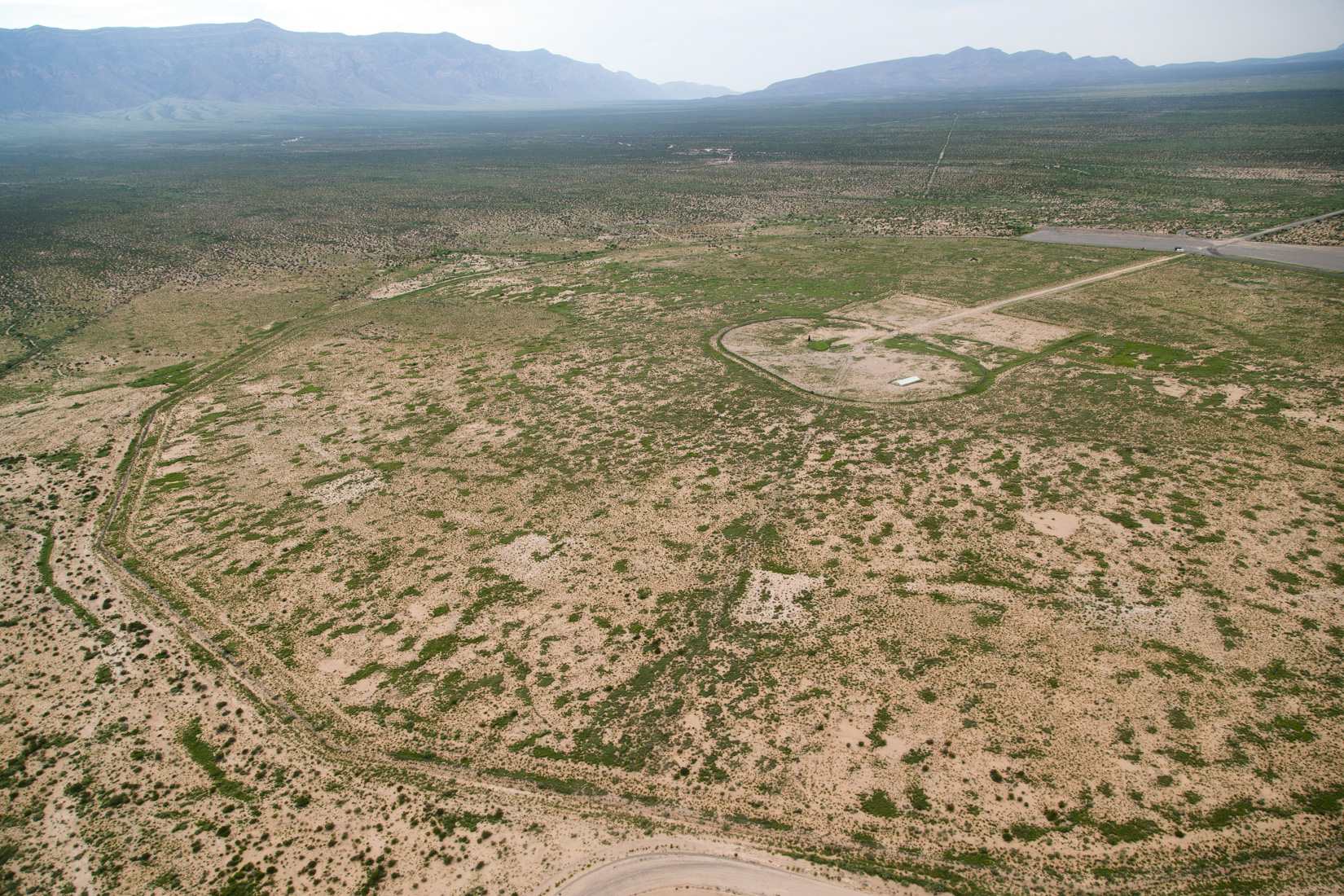
The Trinity test site with the Oscura Mountains at top left and the Little Burro Mountains at top right.

The Oscura Mountains are located within the White Sands Missile Range and public access is restricted. The Trinity site, the location of the first test of an atomic bomb in 1945, is 11 km (6.8 miles) northwest of Oscura Peak. North Oscura Peak is the location of an Air Force Research Laboratory (AFRL) site. It rises to an elevation of 7,976 feet (2,431 meters).

== Climate ==
The Oscura Mountains are a Sky island rising above semi-arid steppe and arid desert. The higher elevations of the mountains result in cooler temperatures and higher precipitation. The surrounding areas receive about 10 in (25 cm) annually in precipitation while the higher elevations of the Oscuras receive from 16 in (41 cm) to 20 in (51 cm) average precipitation which is sufficient to support a pinyon-juniper woodland. Surface water is rare except for ephemeral streams on the east side of the range and a few springs. Most precipitation is received between July and October. Average maximum temperatures at North Oscura peak, elevation 7,976 ft (2,431 m), are from 27.3 °C (81.1 °F) in June to 5.2 °C (41.4 °F) in January. Average minimum temperatures range from 13.5 °C (56.3 °F) in July to −3.2 °C (26.2 °F) in January.

== Flora and fauna ==
Five vegetation types typical of New Mexico clothe the Oscura mountains. At the highest elevations is a pinyon woodland mainly on the eastern slopes and consisting mostly of two-needle pinyon. Below the pinyons in elevation on the eastern flanks is a juniper woodland interspersed with savannas. Still lower on the eastern slopes and also on the western slopes is montane scrub, consisting mostly of mountain mahogany and wavy leaf oak. Chaparral consisting mostly of shrub live oak and grassland dominated by blue gramma is found at low to mid elevations. Large animals include mule deer, black bear, and the non-native oryx. This mountain range is the exclusive home of the Oscura Mountains Colorado Chipmunk, a local subspecies of the Colorado Chipmunk.
