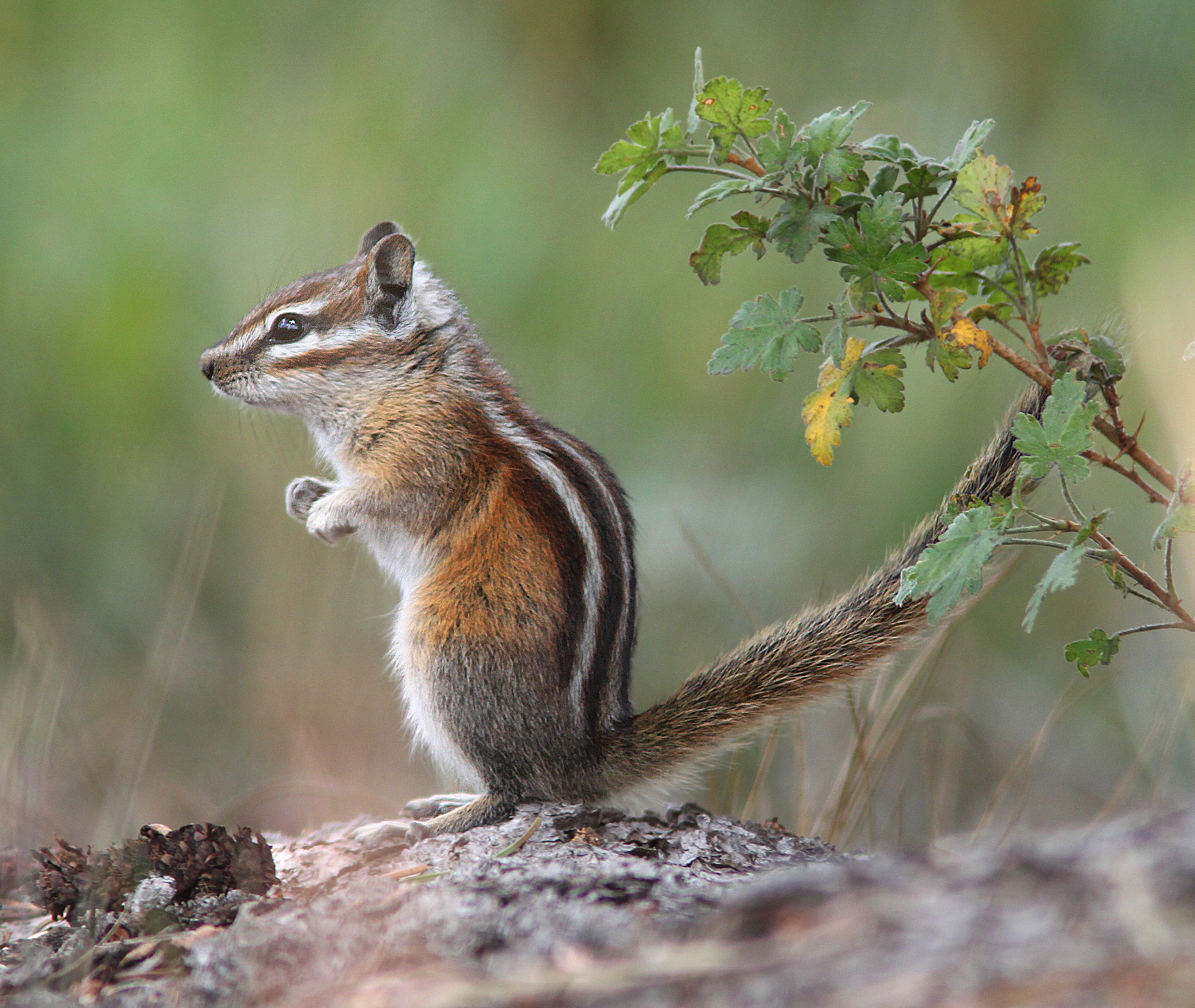

Conservation status
- Least Concern (IUCN 3.1)

Scientific classification
- Kingdom: Animalia
- Phylum: Chordata
- Class: Mammalia
- Order: Rodentia
- Family: Sciuridae
- Genus: Neotamias
- Species: N. quadrivittatus

Binomial name
- Neotamias quadrivittatus (Say, 1823)
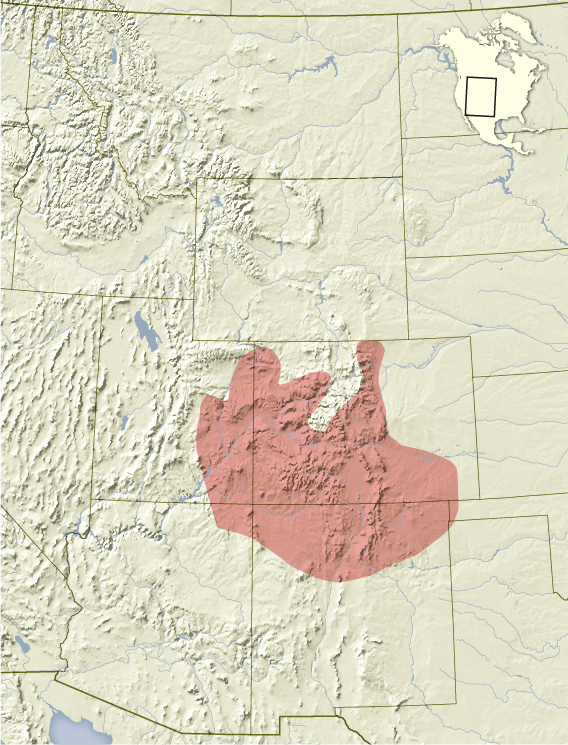
- Distribution of the Colorado chipmunk

Synonyms
- Tamias quadrivittatus

= Colorado chipmunk =

Species of rodent

The Colorado chipmunk (Neotamias quadrivittatus) is a species of chipmunk in the squirrel family Sciuridae. It is endemic to Colorado, Utah, Arizona and New Mexico in the United States.

== Description ==
This species is the largest of the three species of chipmunks found in the Colorado Front Range (which also include the least chipmunk and the Uinta chipmunk). On average it weighs about 62 grams (2.2 oz). Chipmunks are distinguished from ground squirrels in that their faces have a stripe going across under the eye. There are no dimorphic differences between males and females.

Their vocalizations are essential for defending their territories.

Three subspecies are recognized.

- N. q. australis - Organ Mountains, New Mexico
- N. q. oscuraensis - Oscura Mountains, New Mexico
- N. q. quadrivittatus - Colorado, northern New Mexico, northern Arizona, eastern Utah

== Habitat ==
The Colorado chipmunk primarily occupies coniferous forests in the Southern Rocky Mountains. In northeastern Colorado, the Colorado chipmunk's range is strictly bounded by competition with the higher-elevation Uinta chipmunk and it predominately occurs in open woodlands between 1,500 metres (4,900 ft) and 2,100 metres (6,900 ft). In southern Colorado, where Uinta chipmunks are absent, the Colorado chipmunk occurs in montane forests and meadows up to 3,200 metres (10,500 ft).

The isolated populations of Colorado chipmunks which occur in the Oscura mountains and Organ mountains exhibit distinct habitat preferences from northern populations. Oscura mountain Colorado chipmunks are closely associated with old-growth pinyon-juniper woodland. In the Organ Mountains, chipmunks depend on the cool micro-climates created by arroyos.

== Diet ==
Their diet consists of seeds, berries, flowers and insects. Mountain mahogany, prickly-pear, juniper berries, currants, wild cherries, and snowberry are major food sources. Colorado chipmunks are not active above ground during the winter, instead relying on underground food caches it gathers during the fall.

== Reproduction ==
Depending on the elevation at which the chipmunk is found, it may range from 1-2 litters. Most commonly copulation occurs in the spring when the chipmunks emerge from their burrows. The females are only receptive of males for a couple of days after emerging from the burrow. About a month after copulation, the female will give birth to a litter that may have anywhere between 5-8 altricial young. Within 40–50 days they will be weaned from their mother.
