= Oscura Peak =

Mountain in New Mexico, United States

Coordinates: 33°38′48″N 106°22′23″W

Oscura Peak is a mountain summit in the Oscura Mountains in Socorro County, New Mexico. Its elevation is 8,625 feet (2,629 meters).
