= Mount Ellen chipmunk =

Conservation status
- Critically Imperiled (NatureServe)

Scientific classification
- Kingdom: Animalia
- Phylum: Chordata
- Class: Mammalia
- Infraclass: Placentalia
- Order: Rodentia
- Family: Sciuridae
- Genus: Neotamias
- Species: N. umbrinus
- Subspecies: N. u. sedulus

Trinomial name
- Neotamias umbrinus sedulus (White, 1953)

Subspecies of rodent

The Mount Ellen chipmunk (Neotamias umbrinus sedulus), or the Mount Ellen Uinta chipmunk, also spelt as the Mt. Ellen chipmunk, is a rare subspecies of the Uinta chipmunk that is endemic to Mt. Ellen, Henry Mountains, Garfield County, Utah. Not many threats persist for the subspecies, so the current conservation status refers to its limitedness in the region. It is listed as "Critically Imperiled" by NatureServe because of its limited natural range.
