= North Oscura Peak =

Mountain in New Mexico, United States

Coordinates: 33°45′08″N 106°22′19″W

North Oscura Peak, is a summit in the Oscura Mountains in Socorro County, New Mexico is the location of an Air Force Research Laboratory (AFRL) site in the northern portion of the White Sands Missile Range. It rises to an elevation of 7,976 feet (2,431 meters).

== History ==
North Oscura Peak was a former Army missile tracking site. Designed to withstand rocket strikes, the walls at the site are 4 feet (1.2 m) thick, with 1,200 tons of concrete embedded six feet in bedrock. In 1972 a large concrete pad was built with associated power to operate the LAD (Laser Acquisition and Direction) system. It was named the Laser Airborne Simulation and Test (LAST) Site. This was a test program by the Air Force Weapons Laboratory Laser Division at Kirtland AFB. It was during the Vietnam War, and was to examine the potential of detecting optically directed antiaircraft systems using airborne laser scanning. The program was terminated with the conclusion of the Vietnam War. The Laser Division became the Directed Energy Directorate, which refurbished the site in June 1997, spending approximately $700,000 to repair the buildings, bring in the telescope, build a clean room, and install lasers, advanced optics, computers and test instrumentation. The budget also included improvements to the receiver station at Salinas Peak, where three portable shelters, an electronics room and an optics room were installed.

== Programs ==
The facility is designed to assemble and evaluate advanced sensor, tracking and atmospheric compensation systems. In 2002 the goal was to improve the ability of the United States Air Force to track missiles and then efficiently transmit laser energy through the atmosphere to destroy them. The site is managed by the AFRL−Air Force Research Laboratory Directed Energy Directorate, headquartered at Kirtland Air Force Base in Albuquerque, about 140 miles (230 km) to the north.

Overall, 40 people are working on the project, most of whom reside in offices at the Directed Energy Directorate at Kirtland Air Force Base, about 140 miles (230 km) away. Six to eight people work at the site with four of them there full-time.

Three lasers are typically used at the site: a 30 watt tracking laser, a 30 watt adaptive optics beacon laser, and a 3 watt scoring laser. The scoring laser acts as a surrogate for the high energy weapons laser.

=== Airborne Laser program ===
Atop 8,000-foot (2,400 m) high North Oscura Peak, a 30-inch (760 mm) telescope is used to send and receive laser light to and from Salinas Peak, another site approximately 35 miles (56 km) away. Sophisticated instrumentation is used to measure the extent that Earth's atmosphere distorts the laser light. Then, deformable optics are used: mirrors that can change their shape to compensate for the distortions.

The information gained from these tests will benefit any follow on efforts to the Airborne Laser — a large cargo aircraft, equipped with a high energy laser that can destroy theater ballistic missiles hundreds of miles away. In contrast to the Airborne Laser, which is designed to operate at altitudes around 40,000 feet (12,000 m), these tests are taking place on peaks that are between 8,000 and 9,000 feet (2,700 m) in elevation. The denser air at these lower test elevations makes it possible to take the collected data and scale it to the higher altitudes and longer ranges envisioned for the Airborne Laser. Research at this site may be applied on the first three Airborne Laser production aircraft or as advanced weaponry on tactical aircraft.

During a test, North Oscura and Salinas Peaks are in constant communications, and a laser cannot propagate unless several failsafe measures are in force at both locations. These are among the safety precautions in place to ensure eye-safe operations.

=== Moveable telescope program ===
A 30-inch (760 mm) telescope was initially used, one of the largest refractor telescopes in the world. However, in late January 1999, it was replaced with a $2.5 million, 1 metre (39 inches) telescope built for the Research Laboratory by Contraves Brasher Systems in Pittsburgh, Pennsylvania.

Unlike the initial telescope, which was stationary, the new telescope was designed to be used with a moveable mount. Capable of moving down 5 degrees and revolving 360 degrees, it can be used with moving targets to simulate more realistic wartime conditions. In order to properly house the new telescope, an isolation free structural steel tower was built in December.

=== Test targets program ===
By June 1999, the Air Force will be able to fire its nondestructive lasers at a variety of missiles being launched at White Sands Missile Range. Although three to four missile launches may take place each year, Laboratory scientists will be getting better data from a different “target” — a single engine propeller driven Cessna Caravan airplane. This test aircraft will carry a scoring board comprising a range of detectors that will be able to gather greater amounts and more complete information than will be available from the missiles.

== See also ==
- Starfire Optical Range
- White Sands Missile Range−related topics
