= Fremont's chipmunk =

Conservation status
- Least Concern (IUCN 3.1)

Scientific classification
- Kingdom: Animalia
- Phylum: Chordata
- Class: Mammalia
- Infraclass: Placentalia
- Order: Rodentia
- Family: Sciuridae
- Genus: Neotamias
- Species: N. umbrinus
- Subspecies: N. u. fremonti

Trinomial name
- Neotamias umbrinus fremonti (White, 1953)

Synonyms
- • Tamias umbrinus fremonti (White, 1953)

Subspecies of rodent

Fremont's chipmunk (Neotamias umbrinus fremonti), or Fremont's Uinta chipmunk, is a subspecies of the Uinta chipmunk that is endemic to parts of Wyoming.
