= Mountaineer chipmunk =

Scientific classification
- Kingdom: Animalia
- Phylum: Chordata
- Class: Mammalia
- Infraclass: Placentalia
- Order: Rodentia
- Family: Sciuridae
- Genus: Neotamias
- Species: N. umbrinus
- Subspecies: N. u. montanus

Trinomial name
- Neotamias umbrinus montanus (White, 1953)

Synonyms
- Tamias umbrinus montanus White, 1953

Subspecies of rodent

The mountaineer chipmunk (Neotamias umbrinus montanus), also known as the mountaineer Uinta chipmunk, southern Rocky Mountains chipmunk, or the southern Rocky Mountains Uinta chipmunk, is a subspecies of the Uinta chipmunk that is native to parts of Colorado, southwestern Wyoming, and far northeastern Utah. It may overlap with the nominate subspecies, Neotamias umbrinus umbrinus in northeastern Utah.
