= Salinas Peak =

Mountain in New Mexico, United States

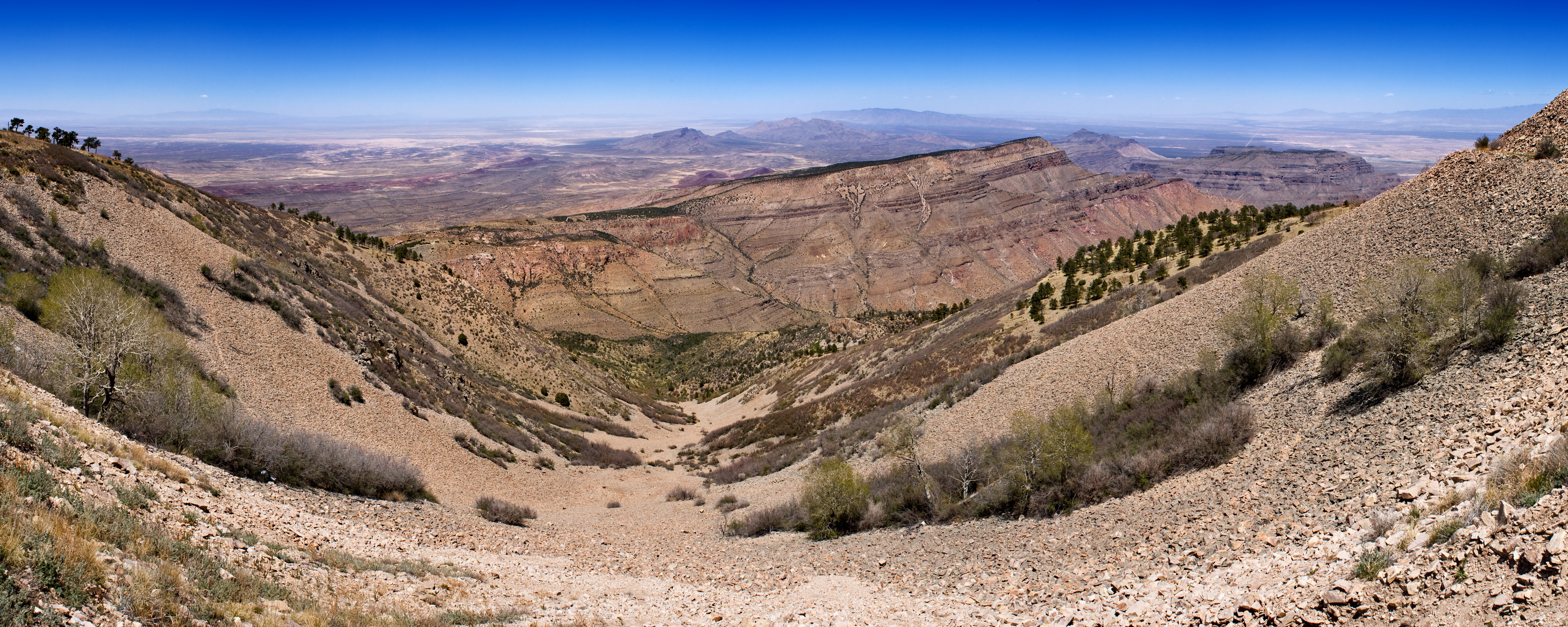
- Salinas Peak

Highest point
- Elevation: 8,967 ft (2,733 m) NAVD 88
- Prominence: 3,605 ft (1,099 m)
- Coordinates: 33°17′54″N 106°31′53″W

Geography
- Location within New Mexico
- Location: Sierra County, New Mexico, U.S.
- Parent range: San Andres Mountains
- Topo map: USGS Salinas Peak

Climbing
- Easiest route: road (no public access)

Salinas Peak is the highest point in the San Andres Mountains of south-central New Mexico, in the United States. It lies near the northern end of the range, about 50 miles (80 km) northwest of Alamogordo and 50 miles (80 km) southeast of Socorro. To the east lies the Tularosa Basin, while to the west is the Jornada del Muerto.

The peak is located within the White Sands Missile Range, and hence is closed to the public. However a road on the northwest side leads to the top, where there are radio towers and a heliport. About 20 miles (32 km) to the north lies the Trinity Site, where the first atomic bomb test occurred in 1945. Bighorn sheep, mule deer, and mountain lion are present in the area, which has retained much of its wilderness character outside of the few installations of the Missile Range.

Like many of the San Andres Mountains, Salinas Peak is rugged, rising sharply 4,900 feet (1,500 m) out of the surrounding basins. This makes it one of New Mexico's largest peaks in terms of local relief. It is a northwest-tilted fault-block, with a steep southeastern escarpment. The peak juts out to the east by a few miles from the main ridge trend, leading to deeply incised canyons on the north and south sides of the peak. Only a small section of the northwestern side is moderately angled.

== See also ==
- North Oscura Peak
- Starfire Optical Range
