= Inyo chipmunk =

Conservation status
- Least Concern (IUCN 3.1)

Scientific classification
- Kingdom: Animalia
- Phylum: Chordata
- Class: Mammalia
- Infraclass: Placentalia
- Order: Rodentia
- Family: Sciuridae
- Genus: Neotamias
- Species: N. umbrinus
- Subspecies: N. u. inyoensis

Trinomial name
- Neotamias umbrinus inyoensis (Merriam, 1897)

Subspecies of rodent

The Inyo chipmunk (Neotamias umbrinus inyoensis), or the Inyo Uinta chipmunk, is a subspecies of the Uinta chipmunk that is native to parts of central Nevada and eastern California, going into far north Arizona. It was described by Clinton Hart Merriam in 1897.
