= San Andres National Wildlife Refuge =

- IUCN category IV (habitat/species management area)
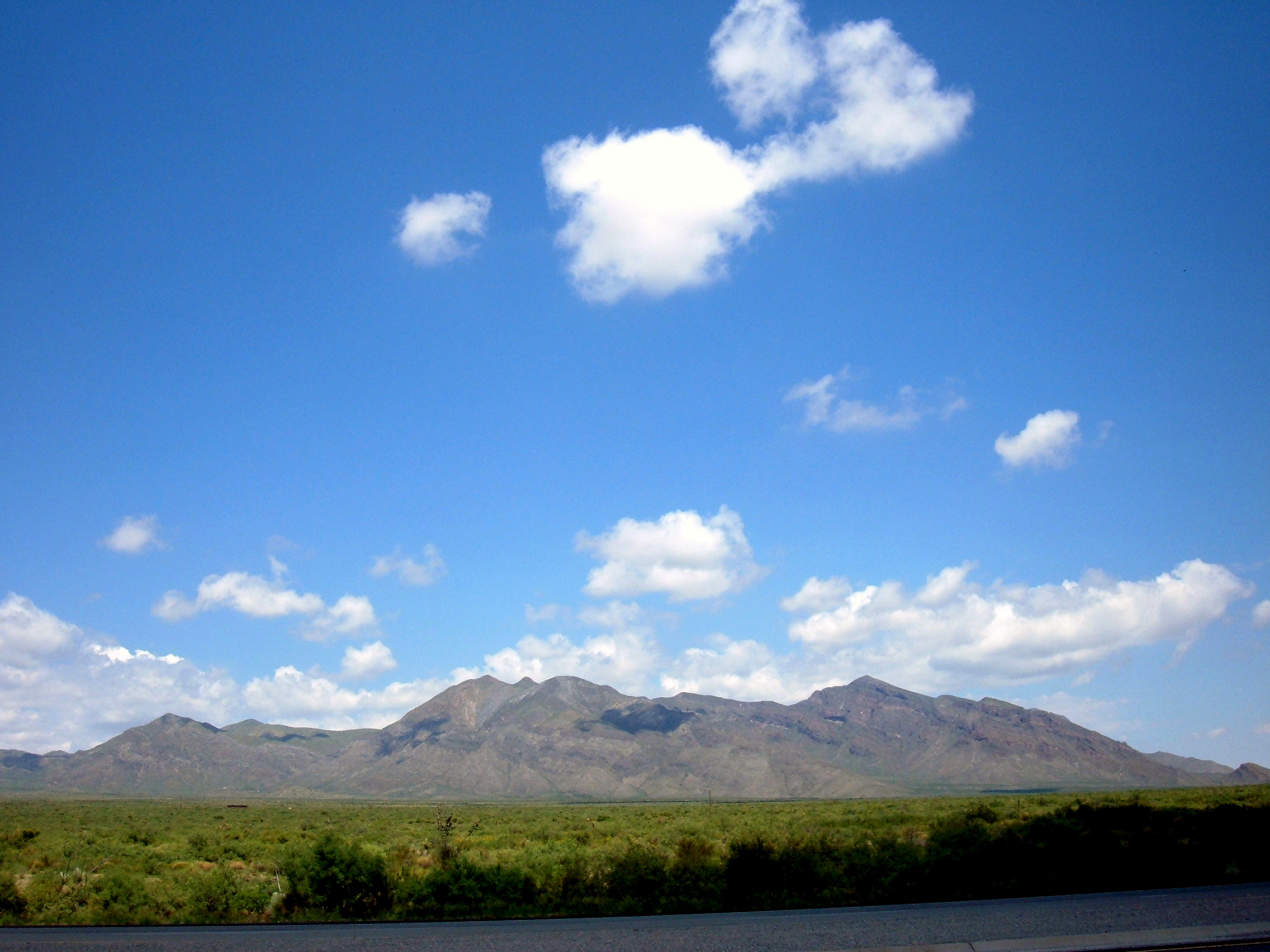

- Location within the United States
- Location: Doña Ana County, New Mexico, United States
- Nearest city: Las Cruces, NM
- Coordinates: 32°41′29″N 106°32′28″W
- Area: 57,215 acres (231.54 km^{2})
- Established: 1941
- Governing body: U.S. Fish & Wildlife Service
- Website: San Andres National Wildlife Refuge

The San Andres National Wildlife Refuge is located in the southern San Andres Mountains of southcentral New Mexico, USA. The refuge, which lies within the northernmost extension of the Chihuahuan Desert, has elevations ranging from 4,200 feet (1,300 m) to 8,239 feet (2,511 m) feet. Refuge habitats vary from creosote and Chihuahuan desert grasslands in the bajadas to pinyon-juniper woodlands at higher elevations. A few springs, seeps, and seasonal streams provide water for wildlife and riparian habitats in the refuge.

San Andres NWR is completely surrounded by the White Sands Missile Range and is closed to the public for security reasons.

== Description ==
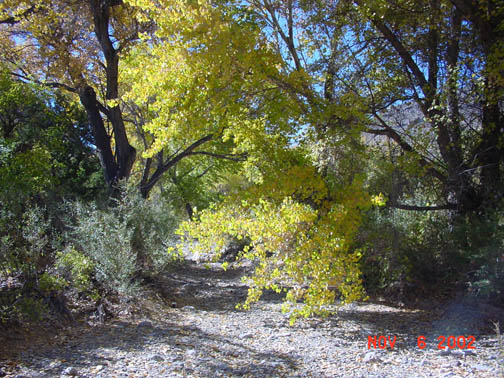
San Andres Spring with fall cottonwoods. San Andres spring is one of several springs creating small riparian environments.

The San Andres National Wildlife Refuge preserves the largest intact Chihuahuan desert mountain range in the U.S. The refuge runs 21 miles north to south at the southern end of the San Andres Mountains. San Andres Peak is the highest point at 8,239 feet (2,511 m). Bennett and Big Brushy Mountains rise to more than 7,000 feet (2,100 m). The range is a fault-block tilted to the west. The eastern slopes of the San Andres rise sharply from the Tularosa Basin now largely part of the White Sands military base. The western slopes are more gradual, merging into the Jornada del Muerto.

The refuge is in the Upper Sonoran life zone characterized by semi-desert vegetation and grassland. One hundred and seventy two species of birds, including 5 species of hummingbirds, have been seen on the refuge. Large mammals include mule deer, mountain lion, desert bighorn sheep, black bear, and the introduced oryx. On rare occasions, javelina have been seen.

The average precipitation on the refuge is 13 inches (330 mm) annually, although it is highly variable ranging from about 7 to 25 inches per year. Multi-year droughts are frequent. Most precipitation comes in the summer. At least 10 springs and spring complexes on the refuge provide water for wildlife and create riparian zones with cottonwood, willow, and ash trees. Some of the springs have sufficient flow to create live streams that run for several hundred yards before becoming dry washes with water only after major rainstorms. The springs are located at elevations of 4,900 feet (1,500 m) to 6,000 feet (1,800 m) in elevation.

== Desert bighorn sheep and oryx ==
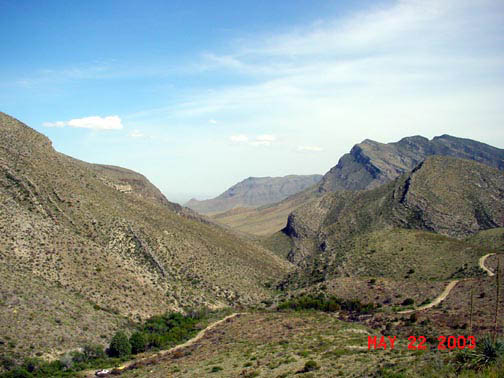
Ash Canyon and its springs create a lush corridor of vegetation amidst the desert of the San Andres mountains.

The San Andres National Wildlife Refuge was created to preserve the desert bighorn sheep which was becoming rare in much of its range. At the time of the creation of the refuge, in 1941, the population of desert bighorn sheep was 33. With protection, this number increased to 140 in 1950 before declining to 70 after a severe drought. Grazing on the refuge was ended in 1952 and the numbers of the herd increased to about 200 in the 1970s. Disease then struck the herd and only one lone female remained alive in 1997. Beginning in 1999, desert bighorns were re-introduced into San Andres from other areas and their numbers slowly increased to about 100 in 2012. San Andres NWR is the largest area of protected land for desert bighorns in New Mexico.

The South African oryx or Gemsbok, a large desert antelope native to Botswana, Namibia and South Africa, was introduced into White Sands Missile Range in the neighboring Tularosa Basin during 1969, in hopes of attracting big game hunters and increasing state income from sales of hunting licenses. Oryx numbers quickly grew to about 3,000 and their range expanded into San Andres National Wildlife Refuge as well as adjacent areas. By 1997, at least 50 oryx inhabited the refuge, successfully competing for scarce resources with bighorn sheep and mule deer because oryx need little or no water to survive, getting their moisture from the plants they eat. Except for calves, the oryx is too large to be preyed on by mountain lions and other local carnivores.

Oryx may also impact bighorn and deer by harboring several diseases that are thought or known to reduce recovery chances of bighorn and deer populations. In 2001, fecal and serological samples were collected from over 100 oryx at White Sands Missile Range and also an unspecified number at San Andres NWR, and tested for evidence of a range of pathogens. Exposure to Parainfluenza-3 virus was detected in 20% of 50 WSMR animals tested for this pathogen, while two-thirds had been exposed to Bovine Respiratory Syncytial Virus, and almost all animals showed evidence of exposure to Bluetongue Virus as well as Malignant Catarrhal Fever. Pasteurella trehalosi was detected in oryx from San Andres NWR. Pneumonic pasteurellosis can cause high mortality in bighorn sheep, and susceptibility to the disease is higher in bighorn previously exposed to Parainfluenza-3 or Bovine Respiratory Syncytial Virus. Deer on the other hand are especially vulnerable to Malignant Catarrhal Fever.

To limit the number of oryx on the San Andres NWR and White Sands Missile Range, New Mexico state with the cooperation of the Fish and Wildlife Service issues permits to hunt oryx. Between 2000 and 2007, a reported total of 284 animals in San Andres NWR were killed by hunting. More recently, about 50 animals are culled per year.
