= San Andres Mountains =

Mountain range in New Mexico, United States

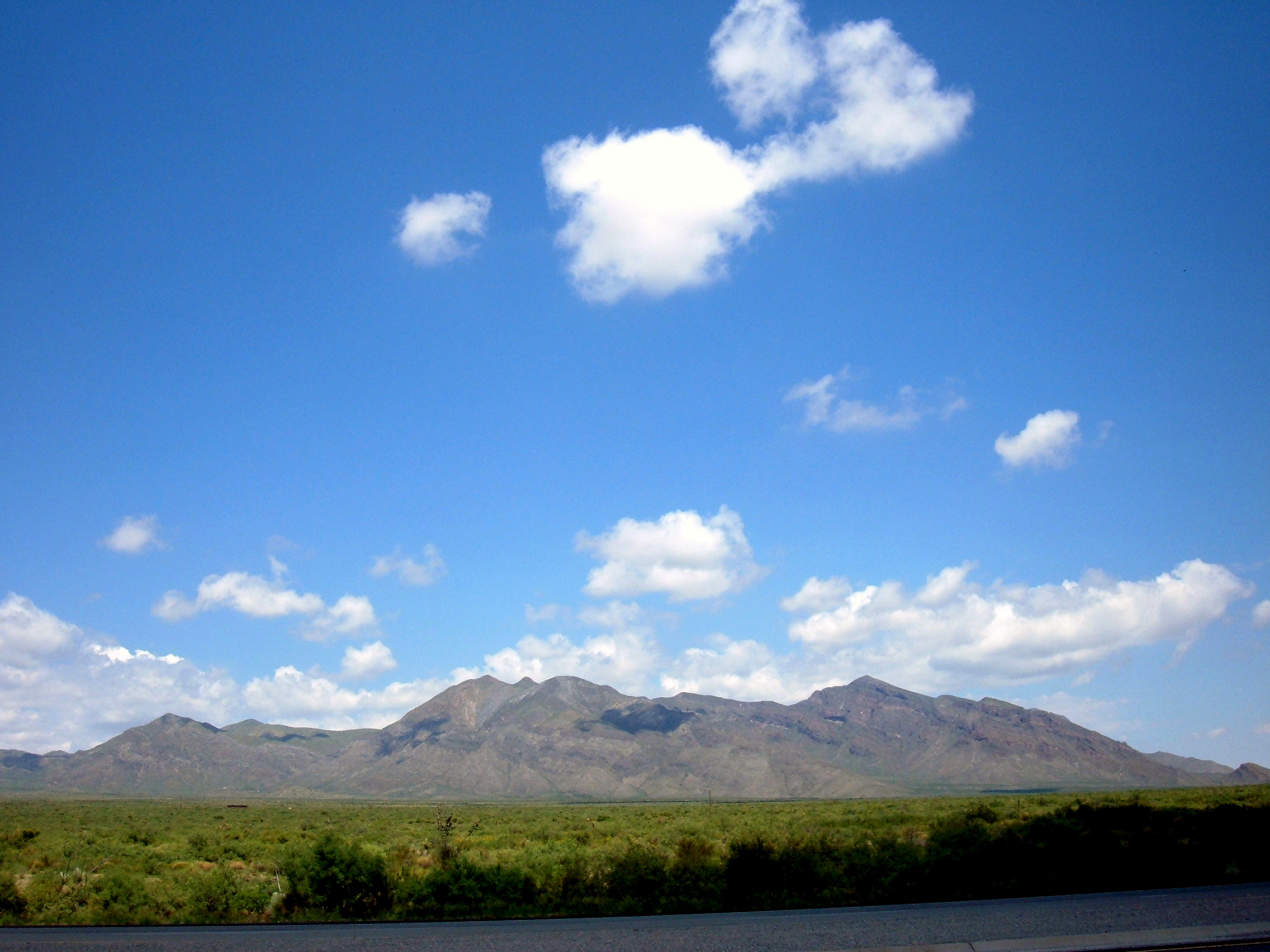
- Black and Bennett Mts. on the southeastern end of the San Andres Mountains

Highest point
- Peak: Salinas Peak
- Elevation: 8,965 ft (2,733 m)
- Coordinates: 33°17′55″N 106°31′53″W

Dimensions
- Length: 75 mi (121 km) N-S
- Width: 12 mi (19 km) W-E

Geography
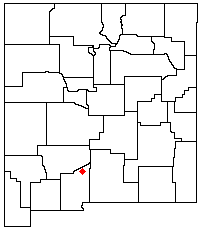
- Location of the San Andres Mountains within New Mexico
- Country: United States
- State: New Mexico
- Borders on: Organ Mountains

Geology
- Rock type: Limestone

The San Andres Mountains are a mountain range in the southwestern U.S. state of New Mexico, in the counties of Socorro, Sierra, and Doña Ana. The range extends about 75 miles (121 km) north to south, but is only about 12 miles (19 km) wide at their widest. The highest peak in the San Andres Mountains is Salinas Peak, at 8,965 feet (2,733 m).

== Geography ==
Though nearly contiguous with the Organ Mountains to the south, separated by St. Augustine Pass (elevation 1,717 m (5,633 ft)) and U.S. Highway 70, the two are very distinct geologically and botanically. The Oscura Mountains to the north are separated from the San Andres Mountains by Mockingbird Gap (elevation 1,631 m (5,351 ft)) and the much lower Little Burro Mountains. The San Andres Mountains are comparatively dry and do not support extensive woodlands. They are mostly closed to the public, lying almost entirely within the restricted White Sands Missile Range.

== Geology ==
The San Andres Mountains form part of the eastern edge of the rift valley of the Rio Grande, and are made up of west-dipping fault blocks made primarily of San Andres Formation limestone, but also with extensive exposures of reddish Abo Formation sandstone on the western side, and quartz monzonite on the eastern side. Gypsum deposits washed from these mountains are the main source of the dunes in White Sands National Park.

Significant summits include:

Mountain	Height (ft)	Height (m)	Coordinates	Prominence (ft)
Salinas Peak	8,965	2,733	33.2986°N 106.5315°W	3,625
San Andres Peak	8,235	2,510	32.6760°N 106.5369°W	2,525
Chalk Hills High Point	7,988	2,435	33.1796°N 106.7226°W	1,728
Unnamed Peak	7,646	2,331	32.9045°N 106.5803°W	1,899
Gardner Peak	7,534	2,296	32.8242°N 106.5624°W	2,052
Black Brushy Mountain	7,521	2,292	32.5976°N 106.5189°W	1,701
Capitol Peak	7,098	2,163	33.4068°N 106.4249°W	1,833

== Desert bighorn sheep ==
The biggest and best desert bighorn sheep habitat in New Mexico is in the San Andres Mountains, which can host up to 400 bighorn. An area of 57,215 acres (231.54 km^{2}) in the southern portion of the San Andres Mountain range was set aside in 1941 as the San Andres National Wildlife Refuge to help preserve the desert bighorn sheep, which at the time numbered 33. In the mid-1970s there were around 200 sheep in the refuge; however, in 1979, a scabies mite epizootic reduced the population from 200 to 75. Subsequent years brought further declines from scabies and other causes until the population consisted of one ewe in 1997. Reintroduction of desert bighorn sheep occurred in 2002 and the herd has now about 80 members.
