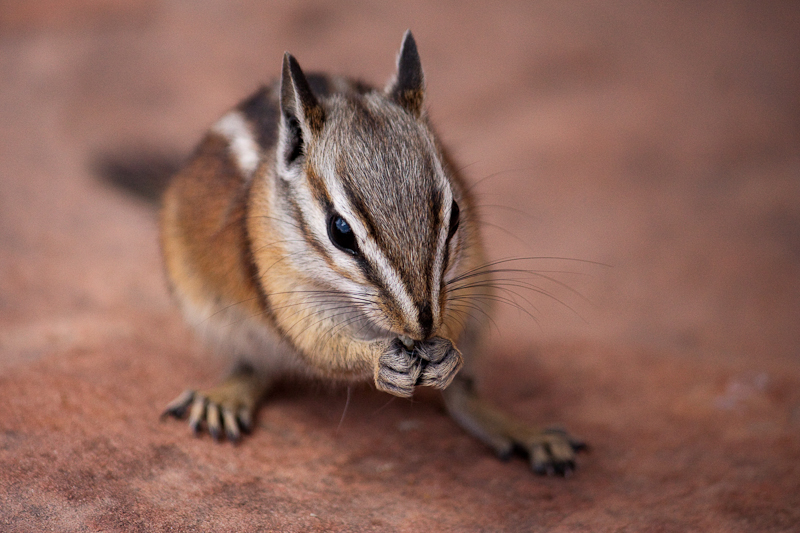

Conservation status
- Least Concern (IUCN 3.1)

Scientific classification
- Kingdom: Animalia
- Phylum: Chordata
- Class: Mammalia
- Order: Rodentia
- Family: Sciuridae
- Genus: Neotamias
- Species: N. umbrinus

Binomial name
- Neotamias umbrinus (J. A. Allen, 1890)

Subspecies
- 7 (see text)

Synonyms
- Tamias umbrinus J. A. Allen, 1890

= Uinta chipmunk =

Species of rodent

The Uinta chipmunk or hidden forest chipmunk (Neotamias umbrinus) is a species of chipmunk in the family Sciuridae. It is endemic to the United States. Formerly known as Tamias umbrinus, phylogenetic studies have shown it to be sufficiently distinct from the eastern chipmunk as to be placed in a separate genus, Neotamias. The same studies have also suggested that Palmer's chipmunk may actually be a subspecies of Uinta chipmunk, although the two are still generally regarded as separate species.

== Description ==
The Uinta chipmunk is a medium-sized chipmunk, with adults ranging from 20 to 24 cm (7.9 to 9.4 in) in length, including the tail at 7 to 11 cm (2.8 to 4.3 in), and weighing an average of 67 g (2.4 oz). The predominant color of the summer coat varies from yellowish brown-grey to dark brown, often with a reddish tinge. Three wide, distinct dark blackish-brown stripes run down the back, separated and surrounded by four paler stripes of pale grey to white fur. Also, three dark and three pale stripes are on each side of the face. In the winter, the coat becomes duller and more greyish, and the stripes become less distinct. The ears are black, and the underparts a very pale grey. The tail has orange and black fur, with a paler fringe of hair on the underside.

== Distribution and habitat ==
The Uinta chipmunk lives in montane and subalpine forests of the western United States, between 1,400 and 3,650 m (4,590 and 11,980 ft) elevation. It is most common at the margins of pine and fir forests, or in clearings, often near rocky terrain or steep slopes. The Uinta chipmunk frequently partitions habitat with other chipmunk species, including the cliff chipmunk and the Colorado chipmunk. In northeastern Colorado, a boundary between Uinta and Colorado chipmunks occurs at approximately 2,100 m (6,900 ft) with Uinta chipmunks found at higher elevations.. It is known to co-occur with the least chipmunk.

Uinta chipmunks do not have a continuous, unbroken range, but are instead found in a number of disjunct localities, perhaps reflecting changing patterns of forest cover during the Pleistocene. Seven subspecies are currently recognized:

- N. u. adsitus – southern Utah and northern Arizona
- N. u. inyoensis – central Nevada and eastern California
- N. u. fremonti – western Wyoming
- N. u. montanus – western Colorado
- N. u. nevadensis – southern Nevada (possibly extinct)
- N. u. sedulus – southeastern Utah
- N. u. umbrinus – northern Utah

== Diet and behavior ==
Uinta chipmunks are herbivorous. Their primary diet consists of the seeds of coniferous trees such as Douglas fir, ponderosa pine, juniper, and spruce, and on the fruit of local shrubs such as wild roses, raspberries, and chokecherries. They also eat some grass and fungi, and may supplement their diet with small quantities of insects or carrion.

The chipmunks are solitary, diurnal, animals, and are aggressive to other members of their own species, each individual defending a territory of 2 to 5 ha (4.9 to 12.4 acres). They establish dens in burrows under rocks, shrubs, or other shelter, or else in natural rock crevices or hollow logs. They spend much of the winter in their dens, but are otherwise highly arboreal, climbing trees to search for food and escape from predators.

The animals have been reported to make a number of different vocalizations, with most common being bursts of sharp "chip" sounds that can continue for up to 15 minutes, and are made from exposed locations, such as rock outcrops or high branches. Other vocalizations include lower-pitched "chuck" sounds, often interspersed with "chips" while fleeing from predators, trills, and squeals. Individuals caught in traps frequently emit chips and trills when approached. Squeals, similar to the distress calls of juveniles, may be produced when the chipmunks are handled. Chucks are predominantly observed at feeding sites.

== Reproduction ==
The breeding season occurs in the spring, roughly from late April to early June, with the exact time depending on the local climate and latitude. The mother gives birth to a single litter of three to five young after a gestation period around 30 days. The young are weaned around 25 days of age, and begin to leave the burrow shortly thereafter. Only 27.5% of Uinta chipmunks survive through the winter, and the maximum life expectancy is believed to be two years.

The baculum of the Uinta chipmunk is notably short and thick, featuring a wide base. A distinctive characteristic is its bend at the midpoint. The tip of the baculum constitutes 36–50% of the total length of the shaft and is angled dorsally between 90 and 100 degrees. The dorsal surface of the tip has a low keel, approximately 25% of its length, while the distal half of the shaft is laterally compressed. Although variation in baculum morphology among Uinta chipmunks is generally minimal, some individuals may display a smaller, S-shaped baculum.

The baubellum is characterized by its U-shape. The proximal end directs caudally, with the shaft running parallel to the body and pointing posteriorly. The distal tip angles ventrally (to the right) at approximately 30 degrees. The base of the baubellum is long and straight, featuring a deep notch between two knobs at its proximal end. The shaft is straight and laterally flattened, often presenting a tubercle (heel) at the junction of the tip and shaft. The angle between the base and the shaft is about 80 degrees. Notably, the tip is slightly longer than the shaft and includes a keel on its ventral surface, with the opposite side being slightly concave and lateral flanges present.

== Molting ==
Uinta chipmunks undergo two molts each year, with distinct seasonal changes in their pelage. The first molt occurs between May and August, transitioning from winter to summer fur. The second molt, from summer to winter pelage, takes place from September to November. The timing of these molts can vary based on sex, location, and reproductive status. Males generally molt prior to females, while pregnant and lactating females often retain their winter pelage throughout the summer months. These females typically undergo their molt in late summer or early autumn, coinciding with the weaning of their young. The summer molt begins at the nose or head and progresses toward the posterior, usually exhibiting a distinct molt line. In contrast, the winter molt initiates at the rump and moves forward, often lacking a clear molt line. Summer fur is characterized by being short, coarse, and brightly colored, while winter fur is soft, silky, and generally duller in hue. Additionally, winter pelage features longer guard hairs, providing enhanced insulation during colder months.
