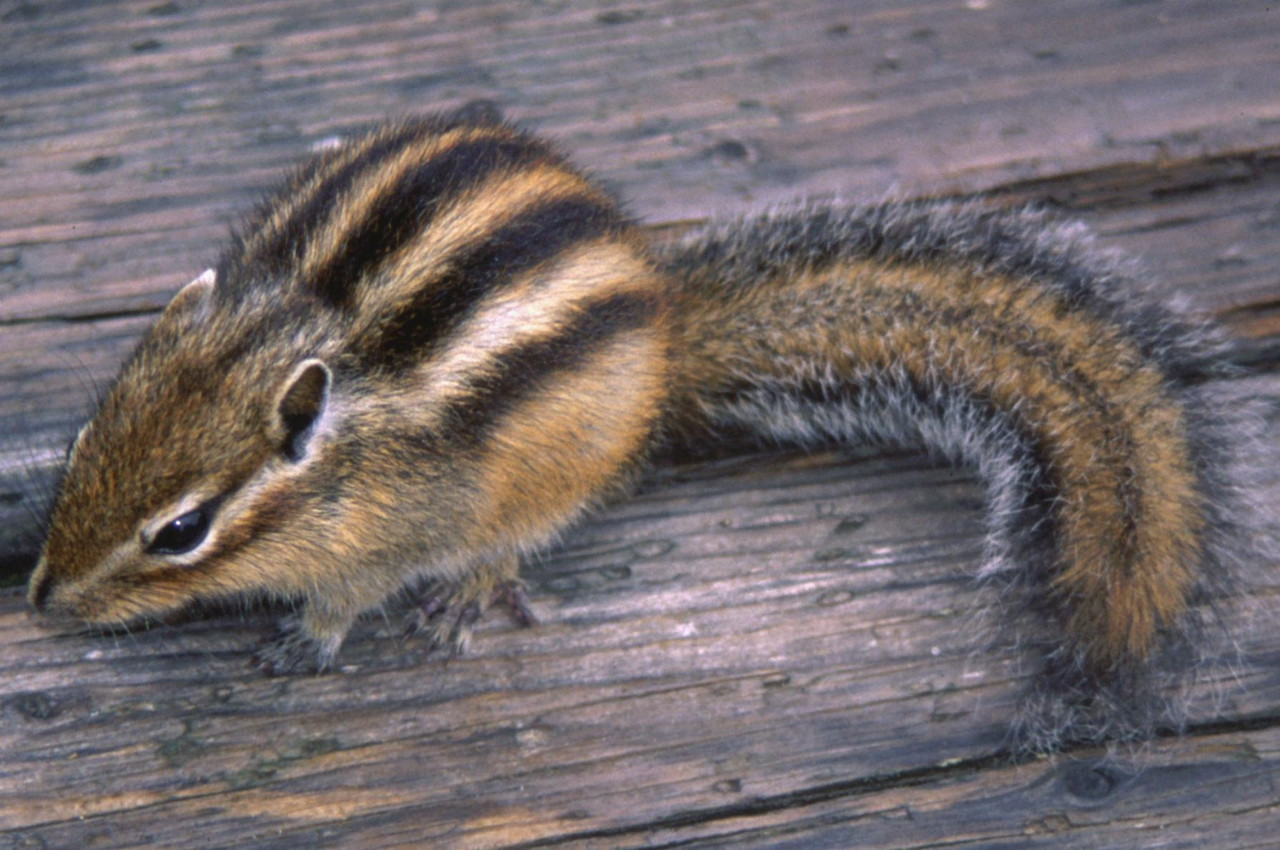
- On Mount Daisetsu (November 2001)

Scientific classification
- Kingdom: Animalia
- Phylum: Chordata
- Class: Mammalia
- Order: Rodentia
- Family: Sciuridae
- Genus: Eutamias
- Species: E. sibiricus
- Subspecies: E. s. lineatus

Trinomial name
- Eutamias sibiricus lineatus (Siebold, 1824)

Synonyms
- Myoxus lineatus Siebold, 1824; Tamias lineatus Thomas, 1907; Tamias sibiricus lineatus Tamias (Eutamias) sibiricus lineatus

= Ezo chipmunk =

Subspecies of mammal

The Ezo chipmunk is a subspecies or local population of the Siberian chipmunk; it is found in what was once known as Ezo, namely Hokkaidō, Japan, and Sakhalin and the Southern Kuriles, Russia.

== Taxonomy ==
The Ezo chipmunk was first described by Philipp Franz von Siebold in 1824, shortly after his arrival in Japan: "Myoxus lineatus, its back marked and distinguished with five stripes, verging on black, that run the length of its body, lives on the island of Ezo; body 6½ inches, tail 4½ inches." (Note: M. lineatus tergo lineis quinque longitudinalibus nigrescentibus notato, habitat in insula Jezo. Longitudo corporis 6½ poll. caudae 4½ poll.) As such, the type specimens are credited by Oldfield Thomas in his series of papers on the Duke of Bedford's "zoological exploration" of east Asia as "representing the first mammal ever described from Japan".

Thomas transferred the taxon from the Linnaean genus Myoxus to Tamias and cited a need for comparison with "more Siberian material" to determine its specific or subspecific status. Subsequently recognized as a subspecies of the Siberian chipmunk Tamias sibiricus, first described (as Sciurus sibiricus) by explorer Erich Gustav Laxmann in 1769, Tamias (Eutamias) sibiricus lineatus is included in Mammal Species of the World as one of nine subspecies of Tamias (Eutamias) sibiricus. The same nine subspecies are listed in the 2016 Handbook of the Mammals of the World, but in the ensuing 2020 Illustrated Checklist of the Mammals of the World, the former subgenus Eutamias is promoted to the genus Eutamias, with one extant species (the Siberian chipmunk), and only three subspecies recognized (E. s. sibiricus, E. s. barberi, and E. s. senescens), the Ezo chipmunk as subspecies synonymized into E. s. sibiricus. This treatment is largely based on genetics, though morphological characteristics also helped drive the promotion to generic status of Eutamias Trouessart, 1880 and Neotamias Howell, 1929, alongside Tamias Illiger, 1811, within the tribe Marmotini.

== Vernacular names ==
In Japanese the Ezo chipmunk is called エゾシマリス (ezo shima risu), and, in the Ainu language, エペシロ (epeshiro).

== Distribution ==
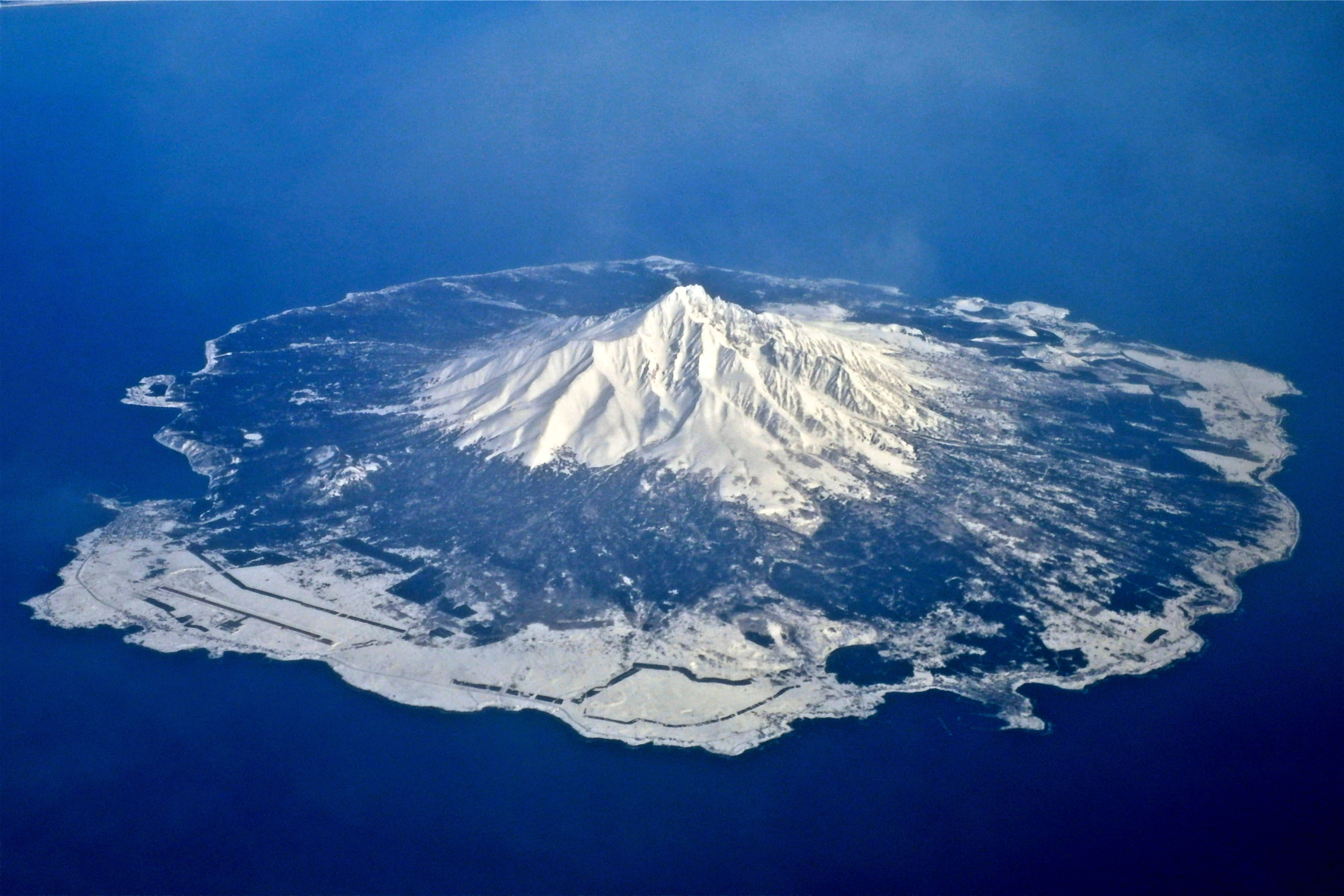
Rishiri, one of the islands where Eutamias sibiricus lineatus is found; cf. Rishiri-Rebun-Sarobetsu National Park

According to the explanatory materials accompanying the 2010 Ministry of the Environment Red List, Eutamias sibiricus lineatus is found on Hokkaidō and the neighbouring islands of Rebun, Rishiri, Teuri, and Yagishiri, as well as on Sakhalin, Etorofu, and Kunashiri; however, it is noted that a full distribution survey has not been conducted on Hokkaidō itself and that due to the unknown consequences of the introduction of continental conspecifics (especially E. s. barberi, as pets—as well as those intentionally released in Hokkaido University Botanical Gardens) in terms of competition and crossbreeding with the native subspecies, the population and precise distribution of the Ezo chipmunk is unknown; as such, the conservation status of Eutamias sibiricus lineatus on the 2020 Japanese Red List is Data Deficient.

== Physical description ==
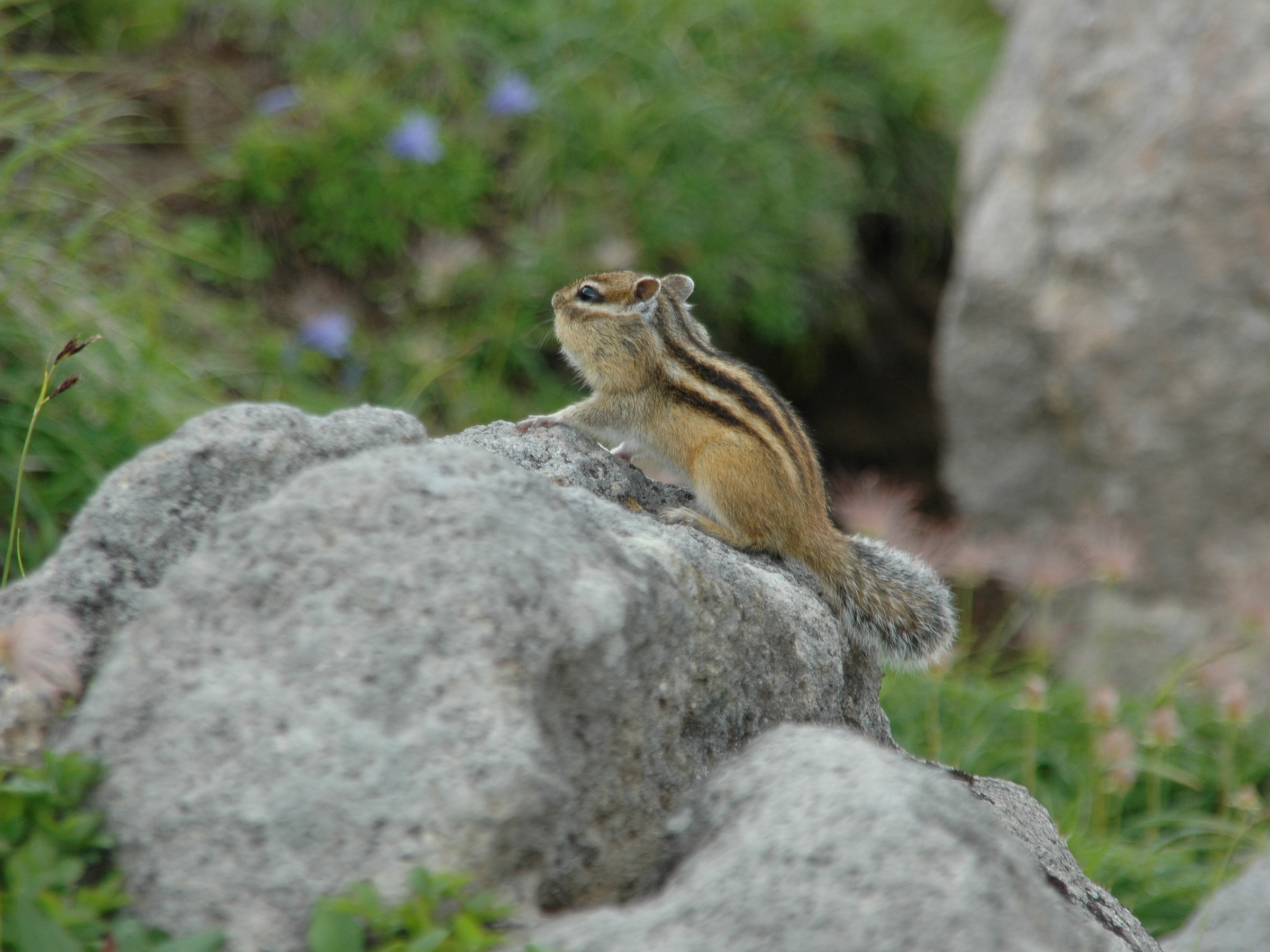
On Mount Aka (August 2006)

Eutamias sibiricus lineatus measures 12–15 centimetres (4.7–5.9 in) from the tip of its nose to the base of its tail, which extends a further 11–12 centimetres (4.3–4.7 in), and weighs 71–116 grams (2.5–4.1 oz). Its fur is a pale brown, with five blackish stripes running the length of its back, with white in the gaps between and on its underparts. Compared with other Siberian chipmunks, where the nominate subspecies E. s. sibiricus is "darker and less brightly coloured", and E. s. orientalis (found in Korea, northwest China and adjoining areas of Siberia) "brighter and ruddier", E. s. lineatus is "more pale on hips and top of head" than E. s. orientalis.

== Behaviour and ecology ==
=== Habitat ===
The Ezo chipmunk inhabits forested areas from the plains to high mountains (up to an altitude of c. 2,000 metres (6,600 ft)). Though spending much of its time at ground level, it is also proficient at climbing trees, using its tail for balance. In coastal areas, the constituents of its diet may be markedly different from that of Ezo chipmunks in the highland zone of Daisetsuzan.

=== Diet and predation ===
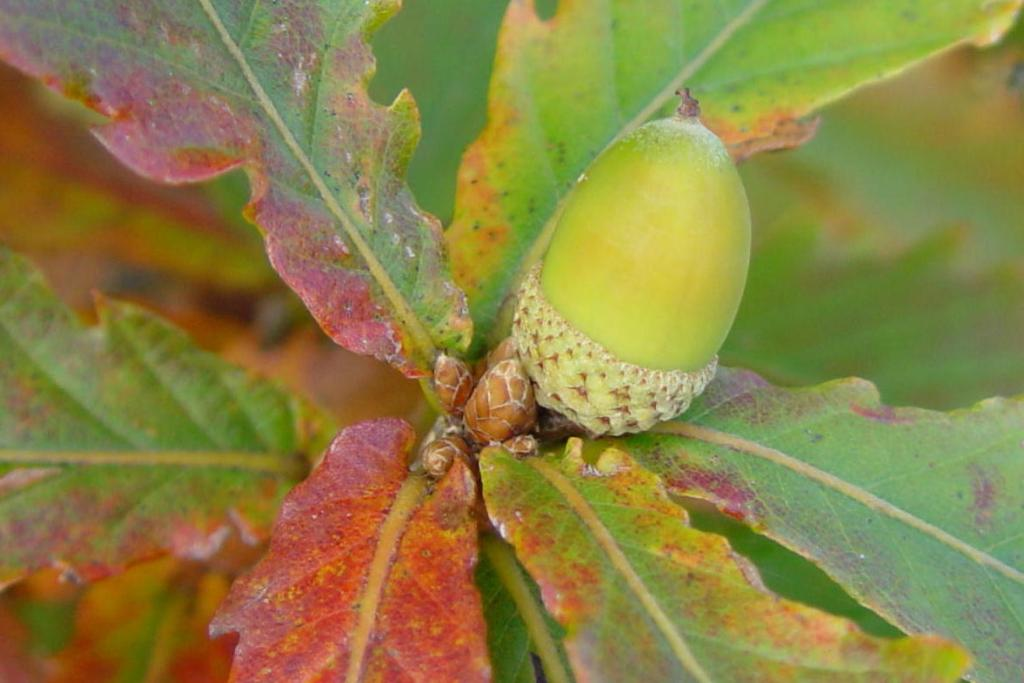
The Ezo chipmunk can carry as many as six Mongolian oak acorns in its cheek pouches at any one time.

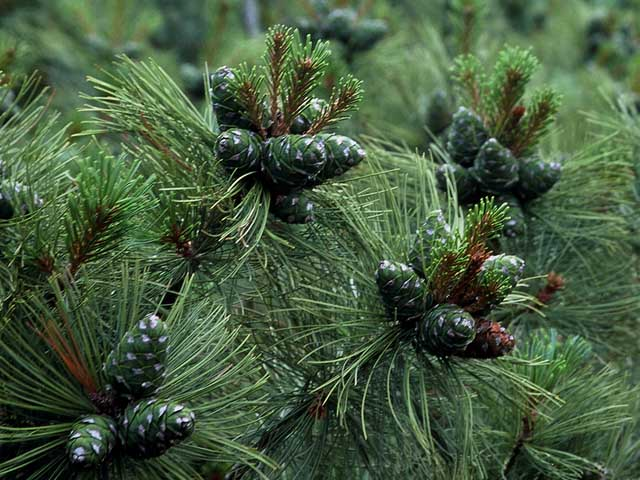
Japanese stone pine cones form part of the diet of the Ezo chipmunk.

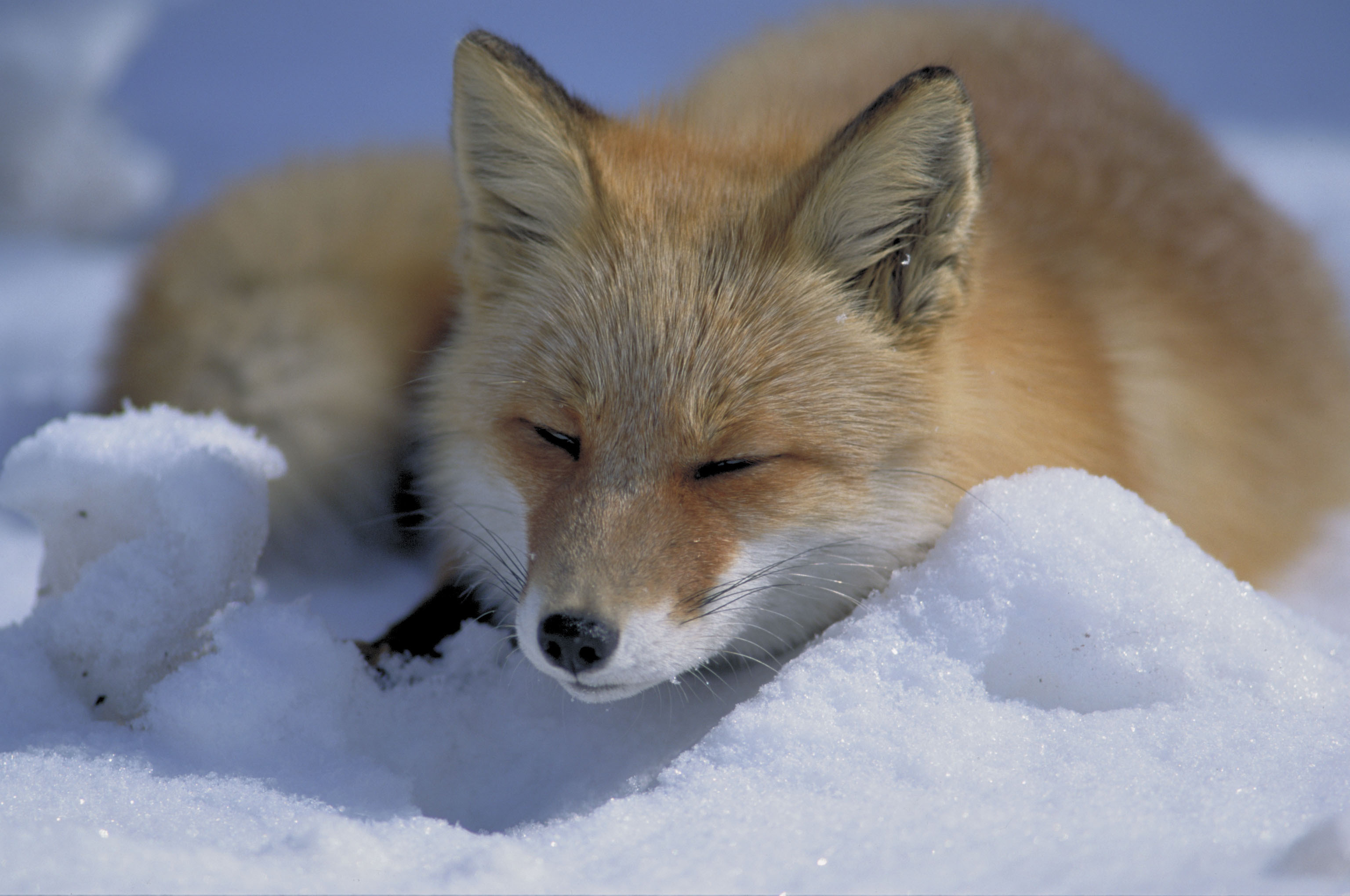
The Ezo chipmunk forms part of the diet of the Ezo red fox.

Omnivorous, the diet of the Ezo chipmunk includes the seeds, fruit, flowers, shoots, leaves, and sap of over thirty-five species of trees and grasses, insects, snails, and the eggs of small birds; in particular, changing with the seasons, in early spring, sasa shoots and young maple leaves, and as these grow and become tougher, the seeds, cones, and nuts of sedge, Japanese stone pine, and Japanese rowan, various types of cherry, as well as Mongolian oak acorns. It can carry up to three of these acorns in each of its left and right cheek pouches: rather than eating them on the spot, it retires to a safe place, or buries them in a decentralized, distributed system (sometimes chanced upon by an Ezo squirrel or mouse) of freshly excavated shallow holes for later retrieval. Travelling on average up to 300 metres (980 ft) in its search for food, this species is largely vegetarian. However, this diet is supplemented, particularly while young chipmunks are being reared, with spiders, cicadas, snails, stag beetles, ant pupae, moth larvae, Japanese tit eggs, sometimes even young chicks of the long-tailed tit. This chipmunk does not eat mushrooms.

In turn, the Ezo chipmunk is preyed upon by the Ezo red fox, Ezo stoat, Ezo sable, Japanese weasel, least weasel, Japanese striped snake, owls, and other birds of prey. Since any buried acorns it does not retrieve and eat themselves may start to grow in the following spring, the Ezo chipmunk also plays a role in forest regeneration.

=== Hibernation ===
The Ezo chipmunk spends five to seven months each year in isolation and the dark, in hibernation in its underground nest in the middle of the forest; adult females average 211 days in hibernation, adult males 180 days, young females 194 days, and young males 169 days. Both males and females move to a new burrow each year, though with an array of available old burrows, they may decide to renovate and occupy one of these, females relocating on average 30 metres (98 ft) and males 44 metres (144 ft). Prior to hibernation, unlike bears and bats, which build up significant fat reserves, the Ezo chipmunk concentrates on stockpiling; leaving aside fruit and animal matter, which quickly decay, come mid-September, having determined its burrow for the winter, it is particularly active in gathering the browning acorns of the Mongolian oak, returning with up to forty loads and a hundred-and-seventy acorns a day, they accumulate on average a store of some 1,192 grams (42.0 oz) of foodstuffs (though, due to the length of the period of hibernation, this only equates to c. 6 grams (0.21 oz) a day).

The excavated burrow includes a tunnel that may extend some 180 centimetres (71 in), a chamber for sleeping with a bed of leaves, paired storage spaces for food, and a toilet area. When finally entering its burrow, it blocks up the entrance with earth from inside. While timing depends on the individual, on average mature females enter hibernation when the temperature drops to 7 °C (45 °F), mature males and young females 4 °C (39 °F), and young males 0 °C (32 °F). While hibernating, the pulse and respiratory pulse rate slows (the latter by 50%–75%), and body temperature drops (to some 2.8–8 °C (37.0–46.4 °F)), increasing again every ten days for a short spell of activity when it briefly awakens, eats, and visits its toilet area. At the end of the period of hibernation, a new exit is formed, averaging some 2 metres (6 ft 7 in) from the original entrance. In years of early thaw, hibernation similarly ends early. The success of Ezo chipmunk hibernation is attested to by the relatively low mortality rate, below 5%.

=== Reproduction ===
That males enter hibernatation later and emerge from it earlier has been interpreted as a reproductive strategy, so that they might better know the whereabouts of receptive females in its range (in autumn, as much as 3,900 square metres (42,000 sq ft) for females, 6,800 square metres (73,000 sq ft) for males) when the time comes. (The range of a male may overlap with that of four to ten females.) The female typically goes into estrous three days after her finally awakening from hibernation. After an intense single day of mating, in late April or early May, the female calling "koro-koro" to attract nearby males ("po po po" sounds may also be observed at this time), and a 30-day gestation period, some three to seven young are born, in approximately half of instances, the female choosing the same burrow for parturition as she previously used for hibernation. With young being nursed for a further sixty days, there is only the opportunity for one litter each year. Weighing some 3–4 grams (0.11–0.14 oz) at birth, their black stripes begin to show after a few days, their fur beginning to grow shortly thereafter. At this stage, the mother returns to the burrow three to five times a day for feeding (with milk), such visits lasting on average one-and-a-half hours; she also stays the night with her young. Some four weeks after birth, their eyes open, at which point they begin to explore their tunnel, sometimes also poking their heads out of the entrance. A week or so later, they venture out for the first time, accompanied by their mother, and from this point she moves to a different burrow at night, still visiting that of her young some four to eight times a day for feeding, with milk and other foodstuffs. After some sixty days she stops visiting, leaving her young to fend for themselves; by this time, it is August.

=== Lifespan ===
In captivity, the Ezo chipmunk can live for up to nine years, while in the wild the upper limit is typically five for males and six for females. However, around half of all males and females perish each year going about their daily activities between spring and autumn.

== See also ==
- List of mammals in Japan
- Japanese Red List
- Adam Laxman (son of Erich Laxmann)
