= Nototamias =

Scientific classification
- Domain: Eukaryota
- Kingdom: Animalia
- Phylum: Chordata
- Class: Mammalia
- Order: Rodentia
- Family: Sciuridae
- Tribe: Marmotini
- Subtribe: Tamiina
- Genus: †Nototamias; Pratt and Morgan, 1989

Type species
- †Nototamias hulberti Pratt and Morgan, 1989

Species
- See text

Extinct genus of rodents

Nototamias is a genus of fossil ground squirrels from the Miocene of North America. Species include Nototamias hulberti Pratt and Morgan, 1989; Nototamias ateles (Hall, 1930); and Nototamias complicatus Korth, 1992. Although the genus, characterized by fused roots on the lower cheekteeth, is often regarded as closely related to the chipmunks, and N. ateles has even been regarded as a species of Tamias, evidence for this relationship is poor and Nototamias may instead be near the origin of the Marmotini.

== Literature cited ==
- Goodwin, H.T. 2008. Sciuridae. Pp. 255–376 in Janis, C.M., Gunnell, G.F. and Uhen, M.D. (eds.). Evolution of Tertiary Mammals of North America. Volume 2: Small Mammals, Xenarthrans, and Marine Mammals. Cambridge University Press, 802 pp. ISBN 978-0-521-78117-6
