= Tamias aristus =

Tamias aristus Temporal range: Pleistocene

Scientific classification
- Kingdom: Animalia
- Phylum: Chordata
- Class: Mammalia
- Order: Rodentia
- Family: Sciuridae
- Genus: Tamias
- Species: †T. aristus

Binomial name
- †Tamias aristus Ray, 1965

Extinct species of rodent

Tamias aristus is an extinct species of chipmunk that lived during the late Pleistocene epoch. It was characterized from a fossilized skull found in a limestone quarry in Ladds, Bartow County, Georgia. The name is derived from the Greek aristos, meaning noblest.

The fossil closely resembles the skull of Tamias striatus, but all dimensions of the T. aristus skull are consistently 10-30% larger than the largest examples of T. striatus. While it is suspected the two species are closely related, their relationship is unclear as T. striatus fossils have been found in the same fossil assemblage and poor stratigraphic control in the area makes temporal relationships hard to identify.

== See also ==
- Paleontology in Georgia
