= Tamias anatoliensis =

Tamias anatoliensis Temporal range: Late Miocene

Scientific classification
- Kingdom: Animalia
- Phylum: Chordata
- Class: Mammalia
- Infraclass: Placentalia
- Order: Rodentia
- Family: Sciuridae
- Genus: Tamias
- Species: †T. anatoliensis

Binomial name
- †Tamias anatoliensis Bosma et al., 2013

Species of mammal

Tamias anatoliensis is an extinct species of Tamias that lived during the Late Miocene.

== Distribution ==
Fossils of T. anatoliensis are known from Turkey.
