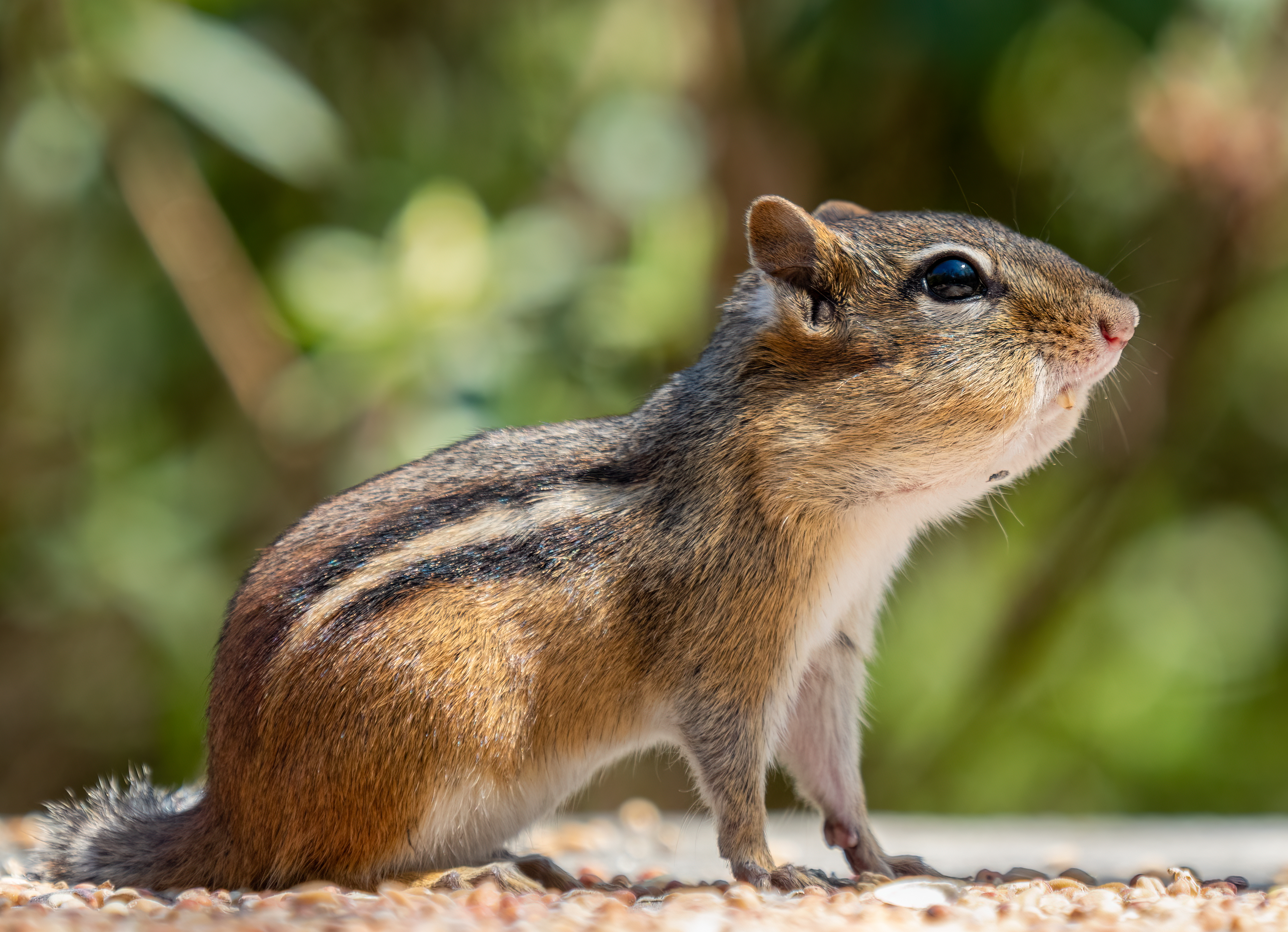
- Eastern chipmunk (Tamias striatus)

Scientific classification
- Kingdom: Animalia
- Phylum: Chordata
- Class: Mammalia
- Order: Rodentia
- Family: Sciuridae
- Tribe: Marmotini
- Subtribe: Tamiina; Moore, 1959

Genera
- Eutamias; Neotamias; †Nototamias; Tamias

= Chipmunk =

Chipmunks Temporal range: Early Miocene to Recent

Subtribe of mammals

Chipmunks are small, striped burrowing squirrels of subtribe Tamiina. Chipmunks are found in North America, with the exception of the Siberian chipmunk, which is found primarily in Asia. The name "chipmunk" originated in the 19th century, and other names for this group of squirrels include chitmunk, chipmuck, chipping squirrel, and ground squirrel, though the last name can refer to squirrels of other genera.

Chipmunks are omnivorous animals, and have diets that primarily include seeds, nuts, fruits and buds but may extend to include other plant matter, fungi, insects, small frogs, worms, bird eggs and nestlings. Their varied diet allows them to feed on plants such as grains and vegetables grown by humans, which has led them to be considered pests in some areas. Many species of chipmunk will commonly carry food items in their cheek pouches back to their burrows to eat or store for winter, and this seed storing behavior contributes to the dispersal and establishment of seedlings and fungi in forests.

== Taxonomy and systematics ==
Chipmunks are classified as four genera: Tamias, of which the eastern chipmunk (T. striatus) is the only living member; Eutamias, of which the Siberian chipmunk (E. sibiricus) is the only living member; Nototamias, which consists of three extinct species, and Neotamias, which includes the 23 remaining, mostly western North American, species. These classifications were treated as subgenera due to the chipmunks' morphological similarities. As a result, most taxonomies over the twentieth century have placed the chipmunks into a single genus. Joseph C. Moore reclassified chipmunks to form the subtribe Tamiina within the tribe Marmotini in a 1959 study, and this classification of three living genera of chipmunks rather than a single chipmunk genus has been supported by studies of mitochondrial DNA performed from 2000 to 2010.

The common name originally may have been spelled "chitmunk", from the native Odawa (Ottawa) word jidmoonh, meaning "red squirrel" (cf. Ojibwe ᐊᒋᑕᒨ ajidamoo). The earliest form cited in the Oxford English Dictionary is "chipmonk", from 1842. Other early forms include "chipmuck" and "chipminck", and in the 1830s they were also referred to as "chip squirrels", probably in reference to the sound they make. In the mid-19th century, John James Audubon and his sons included a lithograph of the chipmunk in their Viviparous Quadrupeds of North America, calling it the "chipping squirrel [or] hackee". Chipmunks have also been referred to as ground squirrels (although the name "ground squirrel" may refer to other squirrels, such as those of the genus Spermophilus).

== Diet ==
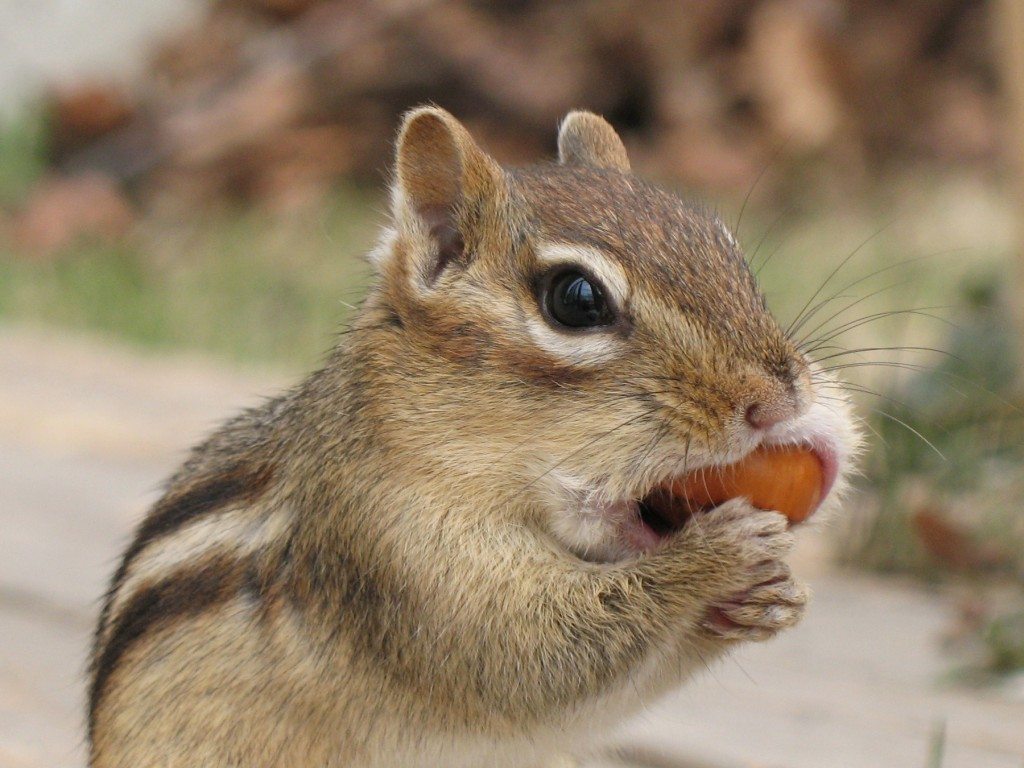
An eastern chipmunk placing food in its cheek pouch

Chipmunks have an omnivorous diet primarily consisting of seeds, nuts and other fruits, and buds. They also commonly eat grass, shoots, and many other forms of plant matter, as well as fungi, insects and other arthropods, small frogs, worms, and bird eggs. They will also occasionally eat newly hatched baby birds. Around humans, chipmunks can eat cultivated grains and vegetables, and other plants from farms and gardens, so they are sometimes considered pests. Chipmunks mostly forage on the ground, but they climb trees to obtain nuts such as hazelnuts and acorns. At the beginning of autumn, many species of chipmunk begin to stockpile nonperishable foods for winter. They mostly cache their foods in a larder in their burrows and remain in their nests until spring, unlike some other species which make multiple small caches of food. Cheek pouches allow chipmunks to carry food items to their burrows for either storage or consumption.

== Ecology and life history ==
Chipmunks in northern Wisconsin

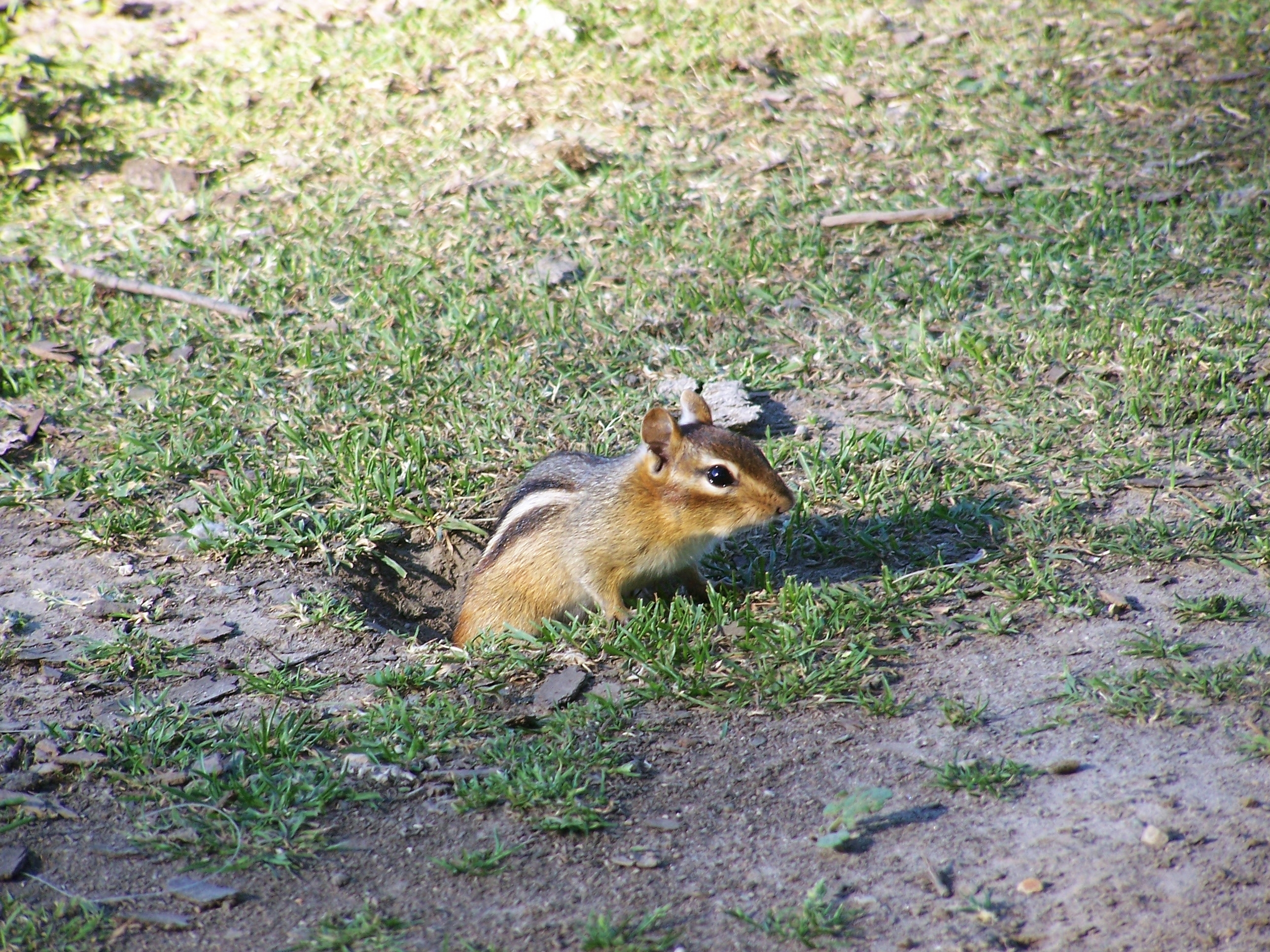
Eastern chipmunk at the entrance of its burrow

Eastern chipmunks, the largest of the chipmunks, mate in early spring and again in early summer, producing litters of four or five young twice each year. Western chipmunks breed only once a year. The young emerge from the burrow after about six weeks and strike out on their own within the next two weeks.

These small mammals fulfill several important functions in forest ecosystems. Their activities harvesting and hoarding tree seeds play a crucial role in seedling establishment. They consume many different kinds of fungi, including those involved in symbiotic mycorrhizal associations with trees, and are a vector for dispersal of the spores of subterranean sporocarps (truffles) in some regions. Movement or storage of seeds in soil caused by chipmunks leads to the germination of new plants.

Chipmunks construct extensive burrows which can be more than 3.5 m (11 ft) in length with several well-concealed entrances. The burrows are complex and include plugged entryways, separate compartments for nesting, multiple food chambers, side pockets and escape routes. The sleeping quarters are kept clear of shells, and feces are stored in refuse tunnels. They are diurnal. The eastern chipmunk hibernates in the winter, while western chipmunks do not, relying on the stores in their burrows. Chipmunks play an important role as prey for various predatory mammals and birds, but are also opportunistic predators themselves. This is particularly the case with regard to bird eggs and nestlings, as in the case of eastern chipmunks and mountain bluebirds.

Chipmunks typically live about three years, although some have been observed living to nine years in captivity. In captivity, they are said to sleep for an average of about 15 hours a day. It is thought that mammals which can sleep in hiding, such as rodents and bats, tend to sleep longer than those that must remain on alert.

== Genera ==
Genus Eutamias

- Siberian chipmunk, Eutamias sibiricus

Genus Tamias

- Eastern chipmunk, Tamias striatus
- Tamias aristus †

Genus Neotamias

- Allen's chipmunk, Neotamias senex
- Alpine chipmunk, Neotamias alpinus
- Buller's chipmunk, Neotamias bulleri
- California chipmunk, Neotamias obscurus
- Cliff chipmunk, Neotamias dorsalis
- Colorado chipmunk, Neotamias quadrivittatus
- Durango chipmunk, Neotamias durangae
- Gray-collared chipmunk, Neotamias cinereicollis
- Gray-footed chipmunk, Neotamias canipes
- Hopi chipmunk, Neotamias rufus
- Least chipmunk, Neotamias minimus
- Lodgepole chipmunk, Neotamias speciosus
- Long-eared chipmunk, Neotamias quadrimaculatus
- Merriam's chipmunk, Neotamias merriami
- Palmer's chipmunk, Neotamias palmeri
- Panamint chipmunk, Neotamias panamintinus
- Red-tailed chipmunk, Neotamias ruficaudus
- Siskiyou chipmunk, Neotamias siskiyou
- Sonoma chipmunk, Neotamias sonomae
- Townsend's chipmunk, Neotamias townsendii
- Uinta chipmunk, Neotamias umbrinus
- Yellow-cheeked chipmunk, Neotamias ochrogenys
- Yellow-pine chipmunk, Neotamias amoenus

Genus Nototamias †

- Nototamias ateles †
- Nototamias hulberti †
- Nototamias quadratus †

== In popular culture ==
- Alvin and the Chipmunks, an animated virtual band
- Chip 'n' Dale, cartoon Disney chipmunks
