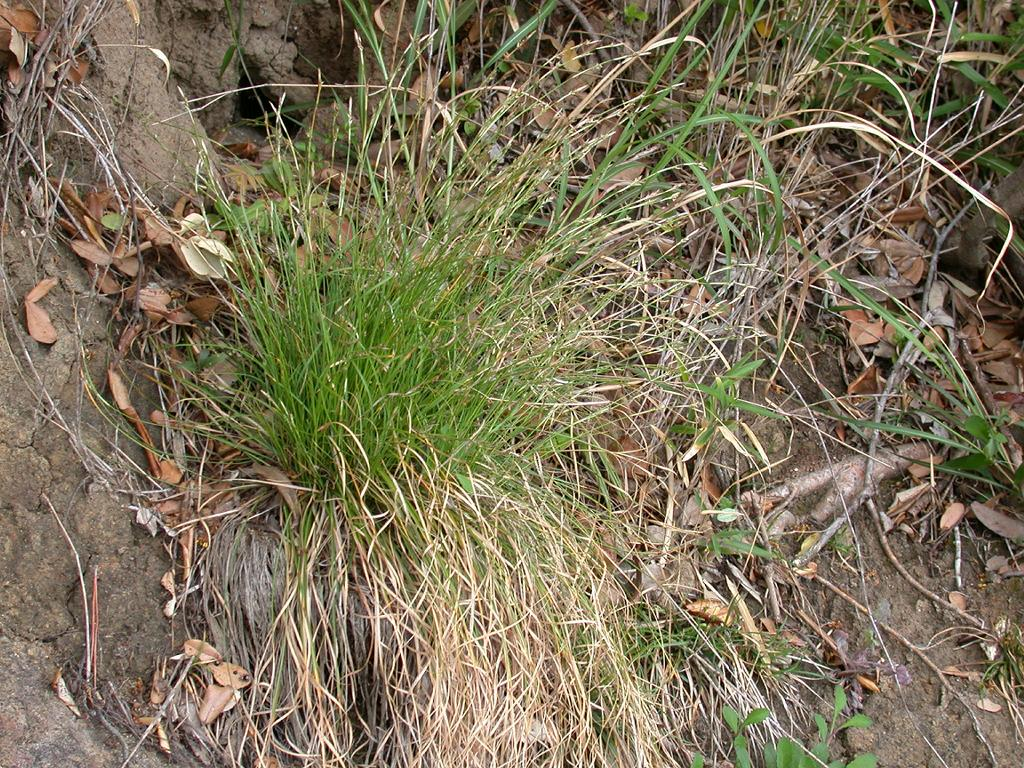
- Habit

Scientific classification
- Kingdom: Plantae
- Clade: Tracheophytes
- Clade: Angiosperms
- Clade: Monocots
- Clade: Commelinids
- Order: Poales
- Family: Cyperaceae
- Genus: Carex
- Species: C. lanceolata

Binomial name
- Carex lanceolata Boott

Synonyms
- List: Carex charkeviczii A.E.Kozhevn.; Carex delicatula C.B.Clarke; Carex foliabunda A.E.Kozhevn.; Carex karafutoana Ohwi; Carex lanceolata var. pseudolanceolata (V.I.Krecz.) Vorosch.; Carex lancibracteata A.E.Kozhevn.; Carex longisquamata Meinsh. ex Kom.; Carex neokukenthaliana H.Lév. & Vaniot; Carex neosachalinensis A.E.Kozhevn.; Carex paucimascula H.Lév. & Vaniot; Carex prevernalis Kitag.; Carex pseudolanceolata V.I.Krecz.; Carex subpediformis (Kük.) Sutô & Suzuki; Carex vorobjevii A.E.Kozhevn.; Carex yesoensis Koidz.

= Carex lanceolata =

Species of flowering plant

Carex lanceolata is a species of sedge (genus Carex), native to the eastern half of China, Mongolia, eastern Siberia, Korea, Sakhalin, and Japan. Its seeds are dispersed by ants.

== Subtaxa ==
The following subspecies are currently accepted:

- Carex lanceolata var. lanceolata
- Carex lanceolata var. laxa Ohwi
- Carex lanceolata var. subpediformis Kük.
