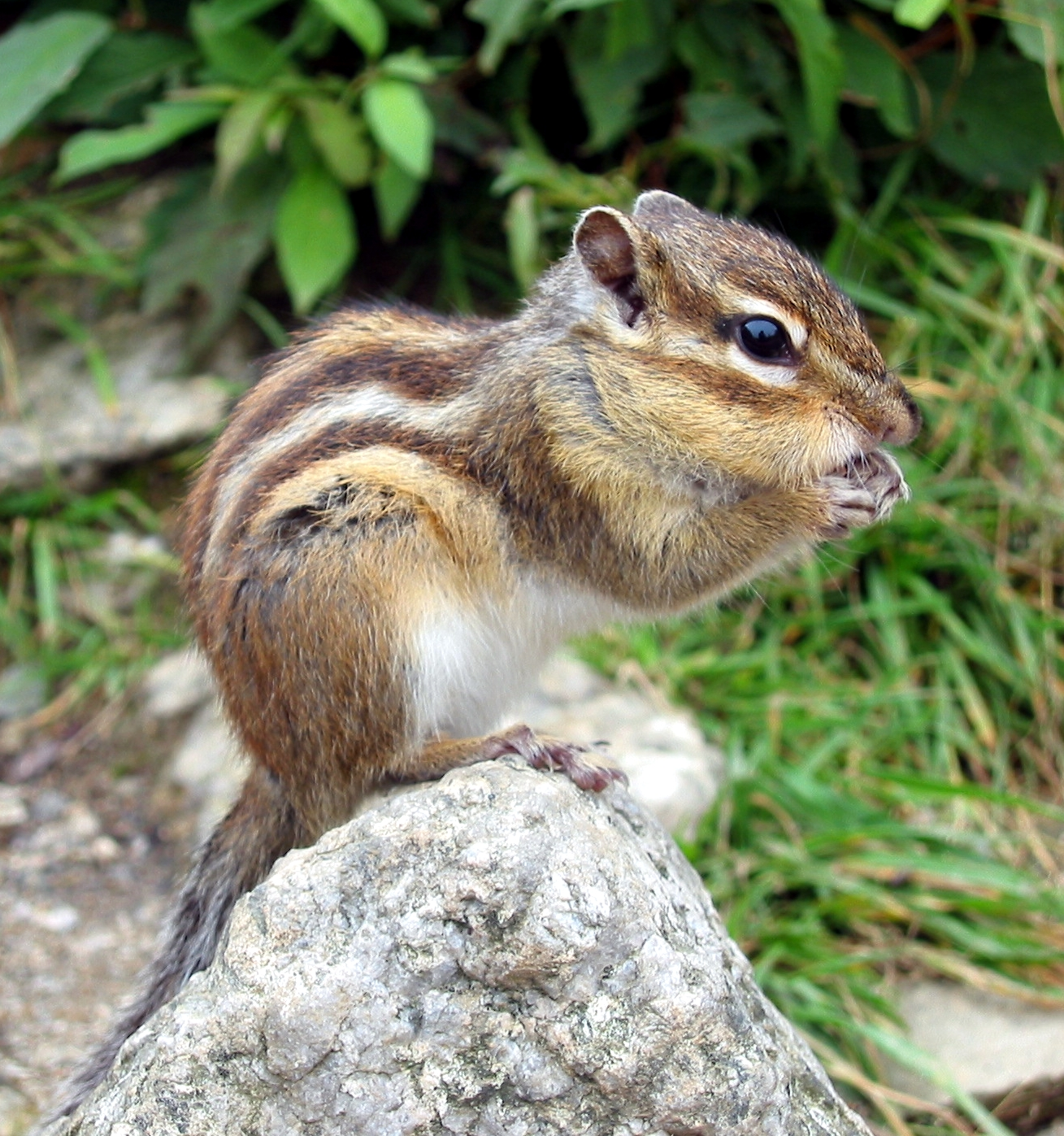
- Siberian chipmunk (Eutamias sibiricus)

Scientific classification
- Domain: Eukaryota
- Kingdom: Animalia
- Phylum: Chordata
- Class: Mammalia
- Order: Rodentia
- Family: Sciuridae
- Subtribe: Tamiina
- Genus: Eutamias; Trouessart, 1880

Type species
- Sciurus striatus asiaticus Gmelin, 1788 (= Sciurus sibiricus Laxmann, 1769)

Species
- See text.

= Eutamias =

Eutamias Temporal range: Early Miocene to present

Genus of rodents

Eutamias is a genus of chipmunks within the tribe Marmotini of the squirrel family. It includes a single living species, the Siberian chipmunk (Eutamias sibiricus). The genus is often treated as a subgenus of Tamias, which is now restricted to the eastern chipmunk of North America. Neotamias, which now includes the western North American chipmunks, has also been included in Eutamias.

In addition to the Siberian chipmunk, several fossil species have been assigned to this genus:

- †Eutamias ertemtensis Qiu, 1991 – late Miocene to Pliocene of China
- †Eutamias lishanensis Qiu et al., 2008 – late Miocene of China
- †Eutamias orlovi Sulimski, 1964 – Pliocene of Poland and Bulgaria
- †Eutamias sihongensis Qiu and Long, 1986 – early Miocene of China; subsequently made the type species of a separate genus Heterotamias.
- †Eutamias wimani (Young, 1927) – Pleistocene of China

== Literature cited ==
- Bruijn H. de. 1995. Sciuridae, Petauristidae and Eomyidae (Rodentia, Mammalia). Münchner Geowissenschaftliche Abhandlungen (A)28:87–102.
- Doukas, C. 2003. The MN4 faunas of Aliveri and Karydia (Greece). Coloquios de Paleontología, Vol. Ext. 1:127–132.
- Mein, P. and Ginsburg, L. 2002. Sur l'âge relatif des différents dépôts karstiques miocènes de La Grive-Saint-Alban (Isère). Cahiers scientifiques, Muséum d’histoire naturelle de Lyon 2:7–47.
- Musser, G.G., Durden, L.A., Holden, M.E. and Light, J.E. 2010. Systematic review of endemic Sulawesi squirrels (Rodentia, Sciuridae), with descriptions of new species of associated sucking lice (Insecta, Anoplura), and phylogenetic and zoogeographic assessments of sciurid lice. Bulletin of the American Museum of Natural History 339:1–260.
- Piaggio, A. J. and Spicer, G. S. 2001. Molecular phylogeny of the chipmunks inferred from mitochondrial cytochrome b and cytochrome oxidase II gene sequences. Molecular Phylogenetics and Evolution 20:335-350.
- Popov V.V. 2004. Pliocene small mammals (Mammalia, Lipotyphla, Chiroptera, Lagomorpha, Rodentia) from Muselievo (North Bulgaria). Geodiversitas 26(3):403–491.
- Qiu, Z. and Storch, G. 2000. The early Pliocene micromammalian fauna of Bilike, Inner Mongolia, China (Mammalia: Lipotyphla, Chiroptera, Rodentia, Lagomorpha). Senckenbergiana Lethaea 80(1):173–229.
- Qiu Z.-D., Zheng S.-H. and Zhang Z.-Q. 2008. Sciurids and zapodids from the late Miocene Bahe Formation, Lantian, Shaanxi. Vertebrata PalAsiatica 46(2):111–123.
- Sulimski, A. 1964. Pliocene Lagomorpha and Rodentia from Węże 1 (Poland). Acta Palaeontologica Polonica 9:149–244.
- Tyutkova, L.A. 2008. The Middle Miocene rodents of the Ashut locality (Turgay Depression). New Mexico Museum of Natural History and Science Bulletin 44:437–442.
- Wang X.-M., Qiu Z.-D., Li Q., Tomida, Y., Kimura, Y., Tseng, Z.J. and Wang H.J. 2004. A new Early to Late Miocene fossiliferous region in central Nei Mongol: Lithostratigraphy and biostratigraphy in Aoerban strata. Vertebrata PalAsiatica 47(2):111–134.
