= Cheek pouch =

Pockets on both sides of the head of some mammals

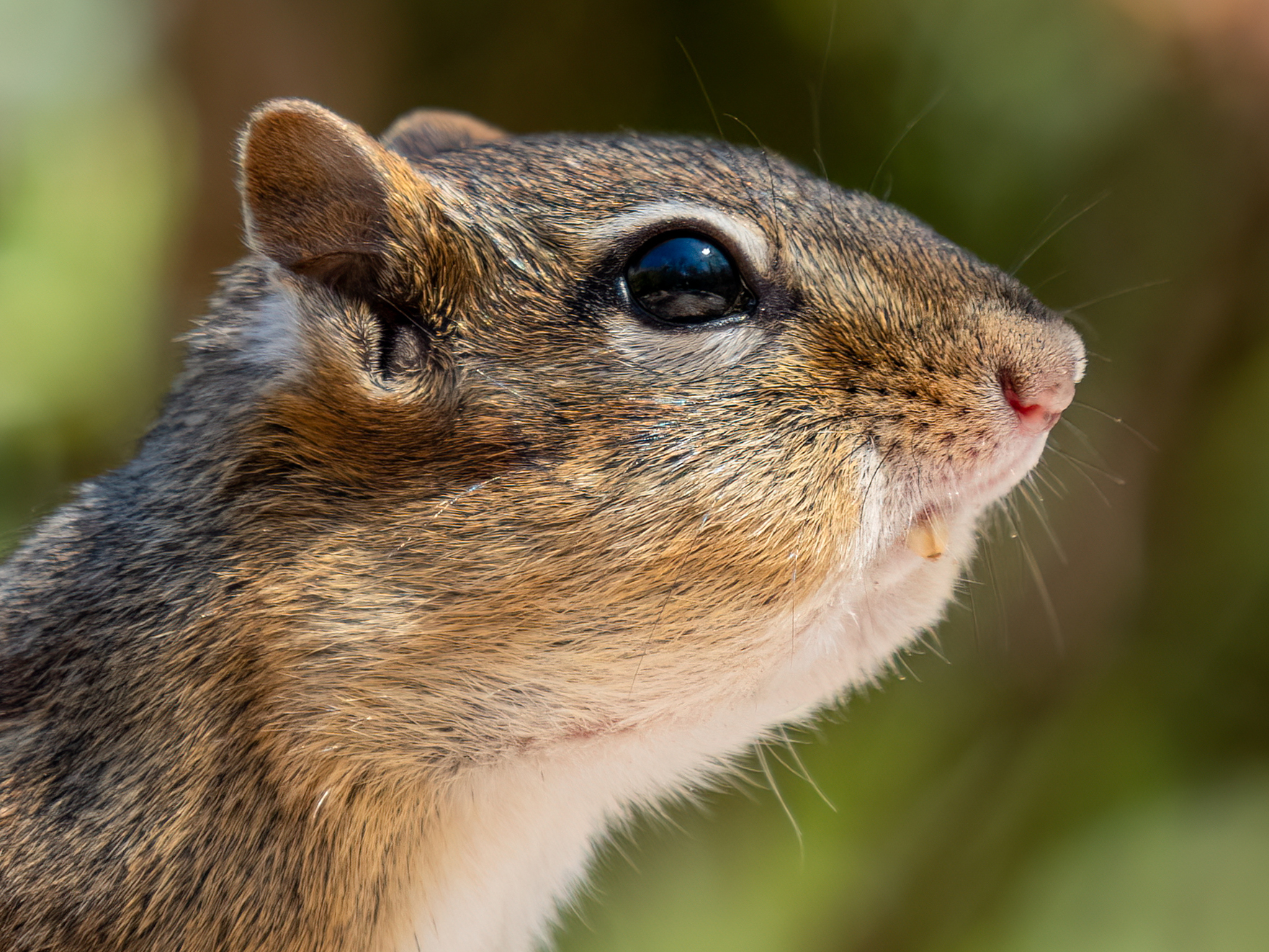
Chipmunk showing the cheek pouch

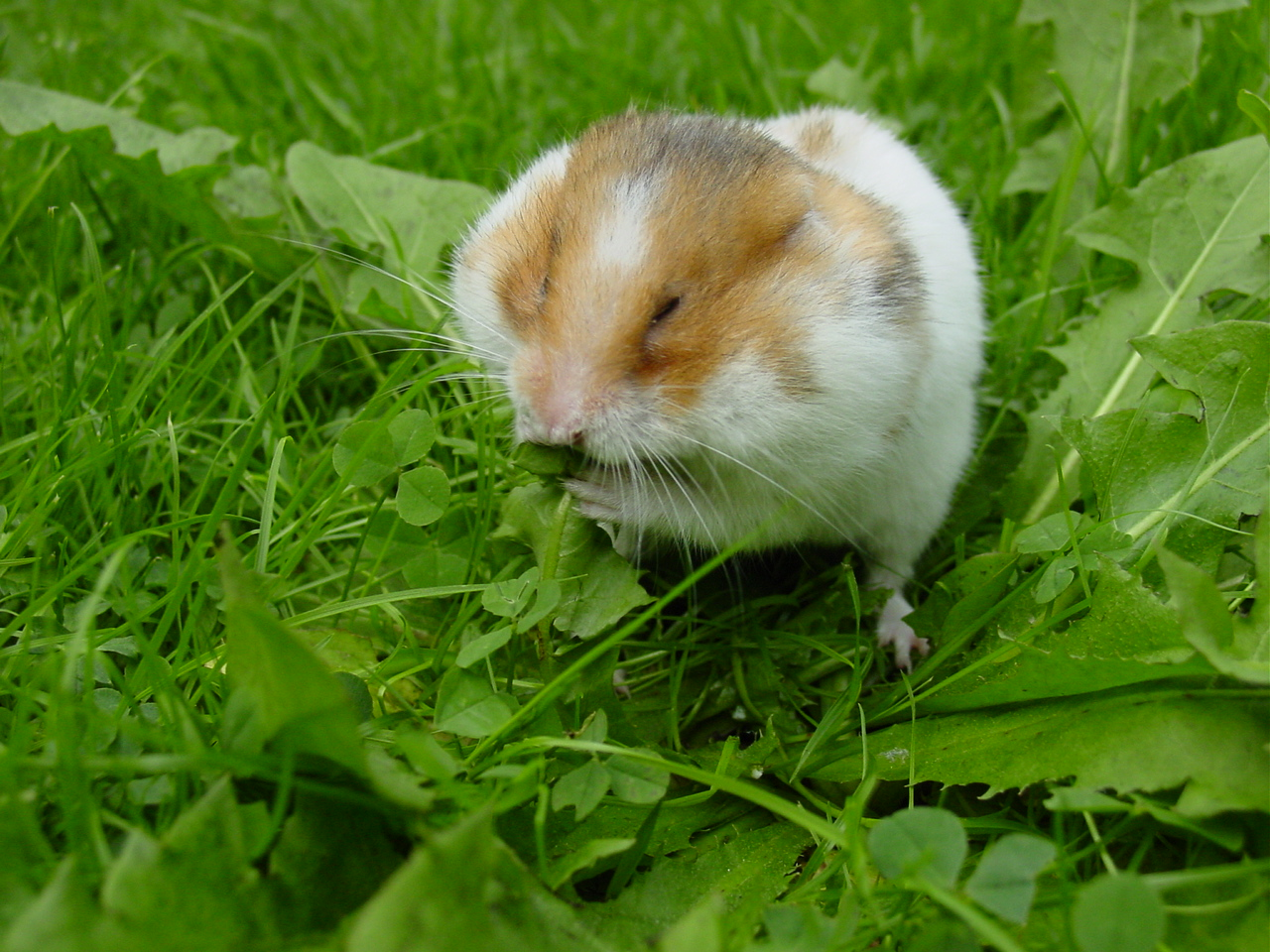
Golden hamster filling his cheek pouches with greenery

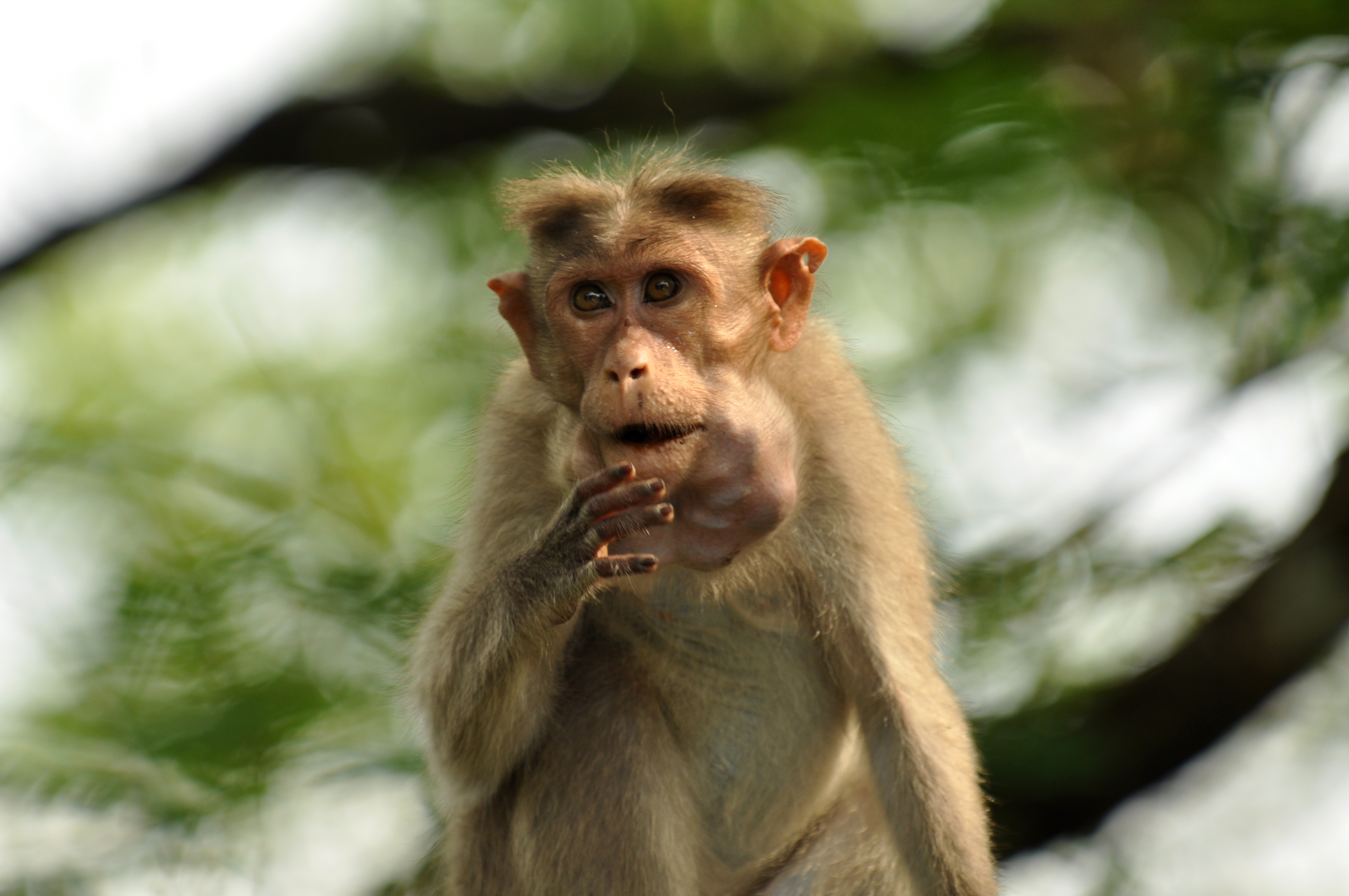
Cheek pouch stuffed with fruits in bonnet macaque

Cheek pouches are pockets on both sides of the head of some mammals between the jaw and the cheek. They can be found on mammals including the platypus, some rodents, and most monkeys, as well as the marsupial koala.

== Description and function ==
Cheek pouches are located in the thickness of the flange on both sides of the head of some mammals. In some species, such as hamsters, the cheek pouches are remarkably developed; they form two bags ranging from the mouth to the front of the shoulders. Cheek pouches facilitate the rapid collection of food as well as temporary storage and transport of both food and non-food items in several species. Étienne Geoffroy Saint-Hilaire described that some bats of the genus Nycteris have an amazing form of cheek pouches, as they have a narrow opening, through which the bat can introduce air, closing the nasal canal through a special mechanism and pushing air under the skin, so they expire in the tissue, which unites the very loose skin to the underlying muscles. Monkeys of the subfamily of Cercopithecinae make functional use of cheek pouches. The females of some species of hamster are known to hide their young in their cheek pouches to carry them away from danger. Other species of hamsters are known to fill their pouches with air, allowing them to float better while they swim.

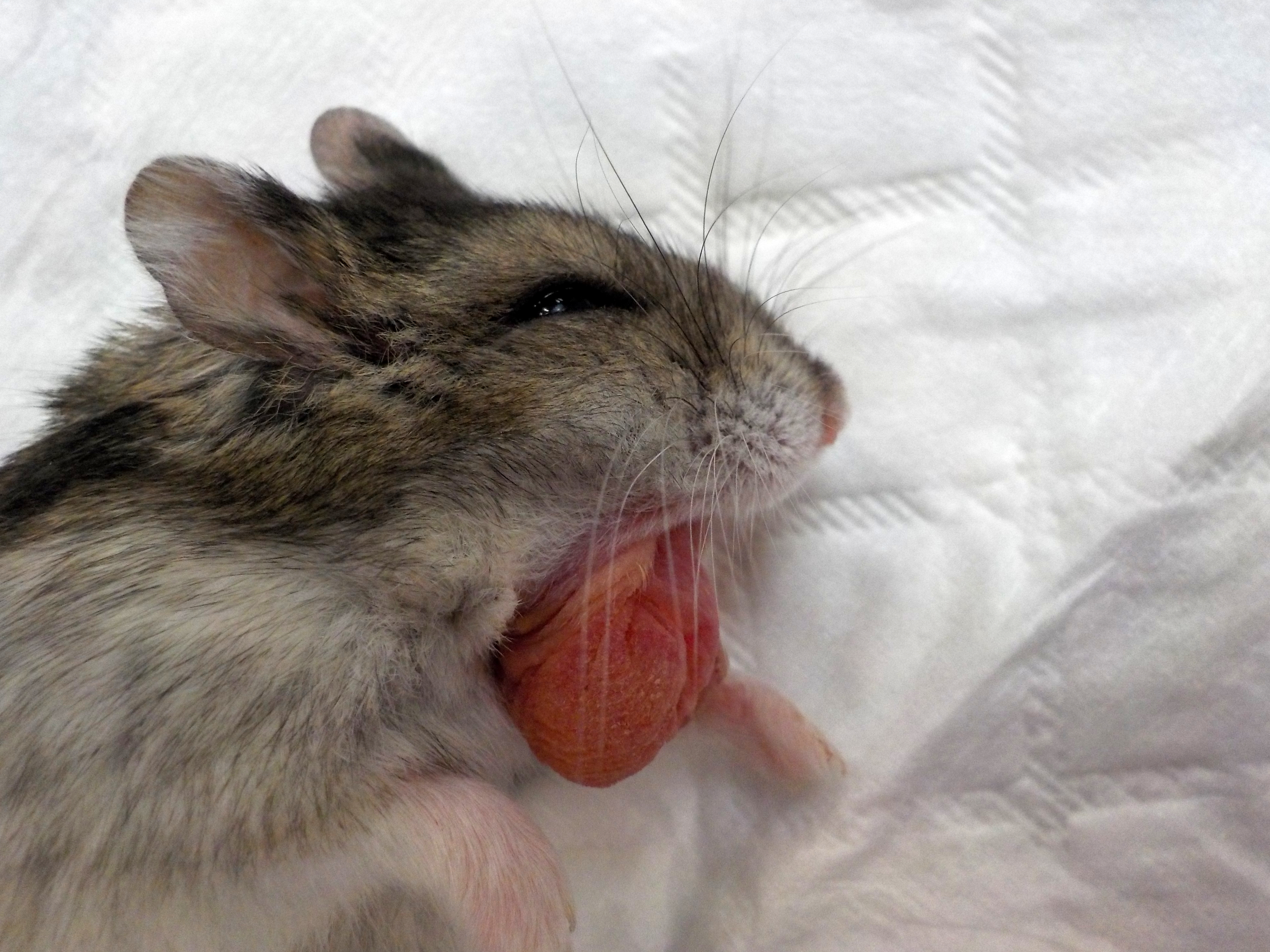
Cheek pouch prolapse in an anesthetized Russian hamster (Phodopus sp.)

Use of cheek pouches for storage is not without risk for the animal. The cheek pouches can become infected as a result of an injury caused by a sharp object inserted into them or a fight. An abscess can form, which can be confused with protuberance with stored food. If the abscess bursts and the pus contained therein is absorbed by the animal, it can develop sepsis and die of the poisonous toxins. Cheek pouches can also become prolapsed.

Hamster cheek pouches have been used as model systems for the study of vascular membranes, healing, and the immune system--notably in the development of abscesses or tumors.

== Examples ==
=== Chipmunks ===
Chipmunks (Tamias) have large cheek pouches that allow them to transport food. The cheek pouches of chipmunks can almost reach the size of their head when full.

Below is the introduction of the legume (pod) of peanut in the cheek pouch of a chipmunk:

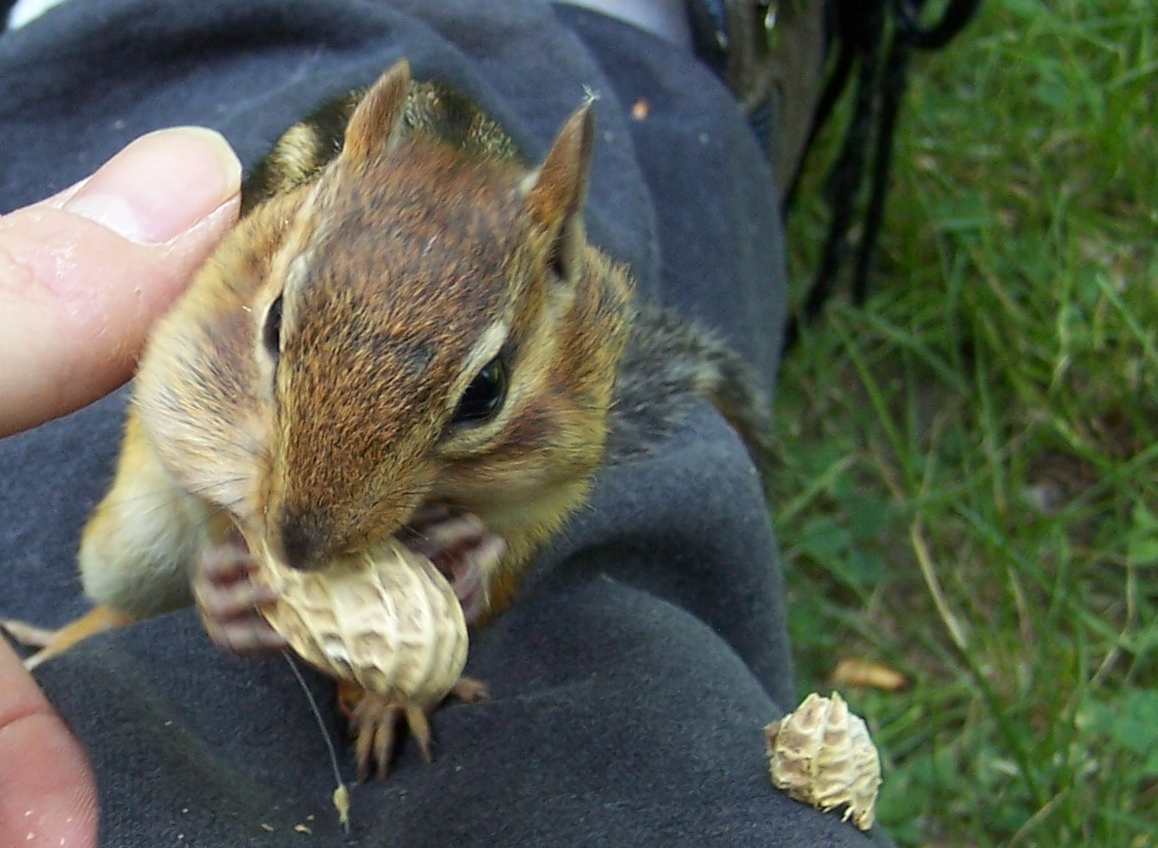
Peanut half entered the cheek pouch

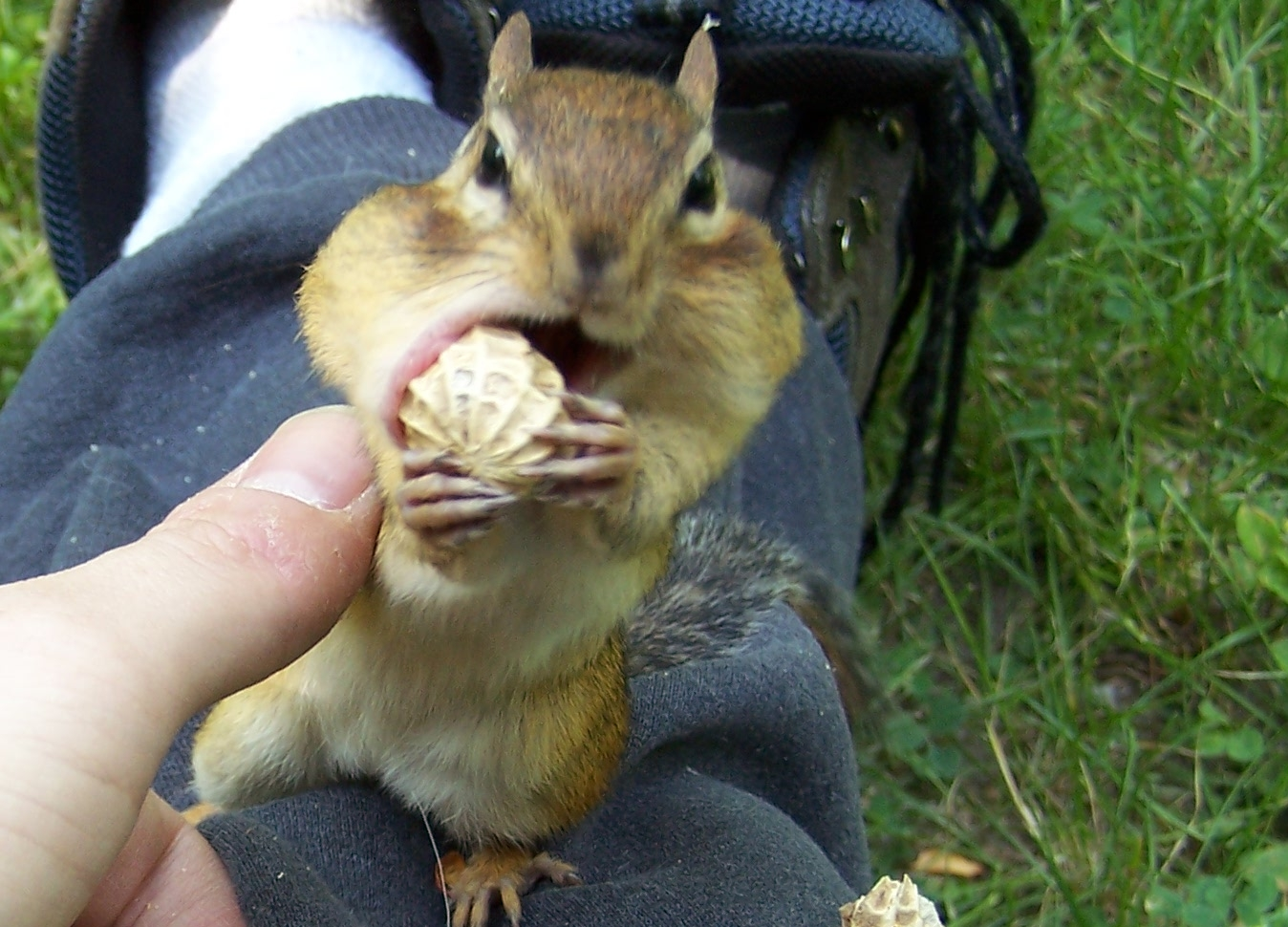
Peanut during storage

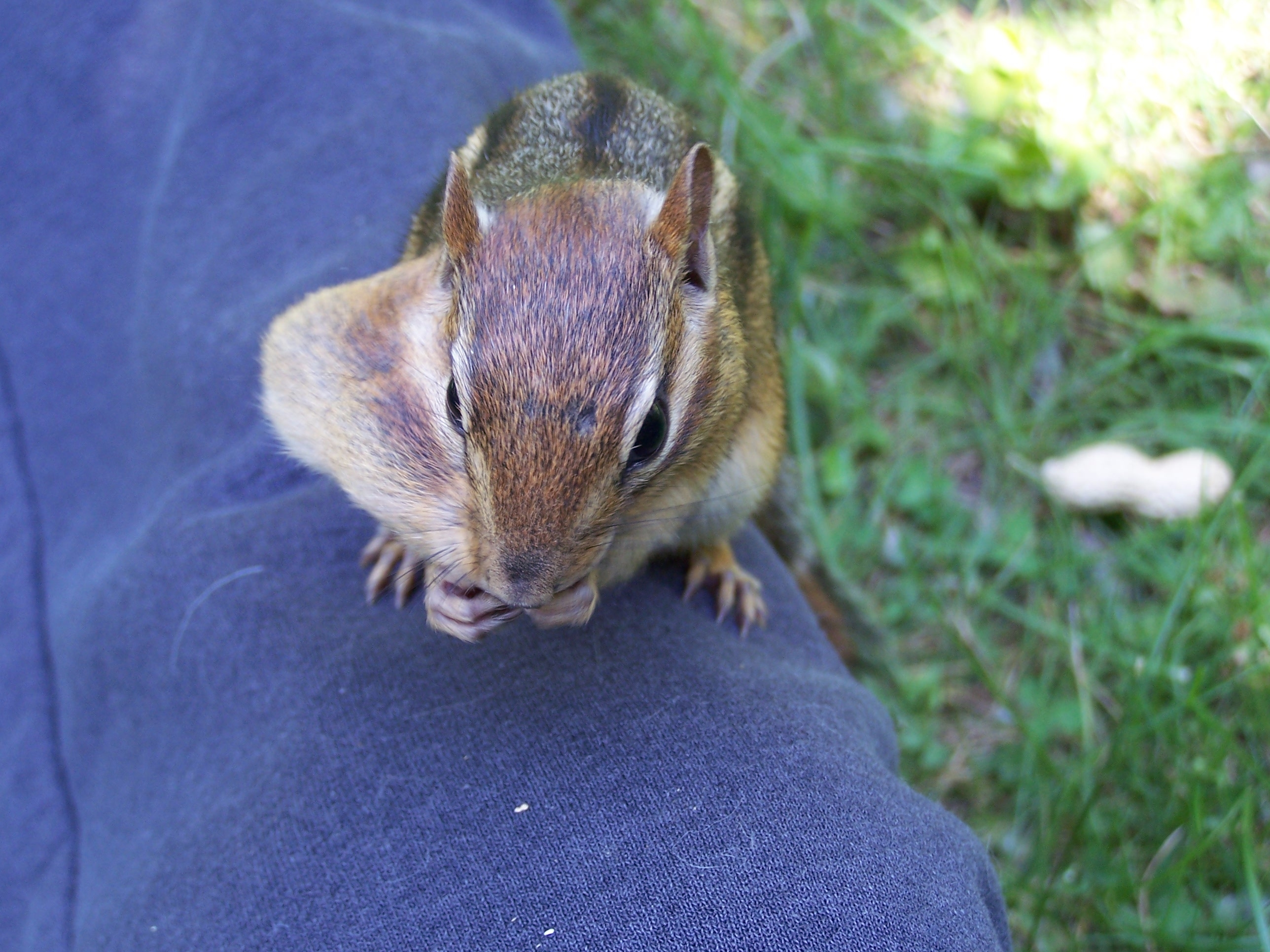
Peanut entirely in the cheek pouch

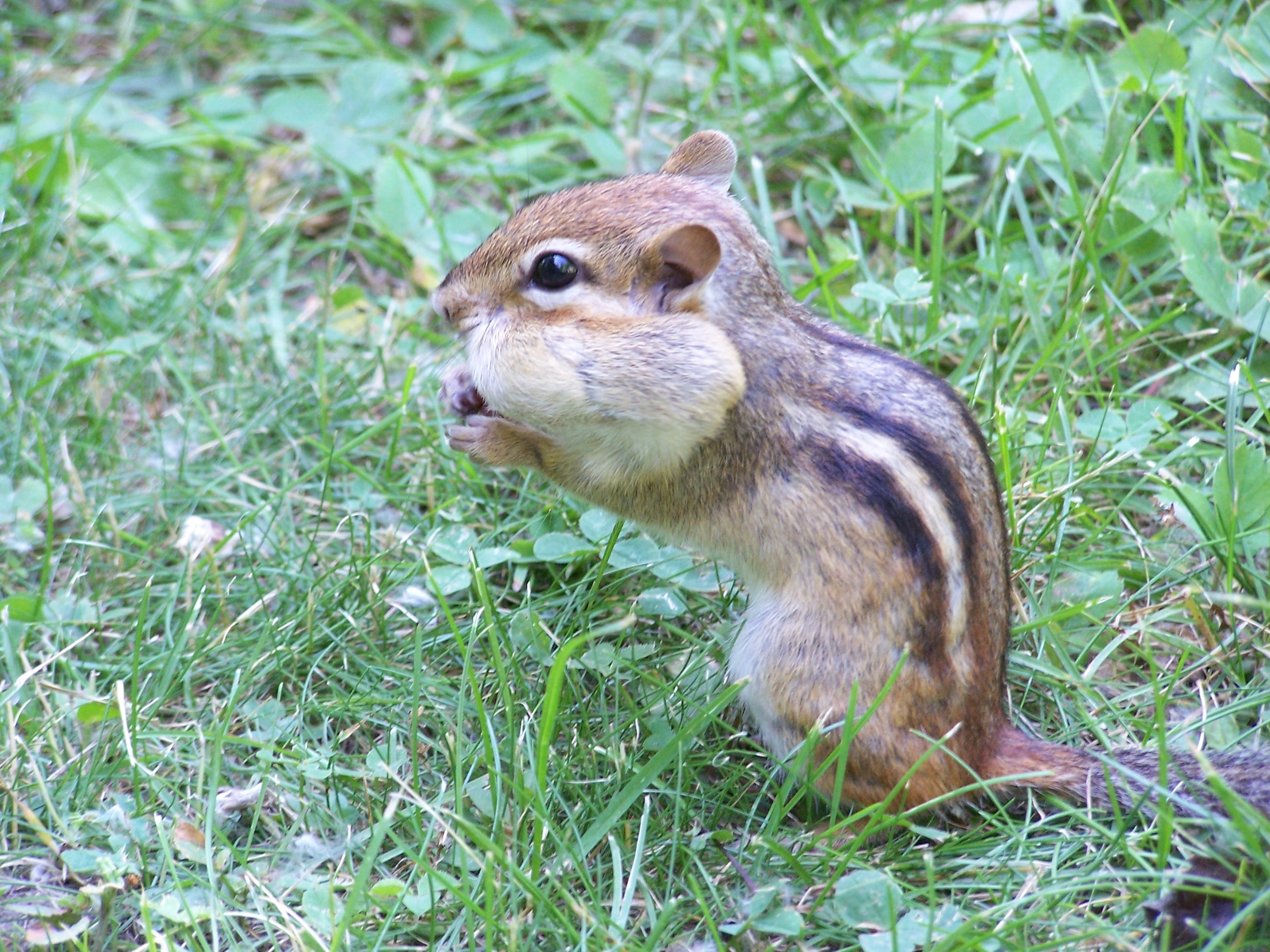
Chipmunk in profile with cheek pouch swollen by a peanut pod

=== Hamsters ===
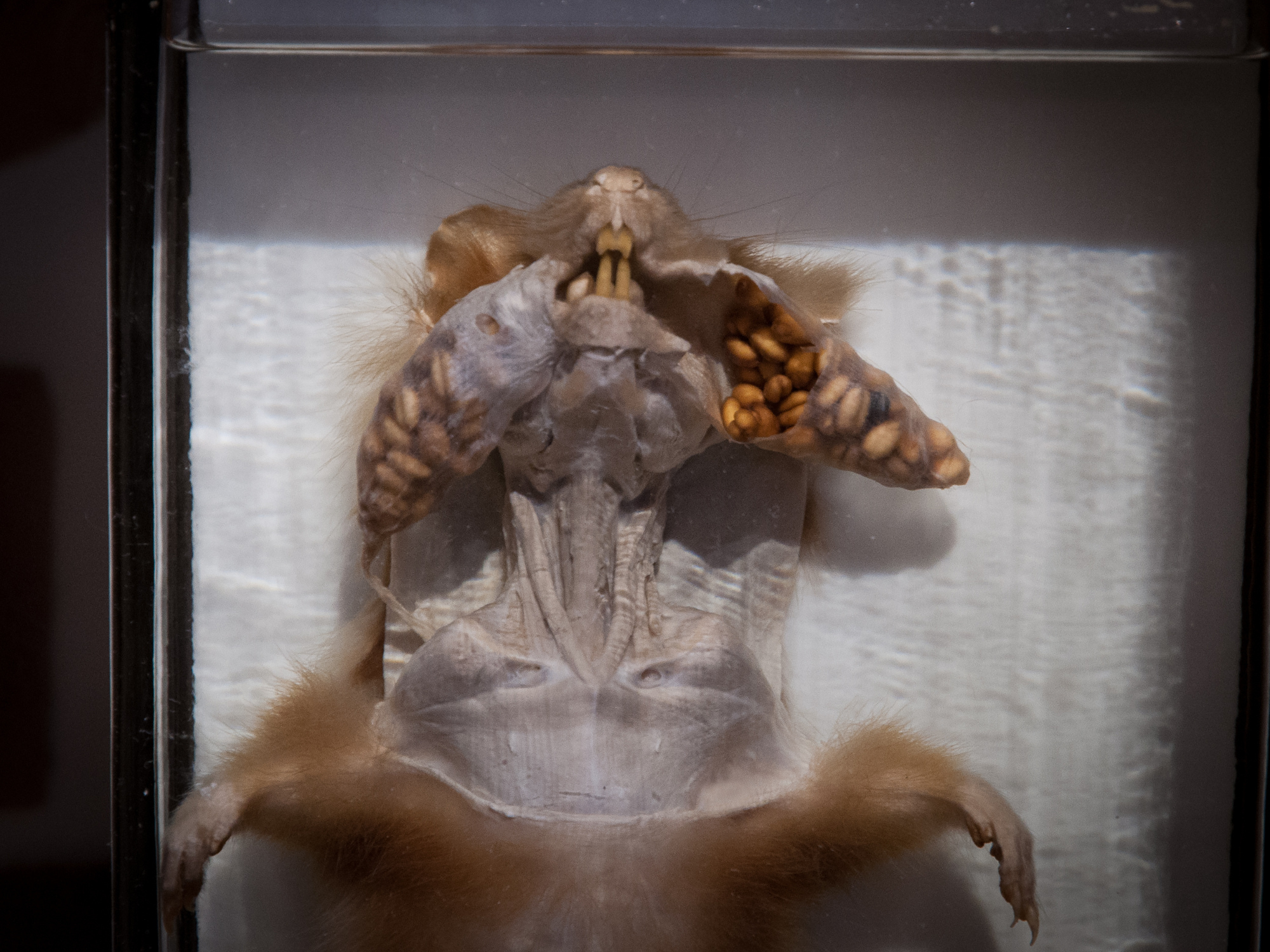
Stretched out cheek pouches of a European hamster

One of the classic behavioral characteristics of hamsters (subfamily Cricetinae) is food hoarding. Hamsters carry food to their underground storage chambers using their spacious cheek pouches. A hamster "can literally fill its face with food." When full, the pouches can make the hamsters' heads double, or even triple in size.

=== Platypus ===
The platypus feeds on annelid worms, insect larvae, freshwater shrimps, and yabbies (freshwater crayfish) that it digs out of the riverbed with its snout or catches while swimming. It uses its cheek pouches to carry prey to the surface for eating.

== Misconception with Rattus rattus ==
The cheek pouch is a specific morphological feature that is evident in particular subgroups of rodents (e.g. Heteromyidae and Geomyidae, or gopher), yet a common misconception is that certain families, such as Muridae (including the common black and brown rats), contain this structure when in fact their cheeks are merely elastic due to a high degree of musculature and innervation in the region. The true cheek pouch, however, is evident in the former Heteromyidae and Geomyidae groups.

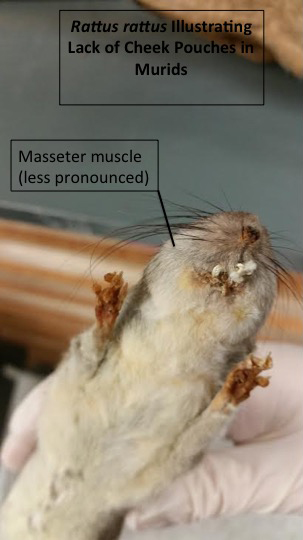
Murid lacking cheek pouches

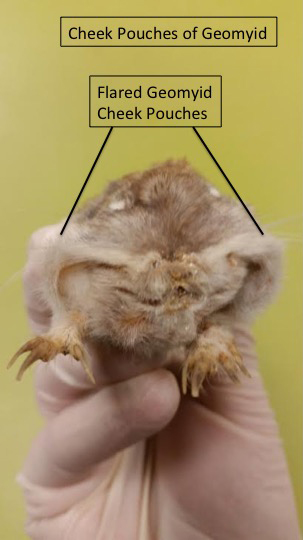
Demonstration of cheek pouches in geomyid

Cheek pouches are more pronounced in certain rodents, such as hamsters, yet this structure is also distinguishable on certain species of rat, like the Gambian pouched rat, of which extensive morphological investigations have been conducted. Aspects including rat pouch musculature, vascularization, and innervation were all explored and compiled through this and other studies. The widely distributed Rattus rattus is an example of the rodent family Muridae that lacks a true cheek pouch; rather, they exhibit more elastic cheeks (not true pouches) due to the organization of their cheek musculature.

Concerning the musculature, the cheek pouch is composed primarily of a developed masseter (cheek) muscle that exhibits a high tensile ability. The masseter muscle has been shown to insert into the pectoralis muscles, allowing for a higher degree of food retention. The pouch is clearly divided between a buccal (cheek) and sublingual (below the tongue) portion. Volumetric analyses within this study attributed the differences in net cheek volume between male and female rats to the average size of the respective sexes.

Due to muscle's high nutritional demand, this muscle exhibits vascularization that has been highly studied. Dissections at Boston University by Frank Brodie describe the various bifurcations (or splittings) of the common carotid. This artery splits into an internal and external branch, of which the latter extends dorsally and divides into five branches that supply the general cheek region. The branch that extends dorsally to the ear is known as the auricular branch.

As for innervation of this structure, the associated nerve branches were all found to originate from the facial (CN VII of XII) nerve that initiates at the medulla and passes into the facial canal via the stylomastoid foramen. The primary aforementioned muscle, the masseter, is supplied by two large neural branches known as the temporalis and zygomatic nerves. The buccal divisions of this nerve supply much of the masseter muscle, which ultimately facilitates the voluntary retention of food within the cheek pouch.
