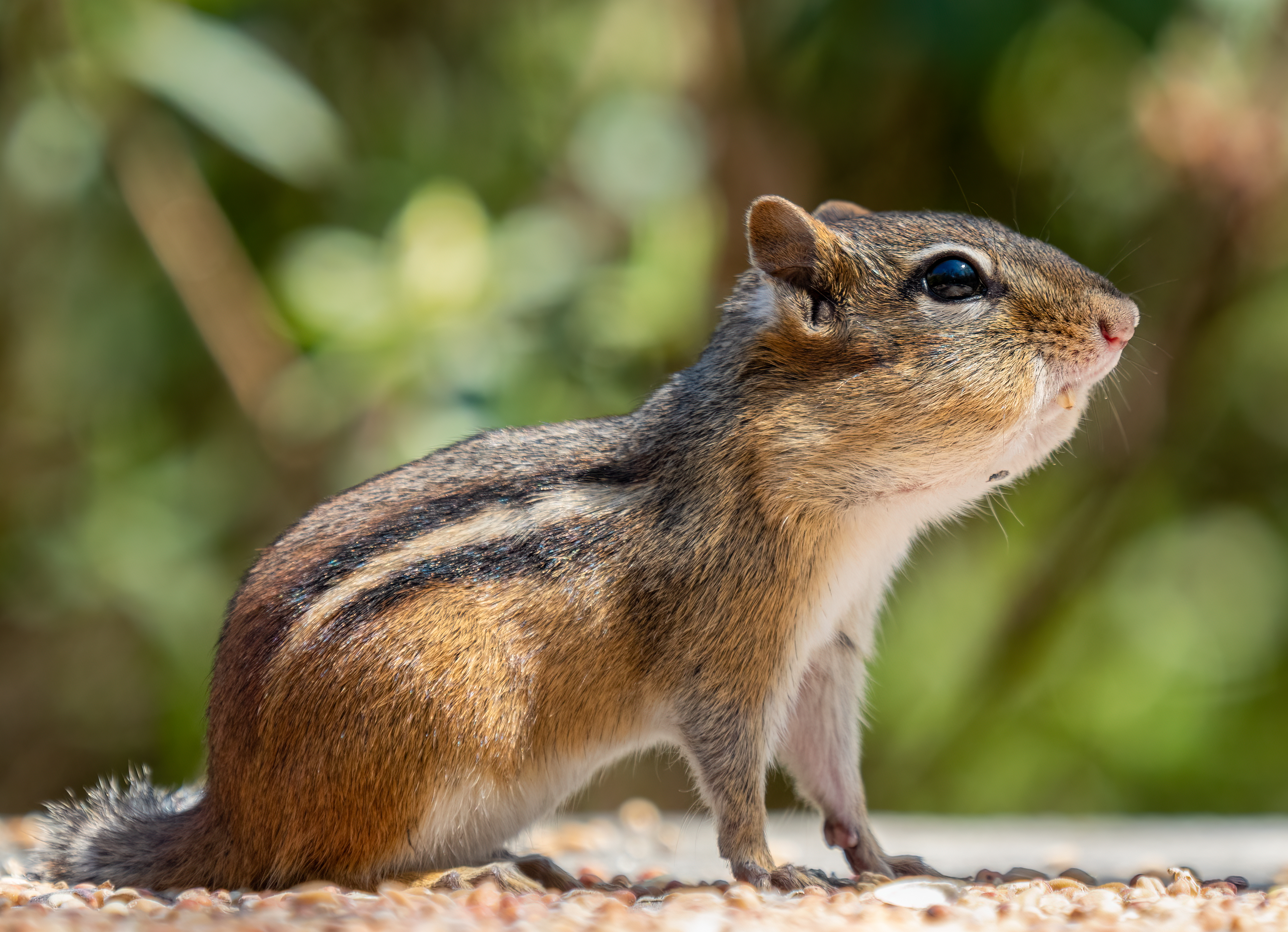
- Eastern chipmunk (Tamias striatus)

Scientific classification
- Kingdom: Animalia
- Phylum: Chordata
- Class: Mammalia
- Order: Rodentia
- Family: Sciuridae
- Subtribe: Tamiina
- Genus: Tamias; Illiger, 1811

Type species
- Sciurus striatus Linnaeus, 1758

Species
- Tamias striatus

= Tamias =

Genus of rodents

Tamias is a genus of chipmunks in the tribe Marmotini of the squirrel family. The genus includes a single living species, the eastern chipmunk (Tamias striatus). The genus name Tamias (Greek: ταμίας) means "treasurer", "steward", or "housekeeper", which is a reference to the animals' role in plant dispersal through their habit of collecting and storing food for winter use.

Caged Tamias chipmunk, Tokyo area

The genus Tamias was formerly divided into three subgenera that, in sum, included all chipmunk species: Tamias, the eastern chipmunk and other fossil species; Eutamias, of which the Siberian chipmunk (E. sibiricus) is the only living member; and Neotamias, which includes the 23 remaining, mostly western, species. These classifications are subjective, and most taxonomies over the twentieth century have placed the chipmunks in a single genus. However, studies of mitochondrial DNA show that the divergence between each of the three chipmunk groups is comparable to the genetic dissimilarity between Marmota and Spermophilus, so they are now often considered as separate genera.

In addition to the eastern chipmunk, some fossil species from Eurasia have been assigned to this genus:

- †Tamias allobrogensis; Mein and Ginsburg, 2002 – Miocene of France
- †Tamias anatoliensis; Bosma et al., 2013 – Miocene of Turkey
- †Tamias atsali; De Bruijn, 1995 – Pliocene of Greece
- †Tamias eviensis; De Bruijn et al., 1980 – Miocene of Greece
- †Tamias urialis; Munthe, 1980, described from the Miocene of Pakistan, may be more closely related to Tamiops.

One American fossil species, †Tamias aristus from the late Pleistocene, has been identified.
