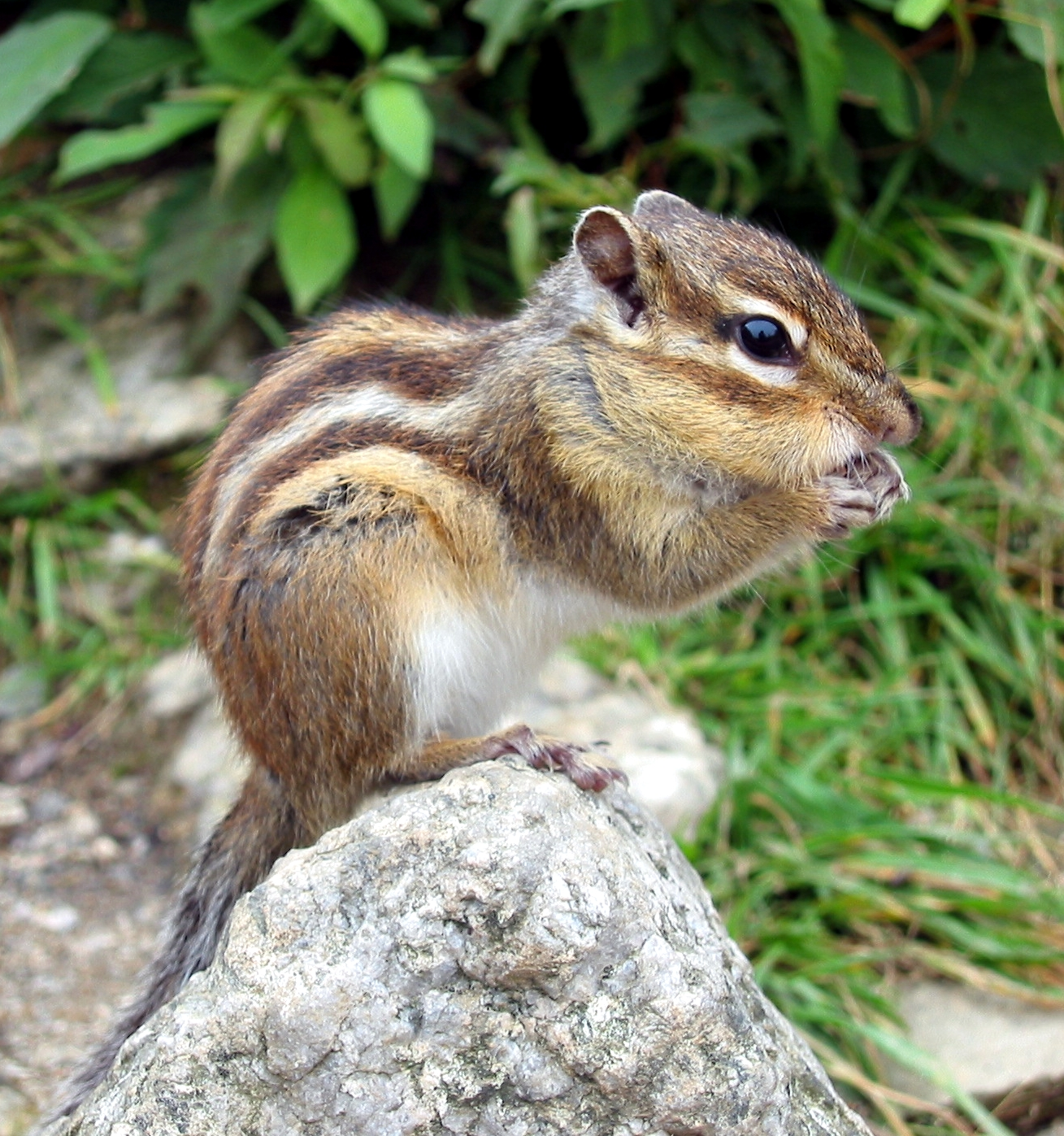
- On the mountain of Seoraksan, South Korea

Conservation status
- Least Concern (IUCN 3.1)

Scientific classification
- Kingdom: Animalia
- Phylum: Chordata
- Class: Mammalia
- Infraclass: Placentalia
- Order: Rodentia
- Family: Sciuridae
- Genus: Eutamias
- Species: E. sibiricus

Binomial name
- Eutamias sibiricus (Laxmann, 1769)

Subspecies
- E. s. sibiricus; E. s. asiaticus; E. s. lineatus; E. s. okadae; E. s. ordinalis; E. s. orientalis; E. s. pallasi; E. s. senescens; E. s. umbrosus
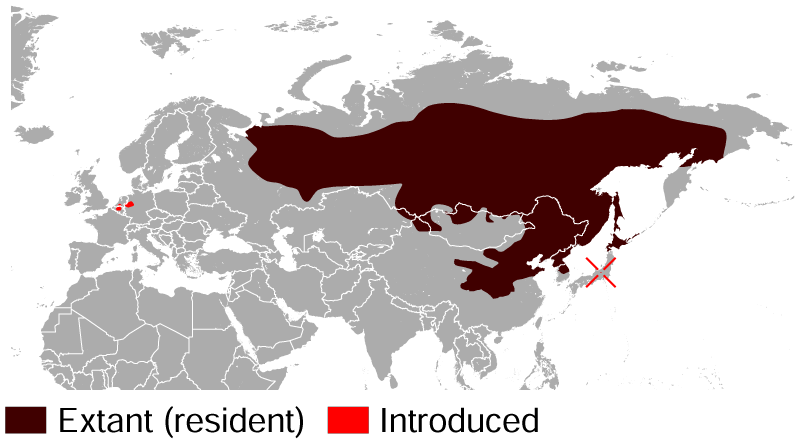
- Siberian chipmunk range.

Synonyms
- Tamias sibiricus (Laxmann, 1769)

= Siberian chipmunk =

Species of mammal

The Siberian chipmunk (Eutamias sibiricus), also called common chipmunk, is a species of chipmunk native to northern Asia from central Russia to China, Korea, and Hokkaidō in northern Japan. It was imported from South Korea and introduced in Europe as a pet in the 1960s.

== Description ==
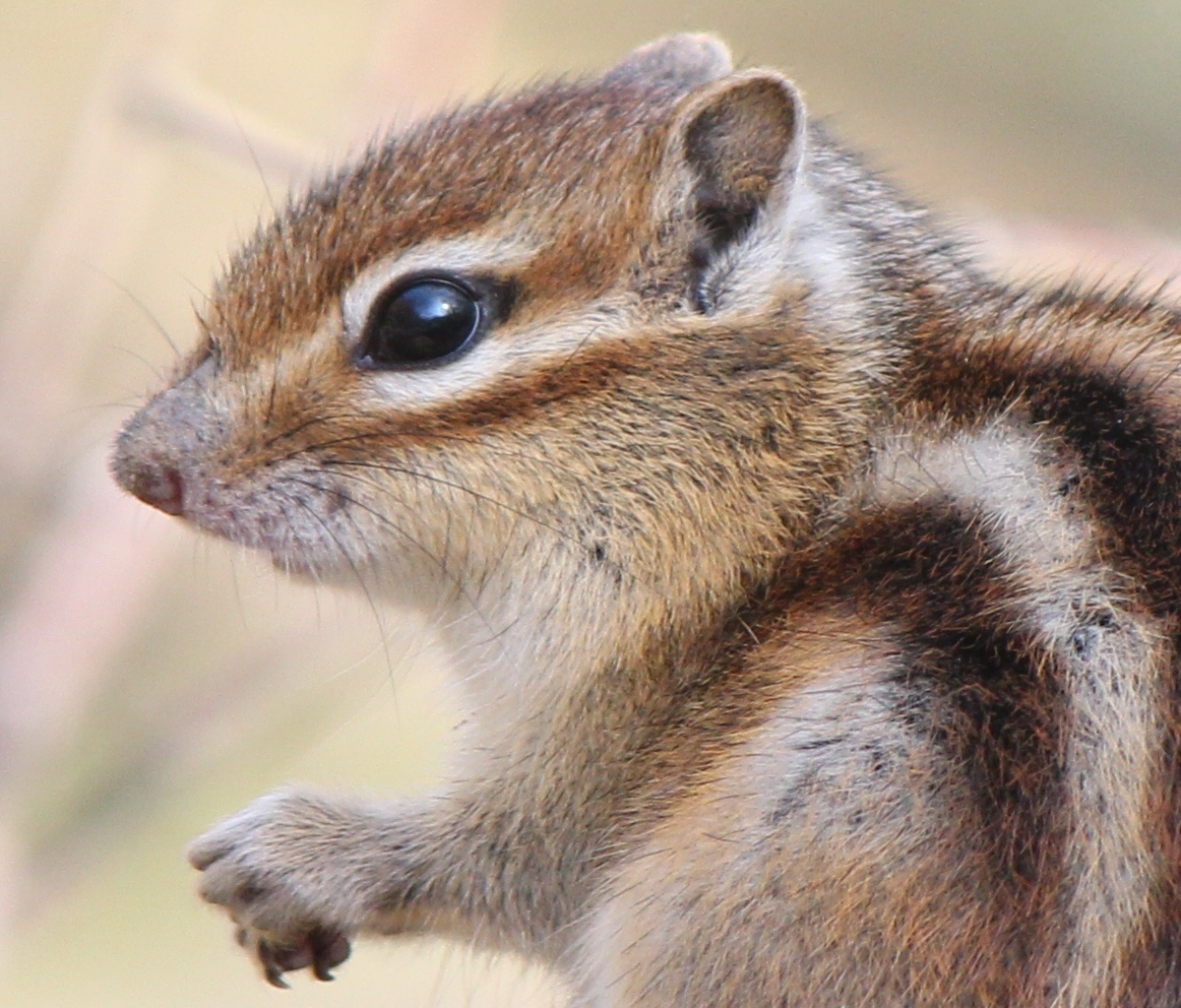
Close-up of head

Typically the Siberian chipmunk has four white stripes and five dark stripes along the back. It is 18–25 cm (7.1–9.8 in) long, a third of which is the tail. The weight of adults depends on the time of year and food availability. It exhibits slight variations in coloration in different geographic regions. Even though the Siberian chipmunk normally grows to 50–150 g (1.8–5.3 oz). The Siberian chipmunk does not exhibit sexual dimorphism, and size and body proportions are the only way to distinguish younger chipmunks from older ones. Its small size may contribute to its relatively short life from two to five years in the wild. However, in captivity it lives up to ten years.

== Distribution ==
The only species of chipmunk found outside North America, the Siberian chipmunk is native to Russia in northern European, Siberia to Sakhalin and Kunashir, extreme eastern Kazakhstan, northern Mongolia, northern and central China, Korea, and in Japan in Hokkaido, Iturup, Rishiri, Rebun, Teuri, and Yagishiri. It has been introduced at one confirmed locality, Karuizawa, on Honshu.

During the 1960s, South Korea began to export these animals to Europe as pets. Between 1960 and 1980, South Korea exported more than 200,000 individuals to Europe.

In the 1970s there were sightings in parks in Europe, and a number of small populations have become resident in suburban forests and urban parks in Belgium, France, Switzerland, Germany, Italy, the Netherlands, Austria and Great Britain. This is mostly caused by owners releasing these animals because they no longer wanted them as pets, or the owners purposefully freed the chipmunks to live naturally in the wild. Other Siberian chipmunks escaped from captivity and inhabited the forested areas of Europe. The Dutch chipmunks for example are escapees from a former zoo in Tilburg. When the zoo was shut down and all animals were moved away, many chipmunks got forgotten due to their underground residence. While thousands of animals were introduced to new environments, they are not very invasive and are naturally slow spreading, 200 to 250 metres (660 to 820 ft) per year, which prevented them from rapidly moving to areas far beyond where they escaped. In 2009, 22 introduced populations in Europe, and 11 in France, were identified in forests and urban parks since the 1970s (not all may still be extant).

== Invasiveness ==
In Europe, the Siberian chipmunk is included since 2016 in the list of Invasive Alien Species of Union concern (the Union list). This mandates that the species cannot be imported, bred, transported, commercialized, or intentionally released into the environment in the whole of the European Union.

== Habitat ==
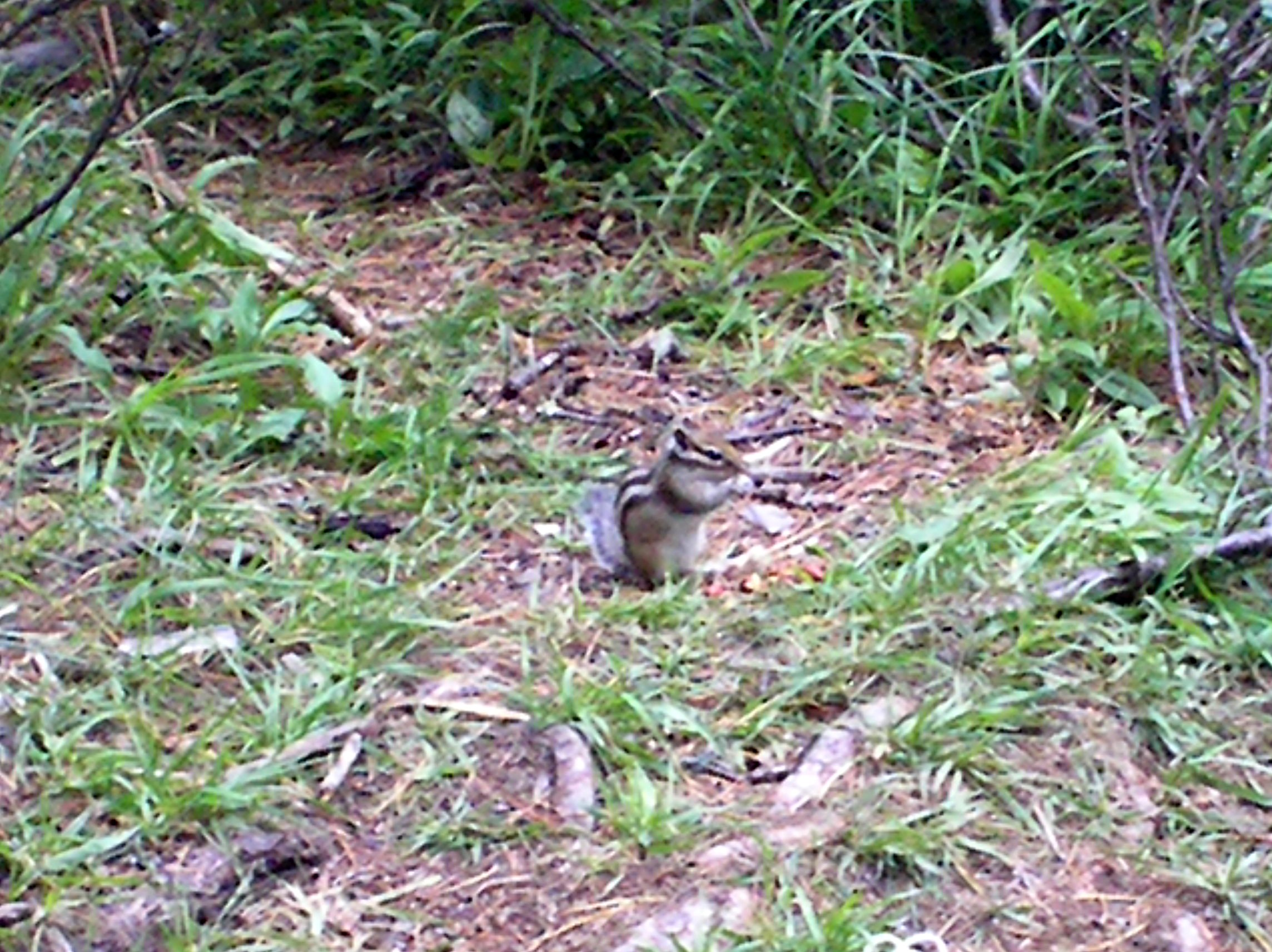
Eutamias sibiricus near Lake Kuyguk

The Siberian chipmunk can survive in a variety of habitats and conditions. They are usually found in coniferous forests, stony areas within forests and mountains, habitats filled with shrub, along waterways or roads, or other small patches of agricultural land. In Europe, the introduced populations usually live in deciduous forests, mixed deciduous and coniferous forests, or urban areas with greenery. Eutamias sibiricus is able to survive in various environmental conditions, anywhere from 29°N to 69°N latitude, and temperatures from −65 °C to 30 °C. However, this species has a low ability of dispersal, and since they are mainly introduced into woody forests or urban areas with greenery, they have less potential to be naturally dispersed to other regions. Also they have trouble overcoming man-made and naturally occurring obstacles, like roads or swamps.

The Siberian chipmunk lives in loose colonies, where every individual has its own territory. The territory ranges from 700 to 4000 m^{2} and is larger for females than males and is also larger in autumn than spring. The Siberian chipmunk marks its territory with urine and oral glands inside of its cheeks. This method illustrates one way in which this species communicates with one another.

== Behaviour ==
Siberian chipmunks usually live solitary lives, but during the winter they create a burrow, which they often share with another chipmunk. Its burrow, which can be 2.5 m (8 ft 2 in) long and 1.5 m (4 ft 11 in) deep, consists of a nest chamber, several storage chambers and chambers for the waste. During this winter season, these chipmunks store 3–4 kg (6.6–8.8 lb) of food in order to survive underground until April or May. In addition to pairing off during hibernation, they also use a complex voice communication system to interact. They have two vocal sounds, a fast, sharp sound for when they are frightened and a deep croak sound that is thought to be used for mating.

Chipmunks with more active and curious behaviour, based on trappability of marked individuals, have a greater number of ticks.

=== Reproduction ===
It is known that they are iteroparous, viviparous, and their breeding season usually occurs after hibernation in mid April. They tend to breed only once or twice a year, and the number of offspring varies from three to eight. The young are born blind and naked, and they weigh between 3–5 g (0.11–0.18 oz). After the 28- to 35-day gestation period, the offspring open their eyes about 20 to 25 days after birth. The females are responsible for caring for the young, and they teach them how to forage around six weeks. Then the offspring complete the weaning stage around seven weeks, and they reach the independent stage around eight weeks. Adult body mass is reached at around three to four months, and by nine months, both the male and the female reach sexual maturity.

=== Diet ===
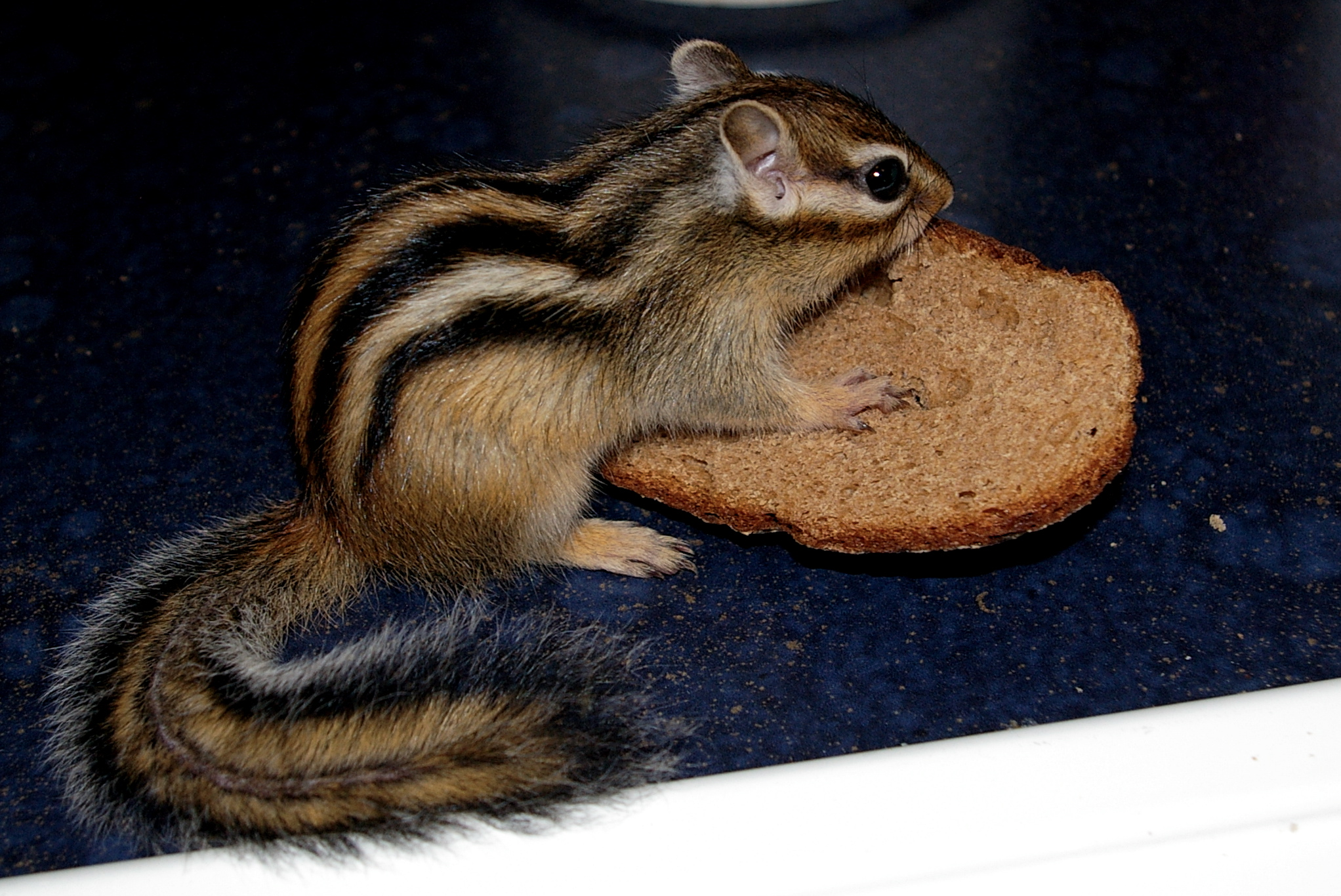
A Siberian chipmunk eating bread

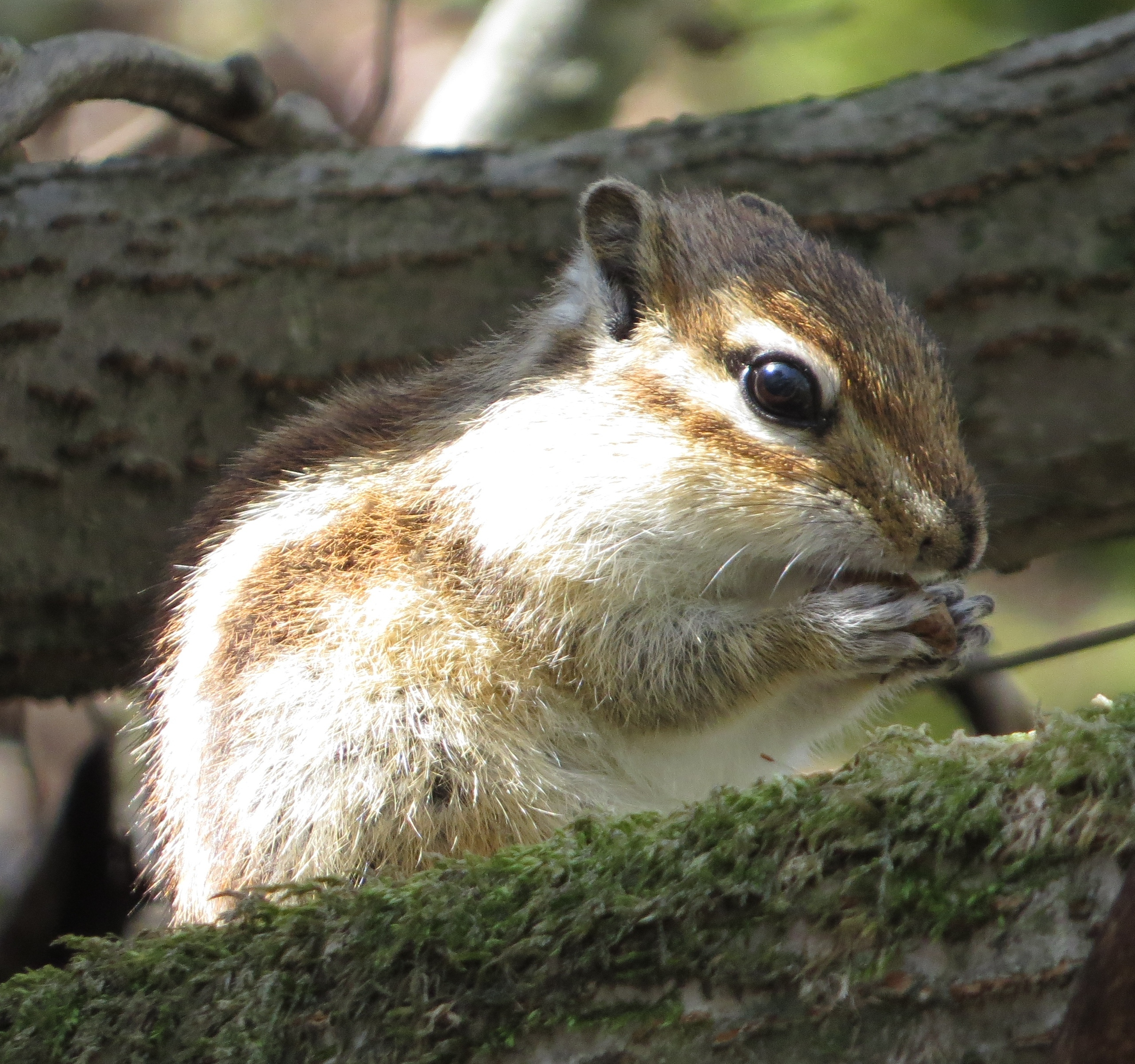
A chipmunk eating a nut, photographed in Mount Oike, Higashiomi, Shiga prefecture, Japan.

Siberian chipmunks are omnivores that store or cache food. Normally, they eat pine seeds, along with different deciduous and coniferous tree seeds. In addition to seeds, they eat herb roots, insects, molluscs, birds, reptiles, grains, fruit, and fungus.

== Ecology ==
Siberian chipmunks are essential food sources for other animals, such as diurnal raptors, weasels, and small cats. Other known predators include hawks, owls, and foxes. They evade being preyed upon by these animals by being alert, hiding in their burrows, and using their camouflaged fur to blend in with surroundings. They distribute seeds and fungal spores, and other animals feed off their stored food. They may help control forest tree pests. In Russia, they eat approximately 50 percent of the forest nuts. In Belgium, these chipmunks have been blamed for preying upon low-nesting birds.

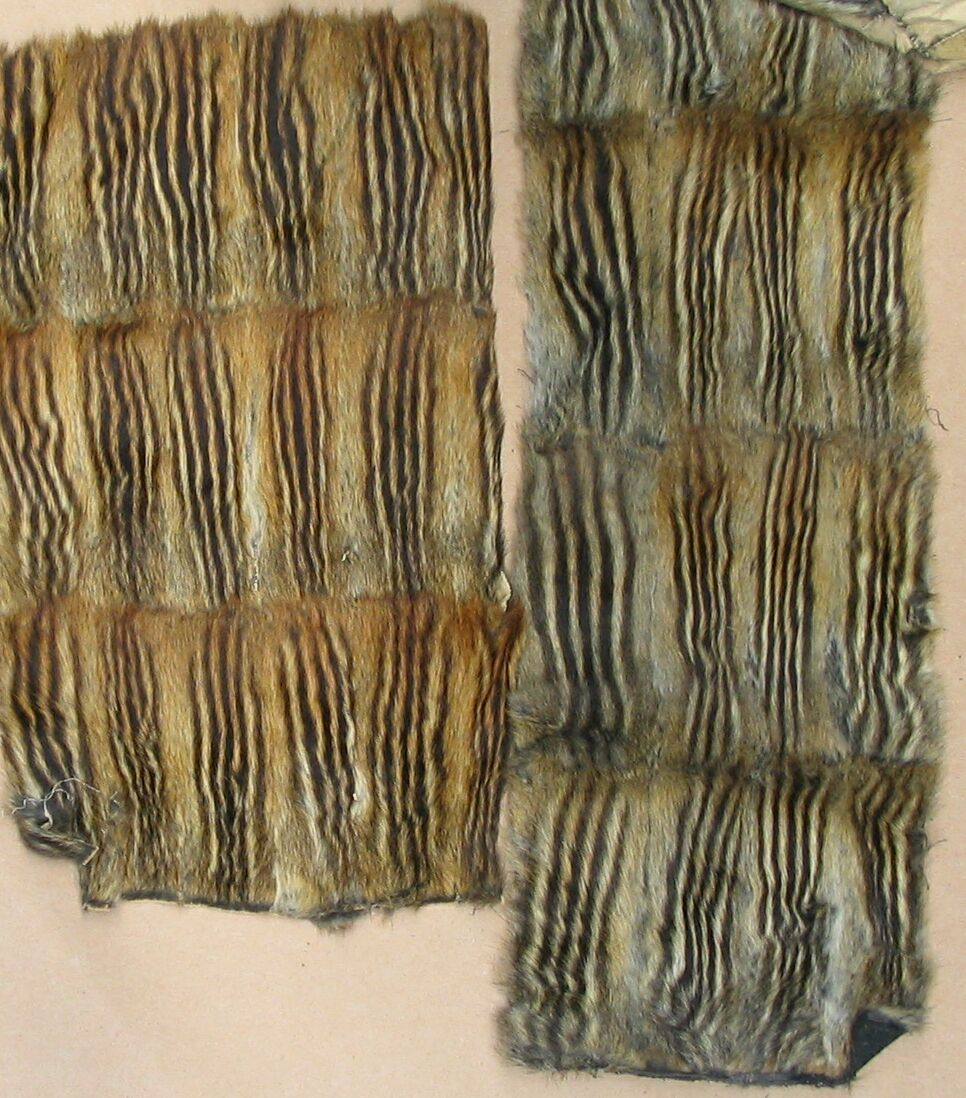
Chipmunk fur-skins

If the species were introduced to Britain, it is possible that Siberian chipmunks may compete with other small animals, such as the red squirrel, wood mouse, and bank vole.

== Relationship to humans ==
Some people keep Siberian chipmunks as pets or sell them for their fur or other body parts. Siberian chipmunks may eat crops and damage gardens. In Russia they can cause serious economic damage to grain fields and orchards.

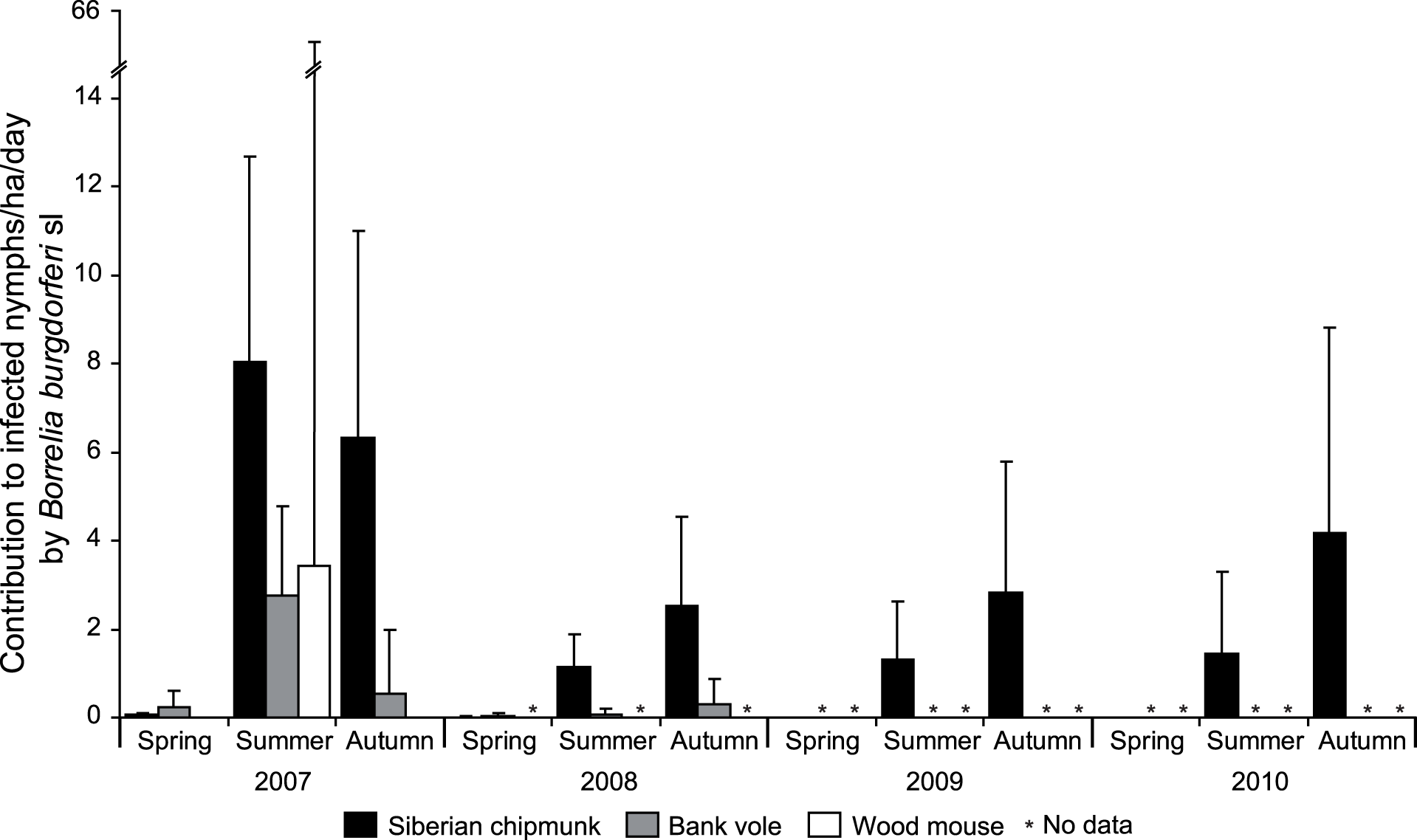
Estimated contribution to Lyme disease comparison chart

The species can carry Lyme disease, caused by the bacteria Borrelia burgdorferi, that can be transmitted through ticks. In a study in a park near Paris where the Siberian chipmunk had established itself, in comparison to bank voles and wood mice, the Siberian chipmunks had a much higher infection load than their native counterparts. Because they were more diseased, it was theorised that they contributed to more infected questing nymph ticks, thus potentially exposing humans to greater risk.
