= Camp Rice Formation =

Geologic formation in Texas and New Mexico, US

- Stratigraphic range: Pliocene–Pleistocene
- Type: Formation
- Unit of: Santa Fe Group
- Overlies: Fort Hancock Formation
- Thickness: 88.3 ft (26.9 m)

Lithology
- Primary: Sandstone
- Other: Caliche

Location
- Coordinates: 31.32°N 105.69°W
- Region: Texas, New Mexico
- Country: United States

Type section
- Named for: Camp Rice Arroyo
- Named by: W.S. Strain
- Year defined: 1966
- Camp Rice Formation (the United States) Camp Rice Formation (Texas)

The Camp Rice Formation is a geologic formation in west Texas and southern New Mexico. It preserves fossils of the Pliocene-Pleistocene. These include the distinctive Tonuco Mountain Local Fauna.

== Description ==
The formation consists of poorly cemented sandstone, conglomerate, siltstone, volcanic ash, and caliche. The color varies from pink to gray to light brown. The thickness at the type section is 88.3 ft (26.9 m), where the formation rests unconformably on the Fort Hancock Formation. The formation is capped by caliche that forms steep slopes. Where the caliche is eroded away, the underlying strata form badlands. The formation is found throughout the Hueco Basin and Mesilla Basin. Outcrops at the Tonuco Uplift northwest of Las Cruces, New Mexico, are unusually well cemented. In the southern Rio Grande rift, the formation contains numerous calcic paleosols (preserved soil layers formed in an arid climate).

The formation is interpreted as fluvial deposits following integration of the ancestral Rio Grande through the region. A piedmont facies is found in addition to the axial river facies in southern New Mexico.

Stable isotope data from the formation is consistent with a gradual warming trend in the latest Pliocene and early Pleistocene, with a generally drier climate but increased summer precipitation.

== Fossils ==
=== Mammals ===
Name	Species	Locality	Material	Notes	Images
Camelidae	Indeterminate			A camel relative	
Perrisodactyla	Indeterminate			A perissodactyl	
Glyptodontinae	Indeterminate			A glyptodont	
Equus	E. sp.			An equid	
Equus	E. scotti	Tonuco Mountain		A horse	
Equus	E. simplicidens	Tonuco Mountain		A relative of zebras and donkeys	
Nannippus	N. peninsulatus	Tonuco Mountain		A three-toed equid	
Mammuthus	M. sp.				Woolly mammoth
Cuvieronius	C. sp.			A gomphothere	
Cuvieronius	C. cf. tropicus		A complete skull	A gomphothere	
Tapirus	T. sp.	Tonuco Mountain	A mandible		Malayan tapir
Leporidae	Indeterminate	Tonuco Mountain		A rabbit or hare	
Taxidea	T. sp.	Tonuco Mountain		A badger	The modern American badger
Borophagus	B. sp.	Tonuco Mountain		A borophagine canid	B. secundus
Canis	C. lepophagus	Tonuco Mountain		A canine canid	
Rhynchotherium	R. sp.	Tonuco Mountain			
Camelops	C. sp.	Tonuco Mountain		A large undescribed species	Camelops hesternus
Hemiauchemia	H. sp.	Tonuco Mountain		A camelid	H. macrocephala
Hemiauchemia	H. blancoensis	Tonuco Mountain		A camelid	H. macrocephala
Platygonus	P. bicalcaratus	Tonuco Mountain		A peccary	P. compressus

=== Reptiles ===
Name	Species	Locality	Material	Notes	Images
Gecholone	G. sp.			A tortoise	Modern Indian star tortoise
Kinosternon	K. sp.	Tonuco Mountain		A mud turtle	Modern Eastern mud turtle
Gopherus	G. sp.	Tonuco Mountain		A tortoise	Modern gopher tortoise
Hesperotestudo	H. sp.	Tonuco Mountain		A turtle	H. sp.

=== Birds ===
Name	Species	Locality	Material	Notes	Images
Anatidae	Indeterminate	Tonuco Mountain		A water bird	

== History ==
The formation was first named by W.S. Strain in 1966 for exposures near Camp Rice Arroyo in the Rio Grande valley of west Texas. J.W. Hawley and coinvestigators recommended assigning the formation to the Santa Fe Group in 1969.

Because the exposures of the formation in the Jornada del Muerto basin are relatively undisturbed by human activities, they have been used to test models of floodplain development in a tectonically active basin.

== See also ==
- List of fossiliferous stratigraphic units in Texas
- Paleontology in Texas
