= Chamita Formation =

Geologic formation in New Mexico, U.S.

- Stratigraphic range: Neogene, 13–5.8 Ma
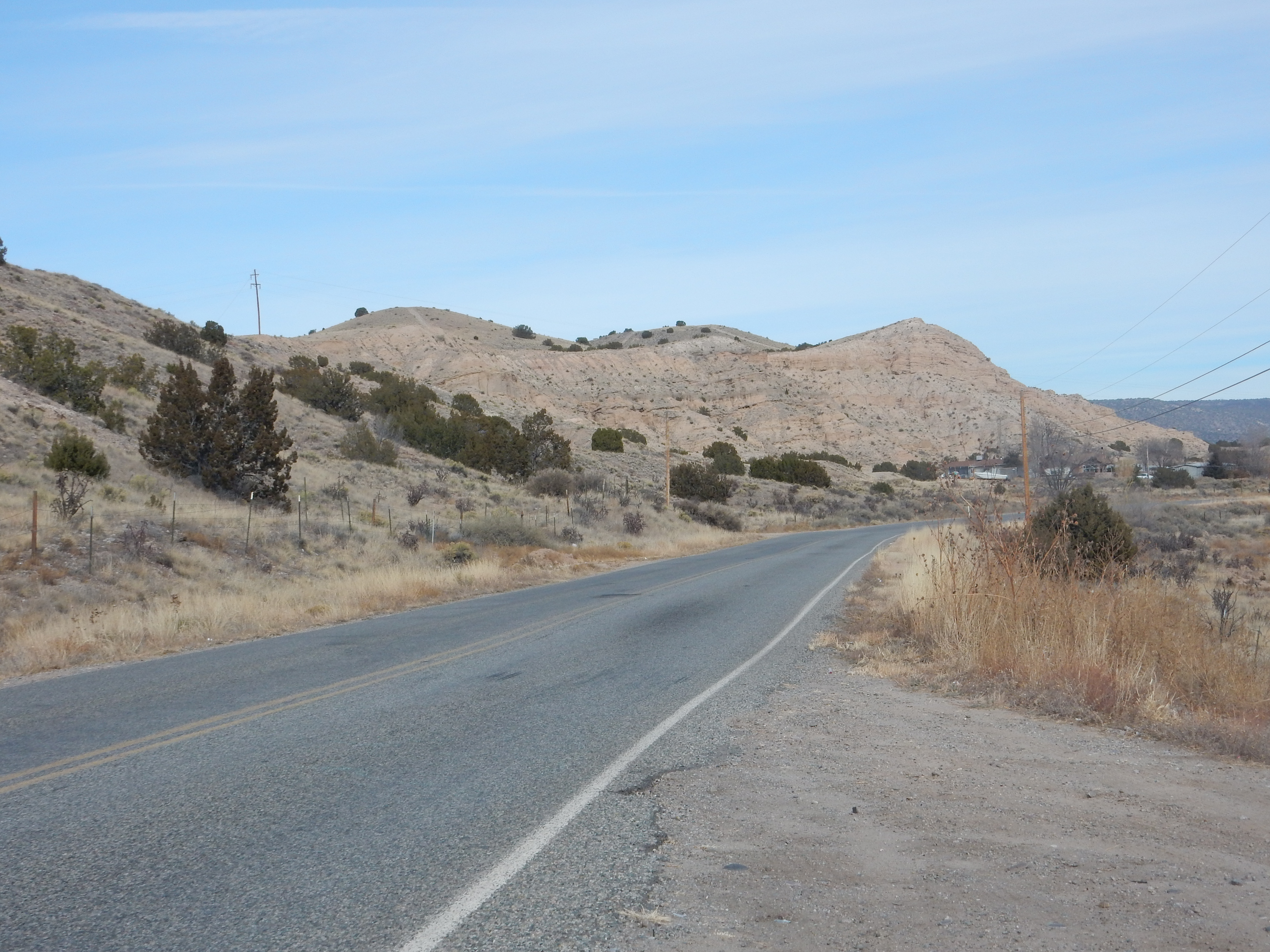
- Chamita Formation near the type section, Chamita, New Mexico
- Type: Geological formation
- Unit of: Santa Fe Group
- Underlies: Puye Formation
- Overlies: Tesuque Formation
- Thickness: 210 metres (690 feet)

Lithology
- Primary: Sandstone
- Other: Tuff, siltstone, conglomerate

Location
- Coordinates: 36.0783°N 106.0864°W
- Region: New Mexico
- Country: United States

Type section
- Named for: Chamita, New Mexico
- Named by: Galusha and Blick
- Year defined: 1971
- Chamita Formation (the United States) Chamita Formation (New Mexico)

The Chamita Formation is a geologic formation in north-central New Mexico. It preserves unique fossils dating back to the Neogene period. The presence of volcanic ash beds in the formation, which can be radiometrically dated, gives the absolute age of the fossils, which is valuable for establishing the geologic time scale of the Neogene.

== Description ==
The formation is mostly coarse quartz sandstone with some coarse gravel. It varies greatly in thickness, likely due to extensive erosion.

There are two prominent tuffaceous zones used by Galusha and Blick for regional correlation. Each is about 30 meters (98 feet) thick and they are separated by 80 meters (260 feet) of tan sediments. Radiometric dating shows that the age of the Upper Chamita Tuffaceous Zone is 6.93 ±0.05 million years at its base and 6.78 ±0.03 million years at its top, essentially identical with the Peralta Tuff, which it also chemically resembles. This helps establish the absolute date for the late Hemphillian, since a fossil assemblage of that stage is found in the zone. The Lower Chamita Tuffaceous Zone has a radiometric age of 7.7 ±0.3 million years. The age range for the complete section has been estimated as 9.5 to 5.8 million years. However, more recent work has yielded an age range of 12 to 13 Ma for a Lower Coarse White Ash Zone towards the base of the formation, which is thickest northeast of the Jemez Mountains and has been interpreted as ash fall from early silicic volcanic activity from vents now buried under later flows.

The base of the formation contains sediments resembling the underlying Ojo Caliente Member of the Tesuque Formation. This is interpreted as reworking of sediments in a changed sedimentation environment rather than interfingering. In other words, the lower part of the formation contains sediments eroded from the Ojo Caliente Member, rather than recording a fluctuating depositional environment.

Members of the formation include the Cejita and Cuarteles Members west of the modern Rio Grande River and the Pilar Mesa, Vallito, and Hernandez Members on both sides of the Rio Grande.

== Fossil content ==
The Round Mountain Quarry has produced numerous fossils from the Chamita Formation. The artiodactyl Osbornoceros osborni was first located in the formation in the Lyden area, as was the only known specimen of the taxideine badger, Chamitataxus.

Color key: Taxon / Reclassified taxon / Taxon falsely reported as present / Dubious taxon or junior synonym / Ichnotaxon / Ootaxon / Morphotaxon	Notes; Uncertain or tentative taxa are in small text; ~~crossed out~~ taxa are discredited.

=== Mammals ===
==== Carnivorans ====
Carnivorans reported from the Chamita Formation
Genus	Species	Presence	Material	Notes	Images
Aelurodon	A. taxoides	Round Mountain Quarry, Rio Arriba County, New Mexico.	Rami (F:AM 67048, F:AM 67049, F:AM 67052) & a right maxillary fragment (F:AM 107703).	A borophagine dog.	
Borophagus	B. secundus	Leyden Quarry, Rio Arriba County, New Mexico.	Left ramus (F:AM 61637).	A borophagine dog.	
Eucyon	E. ferox	Leyden Locality, Rio Arriba County, New Mexico.	Left partial ramus (F:AM 27388).	A canine dog.	
Carpocyon	C. webbi	Black Mesa, San Ildefonso, Rio Arriba County, New Mexico.	"F:AM 27365, left ramal fragment with m1 broken–m2 and m3 alveolus".	A borophagine dog.	
Chamitataxus	C. avitus		"An almost complete skull with left and right I1-M1".	A badger.	
Epicyon	E. haydeni	Pojoaque Member, Santa Fe County, New Mexico.	Skull, vertebral & limb remains.	A borophagine dog, locality may instead be of the Tesuque Formation.	
Epicyon	E. saevus	Round Mountain Quarry, Rio Arriba County, New Mexico.	Multiple rami & maxillae.	A borophagine dog.	
Eucyon	E. davisi	Rio Arriba County, New Mexico.	Jaw elements.	A canine dog.	
Leptocyon	L. matthewi	Round Mountain Quarry, Rio Arriba County, New Mexico.	Skull remains & metatarsals.	A canine dog also known from the Ash Hollow, Snake Creek & Esmeralda formations.	
Pseudaelurus	P. cf. P. hibbardi	Black Mesa Quarry, Rio Arriba County, New Mexico.	Partial right dentary (NMMNH 45109).	A puma-sized felid.	
Vulpes	V. stenognathus	Rio Arriba County, New Mexico.	Several rami.	A fox.	

==== Lagomorphs ====
Lagomorphs reported from the Chamita Formation
Genus	Species	Presence	Material	Notes	Images
Hypolagus	H. gidleyi		Mandible (AMNH(FAM) 116845).	A leporid, specimen formerly assigned to H. vetus.	
Hypolagus	H. cf. H. gidleyi	Black Mesa Quarry, Rio Arriba County, New Mexico.	Left upper cheek tooth (NMMNH 45110).	A leporid.	
Hypolagus	H. cf. H. ringoldensis	Albuquerque, New Mexico.	A mandible (BUNM A7960).	A leporid, specimen possibly from this formation.	
Leporidae	Genus & species indeterminate	Black Mesa Quarry, Rio Arriba County, New Mexico.	Teeth & limb elements.	Leporid remains undiagnostic below family level.	

==== Proboscideans ====
Proboscideans reported from the Chamita Formation
Genus	Species	Presence	Material	Notes	Images
Gomphotherium	G. riograndensis	Battleship Mountain on the San Ildefonso Pueblo, New Mexico.	A lower jaw (F:AM 21140).	A gomphothere.	
Tatabelodon	T. riograndensis	Battleship Mountain on the San Ildefonso Pueblo, New Mexico.	A lower jaw (F:AM 21140).	Regarded a synonym of Gomphotherium.	

==== Rodents ====
Rodents reported from the Chamita Formation
Genus	Species	Presence	Material	Notes	Images
Muridae	Genus & species indeterminate	Black Mesa Quarry, Rio Arriba County, New Mexico.	Left dentary (NMMNH 45125).	A tiny murid mandible.	

==== Ungulates ====
Ungulates reported from the Chamita Formation
Genus	Species	Presence	Material	Notes	Images
Antilocapridae	Genus & species indeterminate	Black Mesa Quarry, Rio Arriba County, New Mexico.	Partial lower cheek tooth (NMMNH 45103), distal metapodial fragment ( NMMNH 45104), humeral head (NMMNH 45116) & entocuneiform (NMMNH 45117).	A medium-sized antilocaprid, cannot be identified to any genus or species as taxonomy of the family is based on horn cores.	
Dinohippus	D. interpolatus	Black Mesa Quarry, Rio Arriba County, New Mexico.	Teeth & metatarsals.	An equid & the most common species from the Black Mesa Quarry.	
Floridameryx	F. klausi	Round Mountain Quarry, Santa Fe County, New Mexico.	14 rami & 2 mandibles.	A gelocid.	
Hemiauchenia	H. cf. H. vera	Black Mesa Quarry, Rio Arriba County, New Mexico.	Two possibly associated carpal elements (NMMNH 45101, right pisiform; NMMNH 45102, right lunar).	A camelid.	
Megatylopus	M. cf. M. matthewi	Black Mesa Quarry, Rio Arriba County, New Mexico.	Dentary fragment (NMMNH 45105), 3 associated fragments of an upper molar ( NMMNH 45106), a partial distal humerus (NMMNH 45129) & 5 vertebrae.	A camelid.	

== History of investigation ==
The beds making up the unit were originally included by Bryan and McCann in 1937 in the Middle Red member of the Santa Fe Formation. This became the Tesuque Formation in 1956.

In 1971, Galusha and Blick split the uppermost beds from the Tesuque Formation as the Chamita Formation based on differences in lithology and fossil assemblage.

== See also ==
- List of fossiliferous stratigraphic units in New Mexico
- Paleontology in New Mexico
