= Rio Grande Valley (New Mexico) =

River valley of the Rio Grande in New Mexico, United States

- Valle de Río Grande (Spanish)
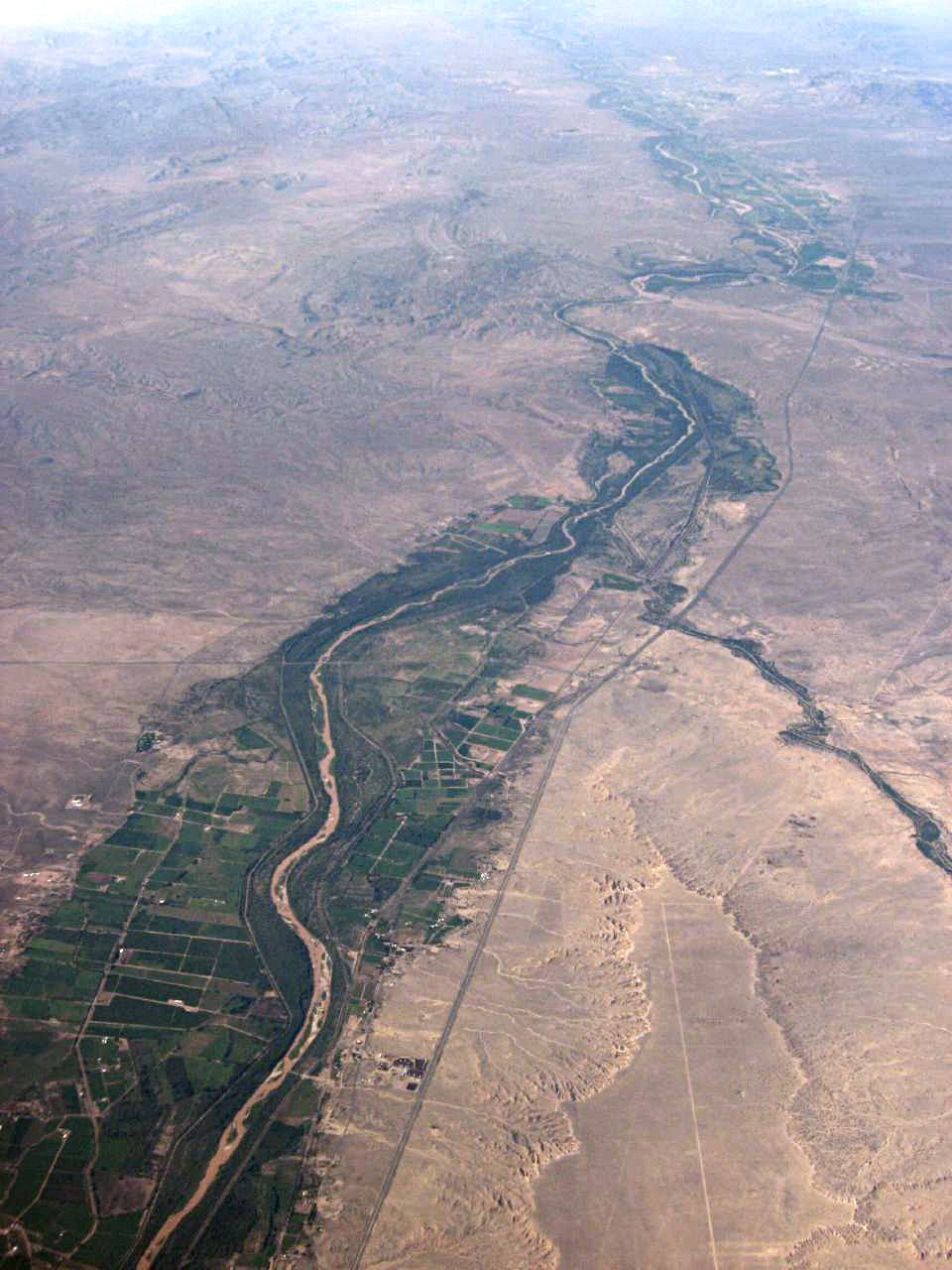
- Rio Grande Valley near Socorro, New Mexico
- Length: 230 mi (370 km) N-S

Geology
- Type: River valley
- Age: 2.06 Ma

Geography
- Country: United States
- State: New Mexico
- Population centers: Albuquerque; Socorro; T or C; Las Cruces
- Borders on: New Mexico-Texas (3 mi (4.8 km))
- Coordinates: 33°41′52.41″N 106°57′19.78″W
- River: Rio Grande
- Interactive map of Rio Grande Valley

The Rio Grande Valley is the river valley carved out by the Rio Grande as it flows through the American Southwest and northeastern Mexico, forming a part of the border region. In the US state of New Mexico, the river flows mostly north to south, and forms a valley from near Cochiti Pueblo to the state line near El Paso, Texas, along the floors of the large sedimentary basins of the Rio Grande Rift, and includes the narrow sections between the basins. It has been historically settled first by the Pueblo peoples, the Spanish, the Mexicans, and finally Anglo-Americans. As the largest river in the state, some of New Mexico's most populous cities are located wholly or partially in the valley, including Albuquerque, New Mexico's largest city.

The Rio Grande Valley is vital to the state's surface and groundwater municipal water supply, recreation, and agriculture, including irrigated farmland, the Rio Grande Valley AVA, the Mesilla Valley AVA, and the largest acreages of land for growing chile peppers and pecans in the United States, accounting for 77% and 14% of US production, respectively.

== Geography ==
The middle Rio Grande Valley begins at Cochiti Lake where the river exits the Española Basin west of Santa Fe, and forms a shallow valley along the floor of the Santo Domingo Basin, where it hosts mainly Puebloan agriculture. The valley runs through Albuquerque Basin, the location of Albuquerque, New Mexico's largest city, between the aptly named East and West Mesas. It is also the location of Rio Grande Valley State Park. The valley narrows to the south of this basin before entering the Socorro Basin near Sevilleta National Wildlife Refuge. The valley (and river) trend mostly north–south to -southwest, supporting agriculture in a thin green ribbon across the Chihuahuan Desert. It enters Elephant Butte Reservoir, the largest water body in New Mexico, between Bosque del Apache National Wildlife Refuge and the city of Truth or Consequences. Between Elephant Butte and Caballo Reservoir, the river supports very little agriculture. Ojos (hot springs) are located along the valley floor, and many spas offer natural mineral soaks in T or C. South of Caballo, the valley supports highly fertile lands of the Hatch region where most of the domestically produced chile peppers in the United States are grown. This part of the valley is known as the "Hatch Valley". The valley becomes constrained again before entering the Mesilla Basin where it hosts large tracts of agricultural fields. The river exits the valley south of Las Cruces, the second-largest city in the state, and flows mostly southeast between Texas and Mexico to the Gulf of Mexico.

The first and largest modification structure in the valley is Cochiti Dam at the river's confluence with the Santa Fe River. Other major dams are Elephant Butte Dam and Caballo Dam. Diversion structures are, north to south, Angostura, Isleta, San Acacia, Percha, Leasburg, Mesilla, and American Diversion Dams. Additionally the Albuquerque/Bernalillo County Water Utility Authority (ABCWUA) operates an adjustable height dam to supply the city with drinking water.

The valley hosts the Pueblo communities of Cochiti, Kewa, San Felipe, Sandia, and Isleta. Other population centers include Albuquerque, Socorro, T or C, Hatch, and Las Cruces.

== Geology and hydrology ==
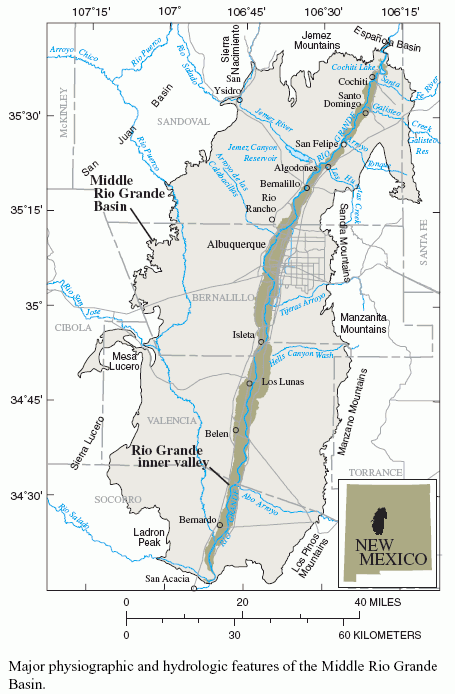
Map of the Middle Rio Grande Basin showing a section of the Rio Grande Valley (tan) before entering the Socorro Basin to the south

The entire Rio Grande Valley in New Mexico follows the Rio Grande Rift, a structural rift caused by the westward extension of the continental basement of the Western United States during the past 35 million years. The rift itself extends from Colorado in the north to Chihuahua in the south, where the river no longer flows. The valley is therefore also a rift valley.

Before the Ancestral Rio Grande was integrated into a single watercourse, the valley was a series of closed bolsons each draining into a central playa. An axial river existed in the Espanola Basin as early as 13 million years ago, reaching the Santo Domingo Basin by 6.9 million years ago. However, at this time, the river drained into a playa in the southern Albuquerque Basin where it deposited the Popotosa Formation. The ancestral Rio Grande progressively integrated basins to the south, reaching the Palomas basin by 4.5 million years, the Mesilla basin by 3.1 million years, to Texas by 2.06 million years.

== Ecology ==
Although the Rio Grande flows primarily through desert and arid lands, the valley floor nearest the river supports a rich bosque habitat, featuring large cottonwood gallery forests. The bosque has been cleared in areas for agricultural fields. The fields themselves provide a habitat for migratory birds.

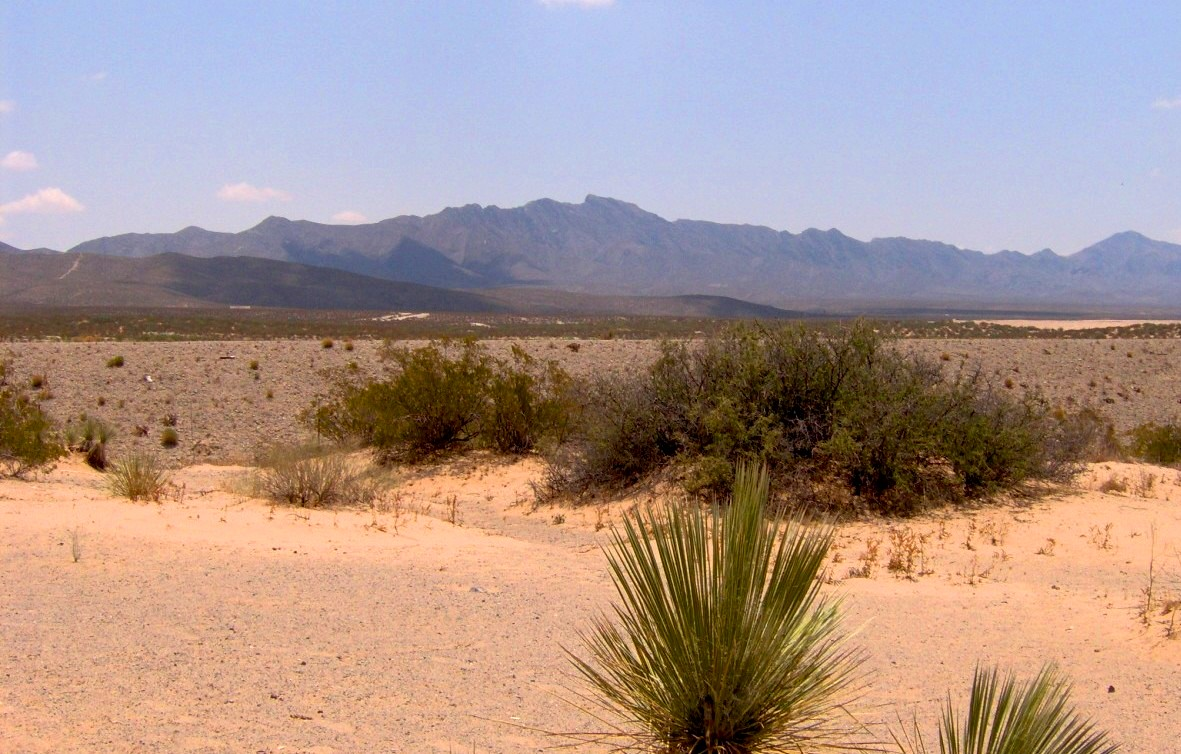
Chihuahuan Desert terrain on the valley floor south of Las Cruces

== History ==
=== Prehispanic ===
The Rio Grande Valley has been inhabited for millennia. The Folsom tradition first reached the Rio Grande Valley between 13,000 and 12,000 years ago near present-day Albuquerque. Following herds of bison across the West Mesa, they would frequent the valley for water, game, and wild plants. Artifacts left behind by the Folsom culture include flakes of stone cherts from the Chuska Mountains, the Zuni Mountains, and the Rio Puerco Escarpment, suggesting they were moving east toward the Rio Grande, collecting high-quality stones along the way, and stopping to camp and kill game upon the mesa, before continuing west and south across the Americas.

The Ancestral Puebloans inhabited the valley year-around starting sometime before 1300 CE, after abandoning their settlements near the Four Corners region, probably due to drought, in the late Pueblo III Period. They established the various pueblos in the valley that are still inhabited today.

The Apache peoples entered the valley sometime between 1200 and 1500 CE; the Apaches' nomadic way of life complicates accurate dating, primarily because they constructed less substantial dwellings than other Southwestern groups. They were a primarily nomadic culture who would hunt and gather wild plants. They traded with the Pueblos their bison meat, hides, and stone tool materials for Puebloan maize and woven cotton goods. They would also raid Pueblo, and later Spanish, Mexican, and American, settlements. Since the early 21st century, substantial progress has been made in dating and distinguishing their dwellings and other forms of material culture.

=== Hispanic ===
In the autumn of 1540, a military expedition of the Viceroyalty of New Spain led by Francisco Vásquez de Coronado, Governor of Nueva Galicia, reached the Tiwa pueblos in the valley around the future site of the Albuquerque Metro. When they entered the valley to establish irrigated fields, they encountered fields already in place by the Pueblos, complete with diversions and canals "as if built by Spaniards".

El Camino Real de Tierra Adentro (English: The Royal Road of Interior Land) was established in 1600 to connect Mexico City with the capital of the kingdom of Santa Fe de Nuevo México. The road first entered the valley at El Paso del Norte (present day Ciudad Juárez, Chihuahua). North of Las Cruces, New Mexico, the road left the valley and traversed the Jornada del Muerto Desert. The road then rejoined the valley at Socorro and followed along the floor of the valley to near Kewa Pueblo, where it again left the valley on the final leg to Santa Fe, New Mexico.

La Villa de Alburquerque was founded by Nuevo México governor Francisco Cuervo y Valdés in 1706. It was built in the style of a typical Spanish villa, with buildings surrounding a central plaza. The area was an important crossing in the valley since ancient times. Here, a good ford of the river lined with the path to an important mountain pass

=== Post-Hispanic ===
Between 1591 and 1942, 82 floods with flows greater than 10,000 cubic feet per second of flow were recorded. Flooding resulted from seasonal meltwater from snow in the northern mountains in the spring, and from storm runoff during the New Mexican Monsoon in the summer. The Spanish noted that Pueblos living along the river would often build on raised land or natural highpoints along the valley floor; rarely, they would abandon settlements if the flooding was too frequent or severe in a particular location. An unnamed Spaniard in 1776 wrote of the floods in the Rio Grande Valley:

"This river is in flood from mid-April to the end of June. The force of the freshets depends upon whether the winter snows have been heavy or light, but they never fail, for it always snows more or less. In a very rainy year, the flood sea-son lasts a long time, and the longer it lasts, the greater the damage it does, whether to people or cattle who are drowned, or to farmlands that are swept away, or even to nearby houses that are carried off."

The largest flood occurred in 1828 and exceeded 100,000 cfs. Records indicate that the entire valley was flooded from Albuquerque to El Paso, which caused the river to shift to new channels in several locations. Several settlements in the Albuquerque area were moved due to flooding, such as Alameda and "Upper Bernalillo". Near Albuquerque, the river would alternate during floods between a channel near present-day 2nd and 4th Streets NW east of town, and the present-day channel west of town; this ended when the river was channelized in the city in the 1950s.

The construction of Elephant Butte Dam and Cochiti Dam in the 20th century virtually ended the era of unpredictable and destructive flooding in the middle Rio Grande Valley. This has led to issues in the valley such as falling water tables, decreased fertility due to reduction in silt deposition, decrease in cottonwood saplings due to competitive vegetation surviving flood season, and endangerment of certain aquatic species due to decreased intensity of spring flood pulses, which typically cues spawning in such species.

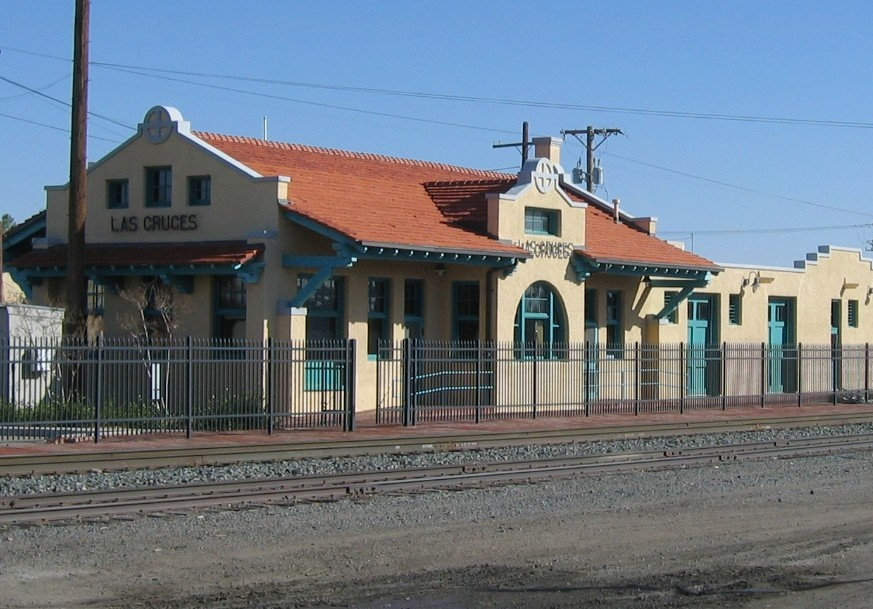
Santa Fe rail station in Las Cruces

When the Atchison, Topeka and Santa Fe Railroad arrived in Albuquerque 1880, it bypassed the Plaza, locating the passenger depot and railyards about 2 miles (3 km) east in what quickly became known as "New Albuquerque" or "New Town". A new line, the El Paso Subdivision, was built from New Albuquerque, 230 miles (370 km) south to El Paso, Texas. The northern and southern sections of the route traverses the Rio Grande Valley, while the central section bypasses the valley and crosses the Jornada del Muerto Desert, very roughly parallel to the Camino Real. The line is still active as of 2021, but is only moderately used. The entire line from Belen to El Paso is unsignalized dark territory.

In the 1926, U.S. 66 was constructed through the New Mexico. The highway entered the valley at Kewa Pueblo. It then continued south through the valley through the Albuquerque area to Los Lunas, where the highway left the valley to continue west to California. U.S. 66 was rerouted on a more east–west path to cross the valley at Albuquerque in 1937. U.S. Route 85, part of the Pan-American Highway, was constructed along the length of the valley from El Paso, Texas to then-US 66 (now NM 6) in Los Lunas. It was shown as "U.S. Route 466" in an early 1925 plan for the United States Numbered Highway System. The number "466" was later used along another routing.

== Agriculture ==
Repeated floods in the middle Rio Grande Valley have created some of the most fertile agricultural lands in the Southwest. The Puebloans were the first to grow crops in the valley, growing maize, squash, and beans. The Spanish later expanded irrigation to almost every arable acre of floodland along the Rio Grande.

The valley is famous for growing chile peppers; the village of Hatch bills itself as "The Chile Capital of the World". The mix of desert minerals with clays and other alluvium carried south by the floods have created a unique terroir, resulting in peppers with unique flavors and uniform heat levels. It includes acreage for New Mexico's state vegetable, the New Mexico chile.

Other important crops include pecans, frijoles (pinto beans), peanuts, onions, and cotton. It is the location of Stahmann Farms, which operates the world's largest pecan orchard near Las Cruces. Livestock includes cattle, dairy, sheep, angora goats, pigs, chickens, turkeys, and honey bees.

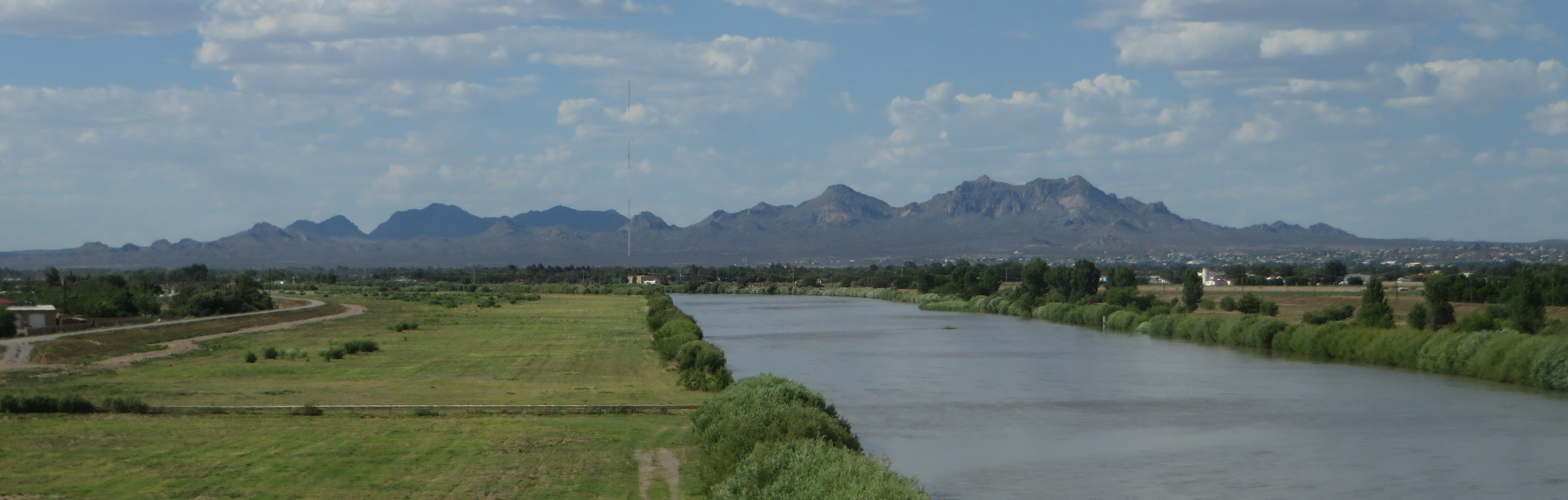
Fields in the Rio Grande Valley. The city of Las Cruces is on the right, and the Franklin Mountains of Texas are in the background.
