= Fort Hancock =

Fort Hancock may refer to:

- Fort Hancock, Texas, a census-designated place in Hudspeth County
- Fort Hancock, New Jersey, former fort on Sandy Hook
- Fort Hancock Formation, a geologic formation in Texas

== See also ==
- Fort Hancock U.S. Life Saving Station, near Highlands, New Jersey
