= Sierra Ladrones Formation =

Geologic formation in New Mexico, United States

- Stratigraphic range: Pleistocene to Pliocene; 5–2 Ma
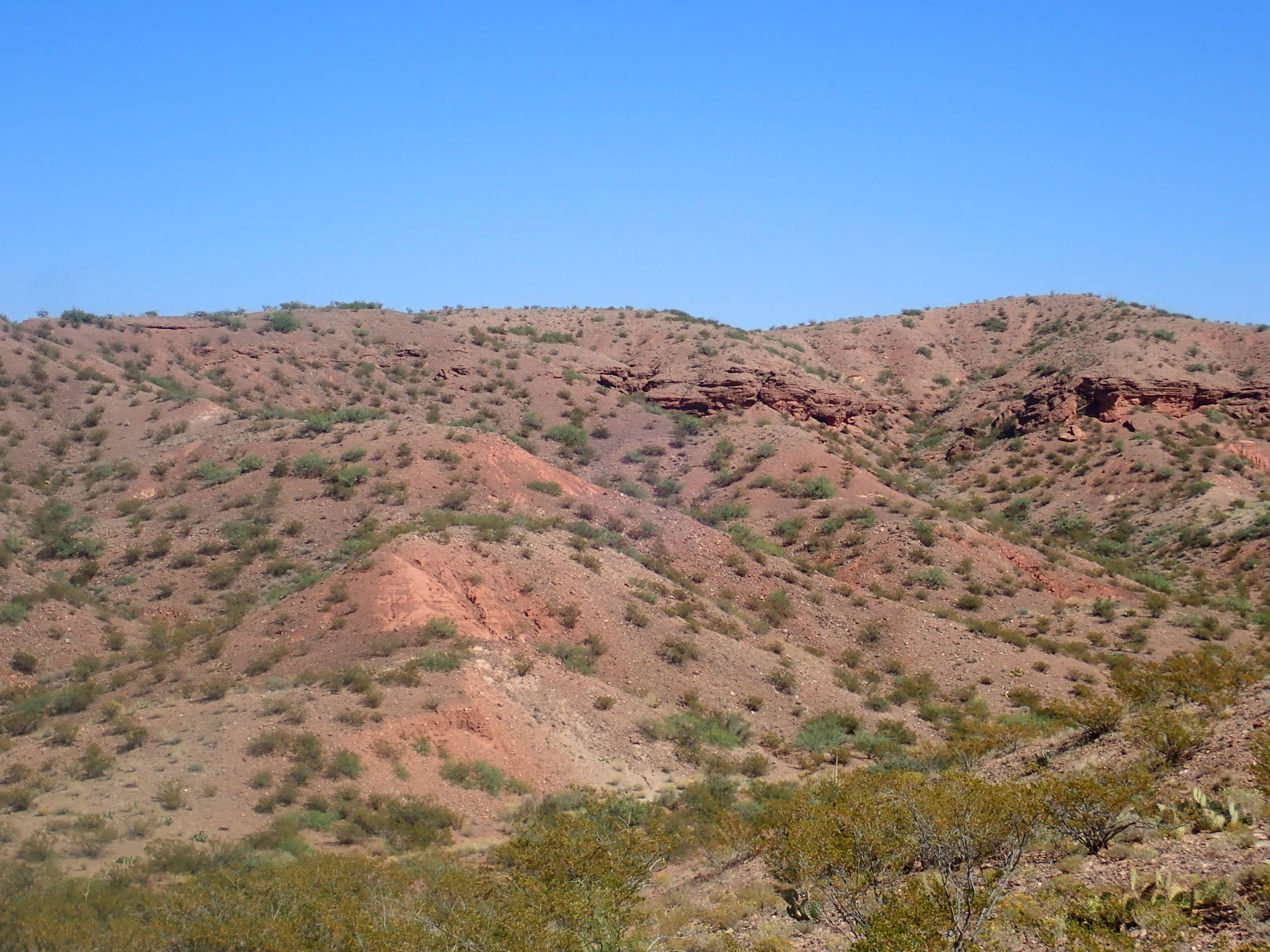
- Sierra Ladrones Formation northeast of Socorro, New Mexico, USA
- Type: Formation
- Unit of: Santa Fe Group
- Overlies: Popotosa Formation
- Thickness: 470 m (1,540 ft)

Lithology
- Primary: Sandstone
- Other: Siltstone, conglomerate

Location
- Coordinates: 34.3939496°N 107.0007996°W
- Region: New Mexico
- Country: United States

Type section
- Named for: Sierra Ladrones (mountain range)
- Named by: M.N. Machette
- Year defined: 1978; 47 years ago
- Sierra Ladrones Formation (the United States) Sierra Ladrones Formation (New Mexico)

The Sierra Ladrones Formation is a geologic formation exposed near the Rio Grande Valley in New Mexico. It preserves fossils of Pliocene to Pleistocene age.

== Description ==
The formation consists of three facies representing different depositional environments. These are piedmont slope and alluvial fan deposits, typically composed of light-brown to light-reddish-brown sandstone and fanglomerate; axial stream deposits, which are composed of light-gray to light-yellowish-brown fine- to medium-grained sand and sandstone with fluvial cross-bedding and cut-and-fill channels; and interbedded basalt flows with a K-Ar age of 4.5 +/-0.1 million years (Ma. The total thickness is in excess of 470 m (1,540 ft). The formation unconformably overlies or is in fault contact with the Popotosa Formation or older formations. Its age is early Pliocene to middle Pleistocene (2 Ma to 5 Ma.)

The formation is interpreted as fanglomerates shed from the flanking uplifts of the Rio Grande Rift and channel and floodplain deposits of the ancestral Rio Grande.

== Fossils ==
The formation has yielded abundant fossils of Irvingtonian age at Tijeras Arroyo, south of Albuquerque International Airport. These include Hypolagus, Equus, Mammuthus, and Hesperotestudo.

== History of investigation ==
The formation was defined by M.N. Machette in 1978 for exposures in the Sierra Ladrones, a range of low foothills of the Ladron Mountains, in the Sevilleta National Wildlife Refuge.

The formation was subsequently mapped into the lower Rio Puerco valley and as far north as the Santo Domingo basin.

== See also ==
- List of fossiliferous stratigraphic units in New Mexico
- Paleontology in New Mexico
