= Ancha Formation =

Geologic formation near Santa Fe, New Mexico

- Stratigraphic range: Pleistocene, 3.5–1 Ma
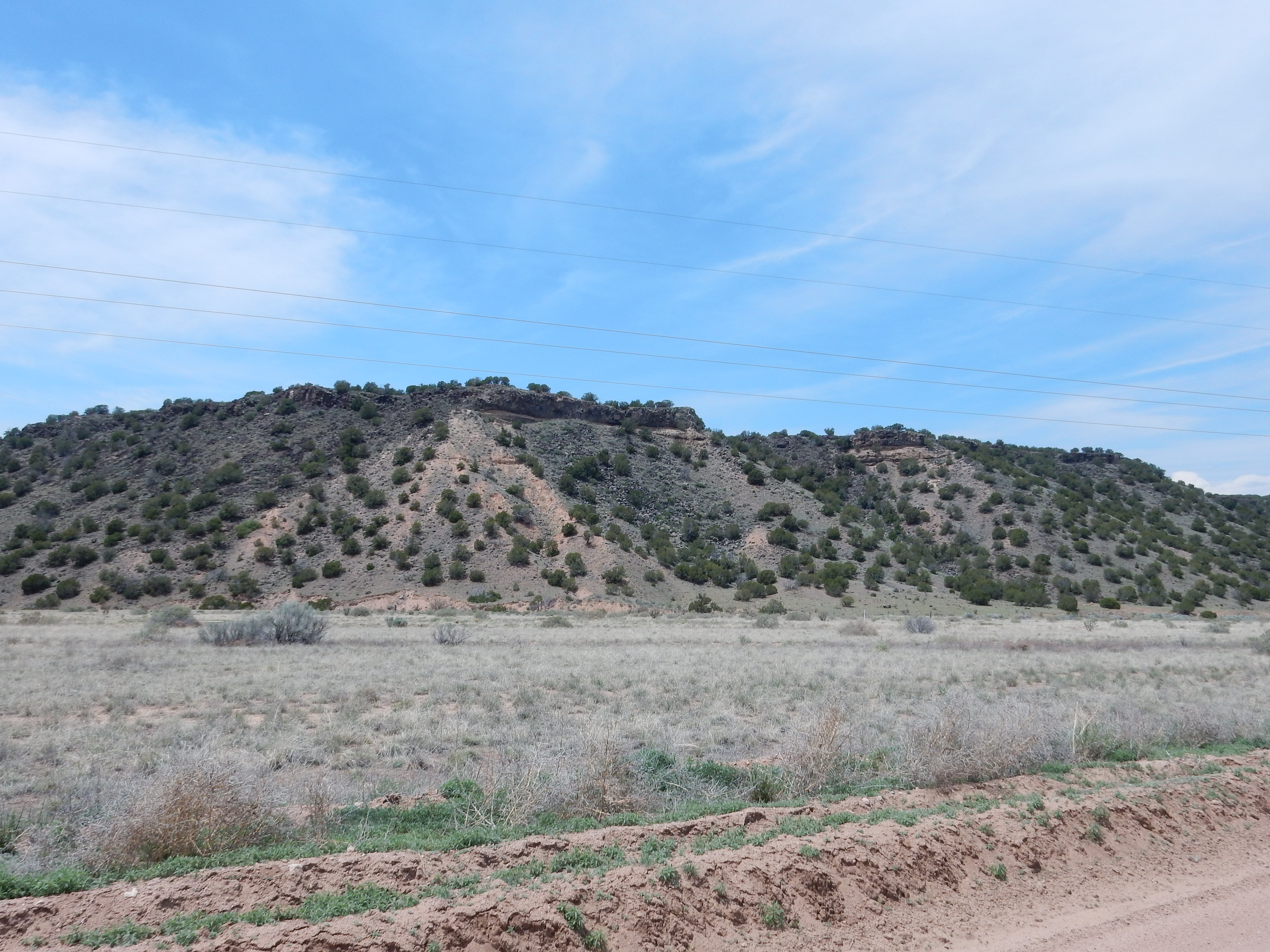
- Ancha Formation at type section
- Type: Formation
- Unit of: Santa Fe Group
- Overlies: Tesuque Formation
- Thickness: 28 m (92 ft)

Lithology
- Primary: Sandstone
- Other: Siltstone, conglomerate

Location
- Coordinates: 35.74834°N 106.11108°W
- Region: New Mexico
- Country: United States

Type section
- Named for: Canada Ancha
- Named by: Baltz et al.
- Year defined: 1952
- Ancha Formation (the United States) Ancha Formation (New Mexico)

The Ancha Formation is a geologic formation found near Santa Fe, New Mexico. It is estimated to be between 1 and 3 million years in age, corresponding to the late Pliocene and Pleistocene.

Study of the formation has provided clues on the development of rivers systems in the region. In particular, evidence from the formation suggests that the Pecos River may originally have flowed west to join the Santa Fe River, rather than east to join the Rio Grande as it now does.

The formation is one of the youngest of the Santa Fe Group formations deposited in the Rio Grande rift. It is an important local aquifer.

== Description ==
The Ancha Formation is mostly granitic gravel and sand with some mudstone, derived from the southwestern flank of the Sangre de Cristo Mountains. It is interpreted as a streamflow-dominated piedmont unit. The formation is estimated to be 90 m (300 ft) thick based on seismic refraction studies.

The age is constrained by an ash bed from the Jemez Mountains near the top of the formation, dated via argon-argon dating to 1.48 ± 0.02 Ma, and an inset fluvial deposit dated to 1.25 ± 0.06 Ma. Some portions of the formation may have continued accumulating sediments from mountain front canyons east of Santa Fe into the late Pleistocene. The base of the formation is thought to vary in age from ~2.7–3.5(?) Ma in the western Santa Fe embayment to ~1.6 Ma near the Sangre de Cristo Mountains.

The formation correlates with Pliocene–early Pleistocene aggradation in the Española and Albuquerque Basins, suggesting a regional climate influence on deposition in the uppermost Santa Fe Group. The good preservation of the Ancha Formation relative to piedmont regions to the south and eroded upland regions to the north suggests that late Pliocene volcanism and tectonism may have provided accommodation space.

The Ancha Formation was likely deposited in the Santa Fe area by the Santa Fe River and other large streams. However, it contains clasts of rock unlike that of the southwestern Sangre de Cristo Mountains, suggesting that the Pecos River originally drained into the Santa Fe River watershed.

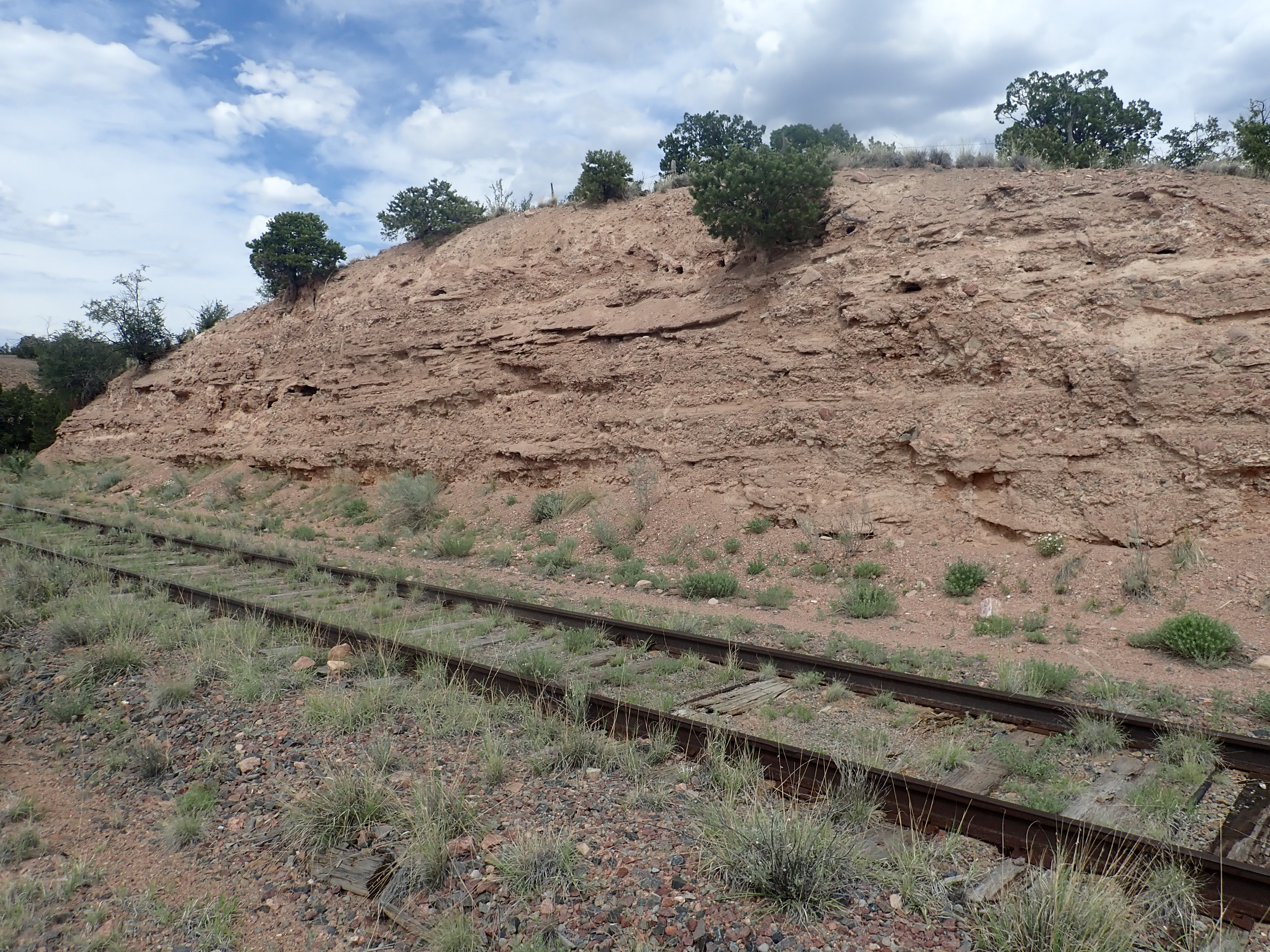
Ancha Formation at reference section south-southeast of Santa Fe.

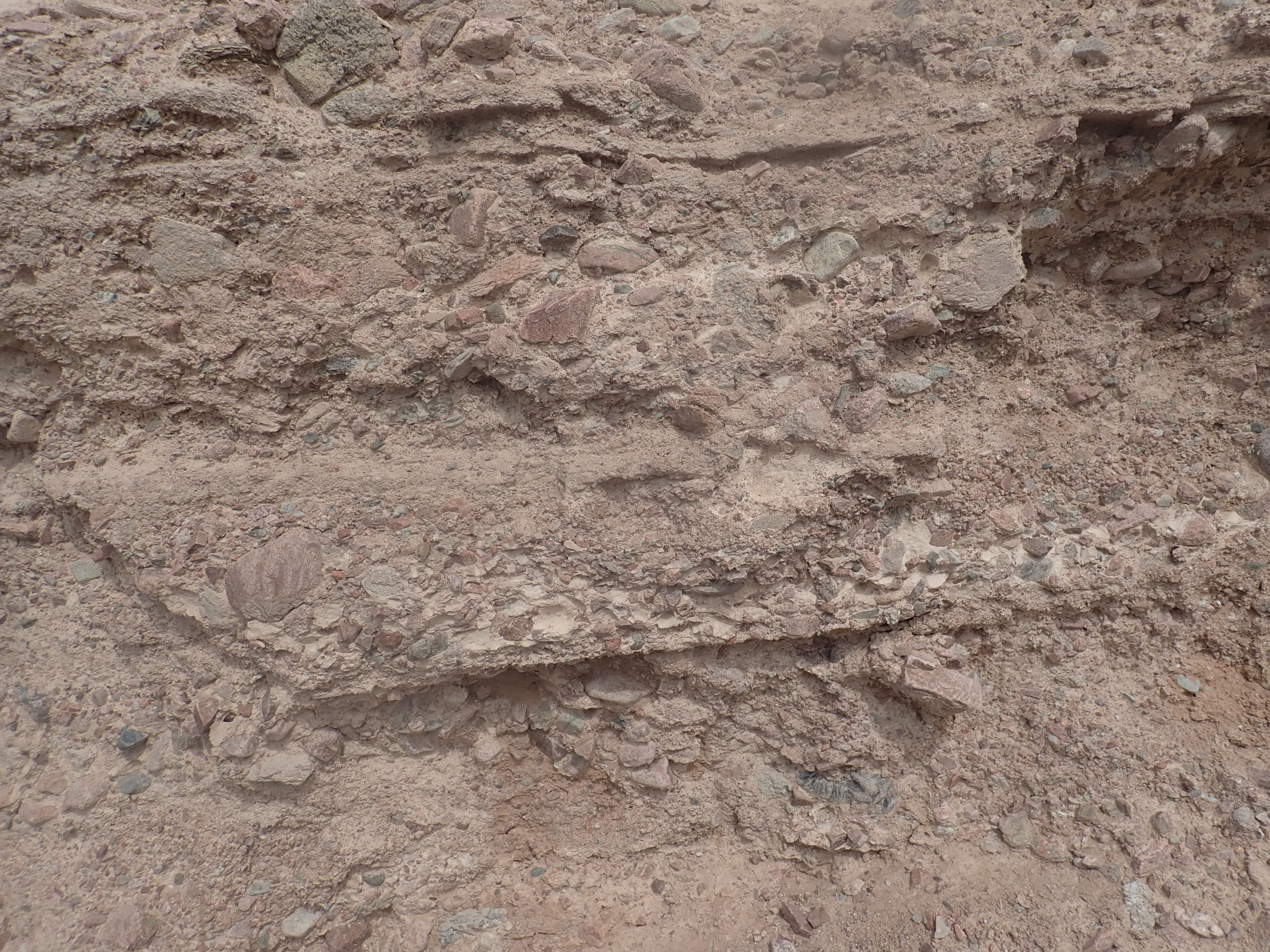
Close view of Ancha Formation at reference section.

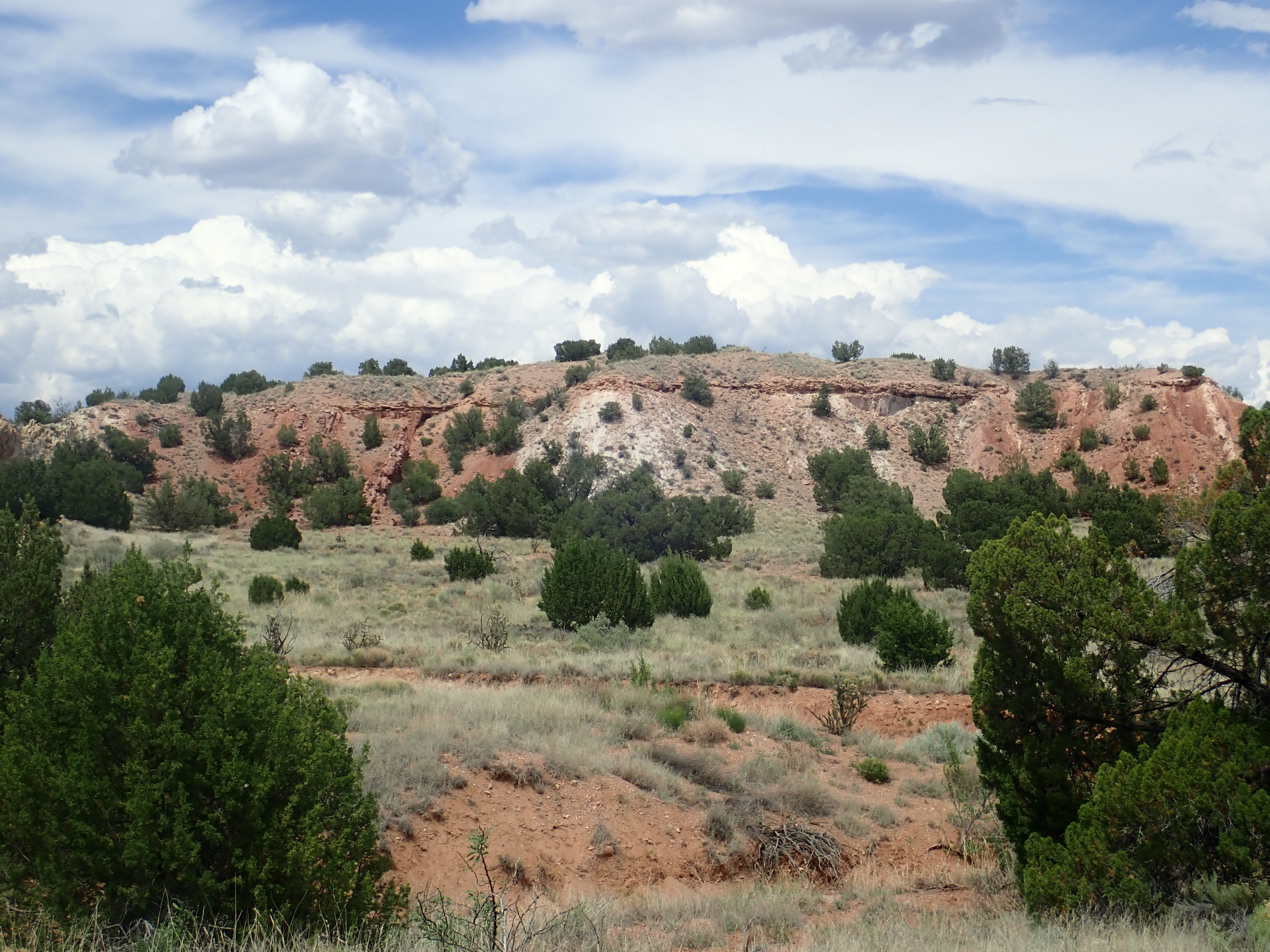
Horizontal Ancha Formation beds resting on nearly vertical Galisteo Formation beds.

== Natural resources ==
The Ancha Formation is a thin (less than 45 m (148 ft) saturated thickness) but locally important aquifer for domestic wells south of Santa Fe. Its porosity is much greater than the underlying beds of the Tesuque Formation.

== History of investigation ==
Zane Spiegel and Brewster Baldwin formally named the formation and designated a type section in 1963, but the name seems to have been used informally as early as 1952. The formation is named for exposures around Canada Ancha (35.826°N 106.157°W), a drainage that follows the northwest escarpment of the Cerros del Rio to join the Rio Grande.

Koning and coinvestigators redefined the formation in 2002 and designated four additional reference sections to supplement the poorly exposed type section. Their definition removed the lower beds at the type section from the formation and reassigned them to the underlying Tesuque Formation.
