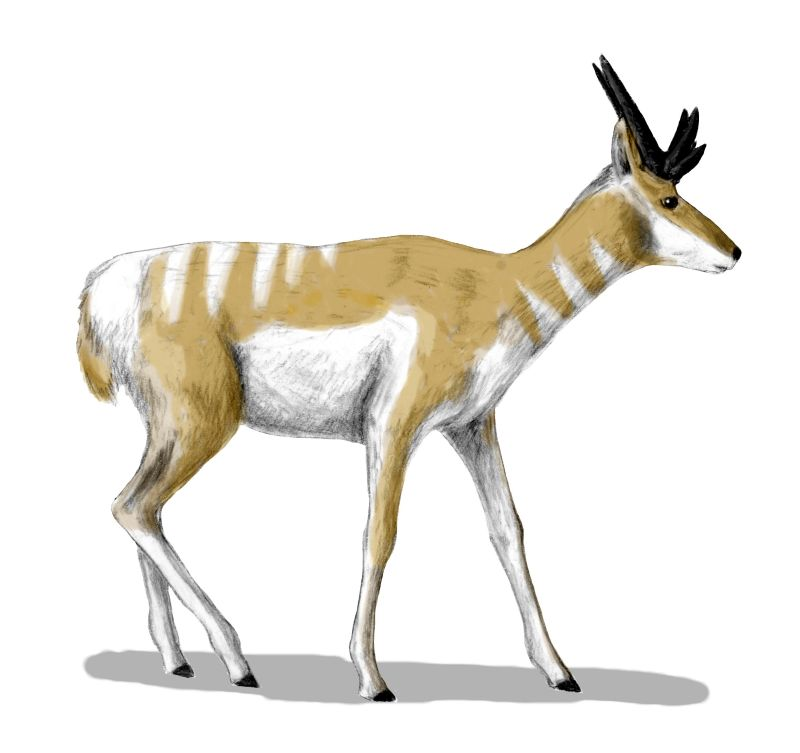
- Osbornoceros osborni

Scientific classification
- Kingdom: Animalia
- Phylum: Chordata
- Class: Mammalia
- Infraclass: Placentalia
- Order: Artiodactyla
- Family: Antilocapridae
- Genus: †Osbornoceros; Frick, 1937
- Species: †O. osborni

Binomial name
- †Osbornoceros osborni Frick, 1937

= Osbornoceros =

Osbornoceros Temporal range: Late Miocene

Extinct genus of mammals

Osbornoceros is an extinct artiodactyl genus of the family Antilocapridae. All antilocaprid species are extinct except for the pronghorn. Osbornoceros osborni is the only known species of the genus Osbornoceros. Osbornoceros lived during the Late Miocene around 7 to 6 million years ago in what is now North America. It is well represented in fossil discoveries, with nearly a dozen specimens having been found to date. All come from the Chamita Formation in a quarry near Lyden, New Mexico, the site of numerous other finds such as that of Chamitataxus, a prehistoric badger that lived at the same time. The holotype specimen of Osbornoceros was discovered in 1937 and many more were found nearby during further expeditions.

Osbornoceros was strikingly similar to today's pronghorn; it was lightly built and had a series of small horns that protruded from its skull. It was, like its relatives, a quadruped herbivore and grazed on the grassy plains of its time. If Osbornoceros had any predators is unknown and much is still unknown about its palaeobiology, but it is assumed to have been similar to the pronghorn and its extinct relatives.

== Palaeoecology ==
A paired dental mesowear and microwear study found that early Hemphillian O. osborni had a more abrasive diet than even the merycodontines with the most abrasive diets, but that it still exhibited patterns of seasonal or regional mixed feeding and was not an obligate grazer.
