= Santa Fe Group (geology) =

Group of geologic formations filling the Rio Grande rift

- Stratigraphic range: Oligocene to Pleistocene, 26–1 Ma
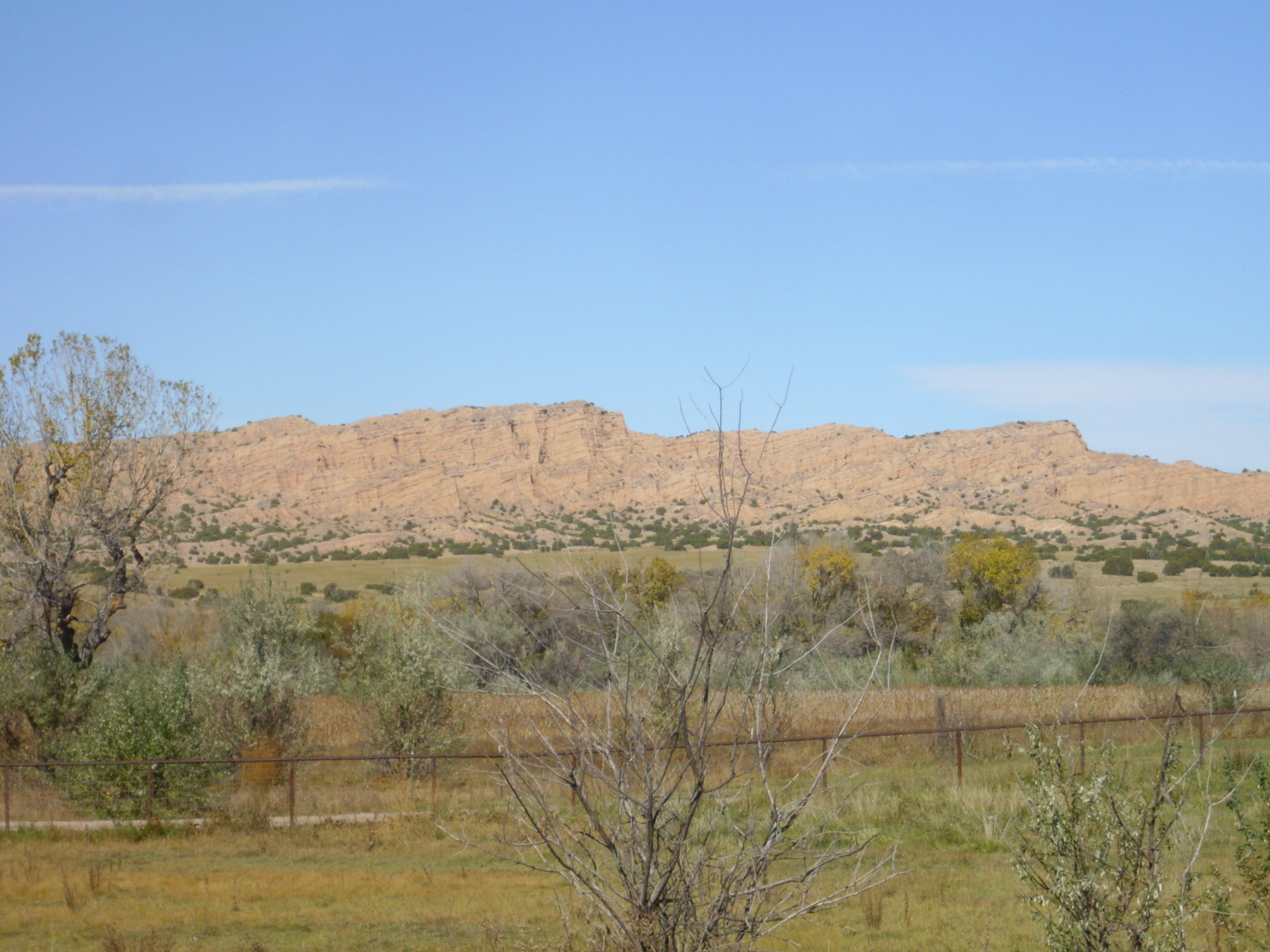
- Los Barrancos, New Mexico, underlain by Santa Fe Group beds
- Type: Group
- Sub-units: See text
- Overlies: Espinaso Formation
- Thickness: 5,000 m (16,000 ft)

Lithology
- Primary: Siltstone
- Other: Sandstone, conglomerate

Location
- Region: New Mexico; Colorado
- Country: United States
- Extent: Rio Grande rift

Type section
- Named for: Santa Fe, New Mexico
- Named by: Hayden
- Year defined: 1869
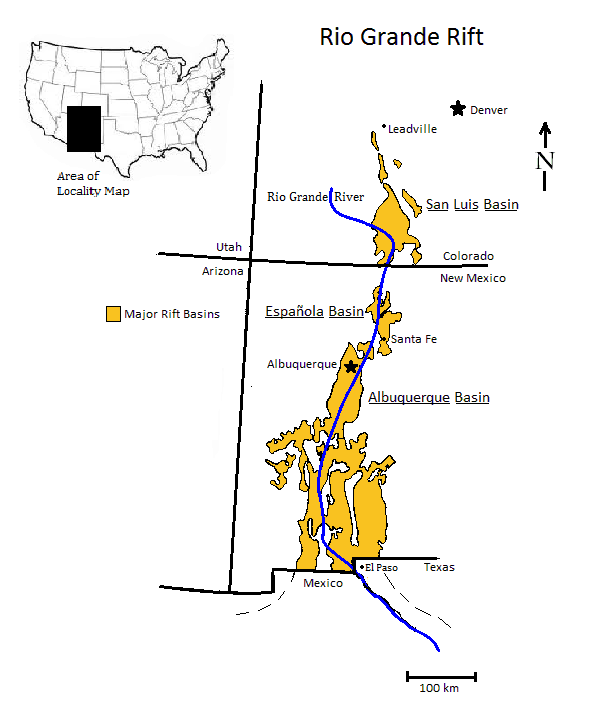

The Santa Fe Group is a group of geologic formations in New Mexico and Colorado. It contains fossils characteristic of the Oligocene through Pleistocene epochs. The group consists of basin-filling sedimentary and volcanic rocks of the Rio Grande rift, and contains important regional aquifers.

== Description ==
The Santa Fe Group is widely defined as basin-filling sedimentary and volcanic rocks of the Rio Grande rift. These range in age from late Oligocene to Pleistocene. The oldest formations in the group correspond to the earliest structural deformation associated with rifting. Geologic uplift of the region around the rift has ended deposition, and erosion in the Rio Grande river system has exposed many of the beds deposited earlier, often spectacularly, as in the badlands north of Santa Fe.

The formations in the group are divided into lower and upper sections. The lower Santa Fe Group was deposited in bolsons (closed arid basins) where streams drained into intermittent playa lakes surrounded by piedmont deposits eroded from basin-margin uplifts. The upper Santa Fe Group was deposited after integration of these basins into the ancestral Rio Grande, so that their drainage flowed toward southern New Mexico. Some geologists also define a middle section transitional between the upper and lower sections.

== Formations ==
Formations of the Santa Fe Group are defined in each basin of the Rio Grande rift, though some formations extend across multiple basins.

=== San Luis Basin ===
Upper Santa Fe Group:

- Alamosa Formation

The lower Santa Fe Group is present only in the subsurface in the San Luis Basin and has not been divided into formations.

=== Espanola Basin ===
Upper Santa Fe Group:

- Ancha Formation
- Puye Formation
- Cochiti Formation

Lower Santa Fe Group:

- Chamita Formation
- Tesuque Formation
- Abiquiu Formation

=== Hagen Basin ===
Upper Santa Fe Group:

- Tuerto Formation

Lower Santa Fe Group:

- Blackshare Formation
- Tanos Formation

=== Northwest Albuquerque Basin ===
Upper Santa Fe Group:

- Sierra Ladrones Formation
- Cochiti Formation
- Ceja Formation
- Arroyo Ojito Formation

Middle Santa Fe Group:

- Cerro Conejo Formation

Lower Santa Fe Group:

- Zia Formation

=== Southern and eastern Albuquerque Basin ===
Upper Santa Fe Group:

- Sierra Ladrones Formation

Lower Santa Fe Group:

- Popotosa Formation

=== Orogrande Basin ===
Upper Santa Fe Group:

- Camp Rice Formation
- Palomas Formation

Lower Santa Fe Group:

- Rincon Valley Formation
- Hayner Ranch Formation

== Fossils ==
G.K. Gilbert visited San Ildefonso Pueblo with the Hayden Survey in 1873 and found fossil mammal bones characteristic of the Pliocene. Some of these were sent to Othniel Marsh. Marsh's bitter rival, Edward Drinker Cope, arrived at San Ildefonso the next year and collected a number of Miocene reptile, bird, and mammal fossils.

Childs Frick sent an expedition into the Tesuque area in 1924, and immediately recognized the paleontological potential of the Santa Fe beds. The Fricks Laboratory (merged with the Department of Vertebrate Paleontology of the American Museum of Natural History in 1968) carried out field work through 1972. Work prior to 1940 was careless about identifying exact source strata, though greater care was taken thereafter. Most of the fossils came from the Pojoaque Member of the Tesuque Formation and were almost entire found within thin (0.5–3 m) maroon-red to pale green claystone to fine-grained siltstone beds of lithosome B. These are interpreted as small lacustrine deposits.

Fossils found in the Santa Fe Group include the hemicyonid Hemicyon and the borophagine canid Carpocyon webbi, the antilocaprids Cosoryx, Merycodus, and Ramoceros, chiroptera from the Vespertilionidae and Antrozoinae, the turtle Glyptemys valentinensis, and mastodonts.

== Economic geology ==
The groundwater potential of the Santa Fe Group was recognized by Bryan Kirk in 1938, and the Alamosa subbasin of the San Luis Valley, the central part of the Albuquerque Basin, and the southern Mesilla basin from Las Cruces to El Paso are now among the most productive groundwater reservoirs in the western United States. In the Albuquerque area, this has produced significant drawdown of the water table, in some places exceeding 100 feet (30 m). The aquifer continues to be studied to characterize the effects of new development, and resulting shifts in groundwater flow, on pollutants in the aquifer.

== History of investigation ==
Hayden gave the name "Santa Fe Marls" to the extensive sedimentary beds in the valley of the Rio Grande near Santa Fe during his 1869 survey of New Mexico and Colorado. He likened these to the badlands of South Dakota and correctly determined that they were upper Tertiary in age and were much younger than the Galisteo Formation beds which they overlie. He noted their great thickness, which he observed to be at least 1,500 feet (460 m).

By 1936, the Santa Fe Formation had been traced from central New Mexico into southern Colorado. Two years later, Bryan recognized that it extended at least from the San Luis Basin to beyond El Paso and was extensively faulted and deformed. He interpreted the formation as being deposited in a series of basins along an ancestral Rio Grande. The formation was promoted to group rank in 1953 and defined by Baldwin three years later as basin-filling sedimentary and volcanic rocks of the Rio Grande rift.

Galusha and Blick advocated a much narrower definition of the Santa Fe Group in 1971. They restricted it to the Tesuque Formation and Chamita Formation in the Espanola basin, and specifically excluded the older Abiquiu and Zia Formation and younger Ancha Formation. However, the broad 1956 definition by Baldwin has been widely accepted.
