= Tesuque Formation =

Geologic formation in New Mexico, United States

- Stratigraphic range: Miocene, 25.6–12.4 Ma
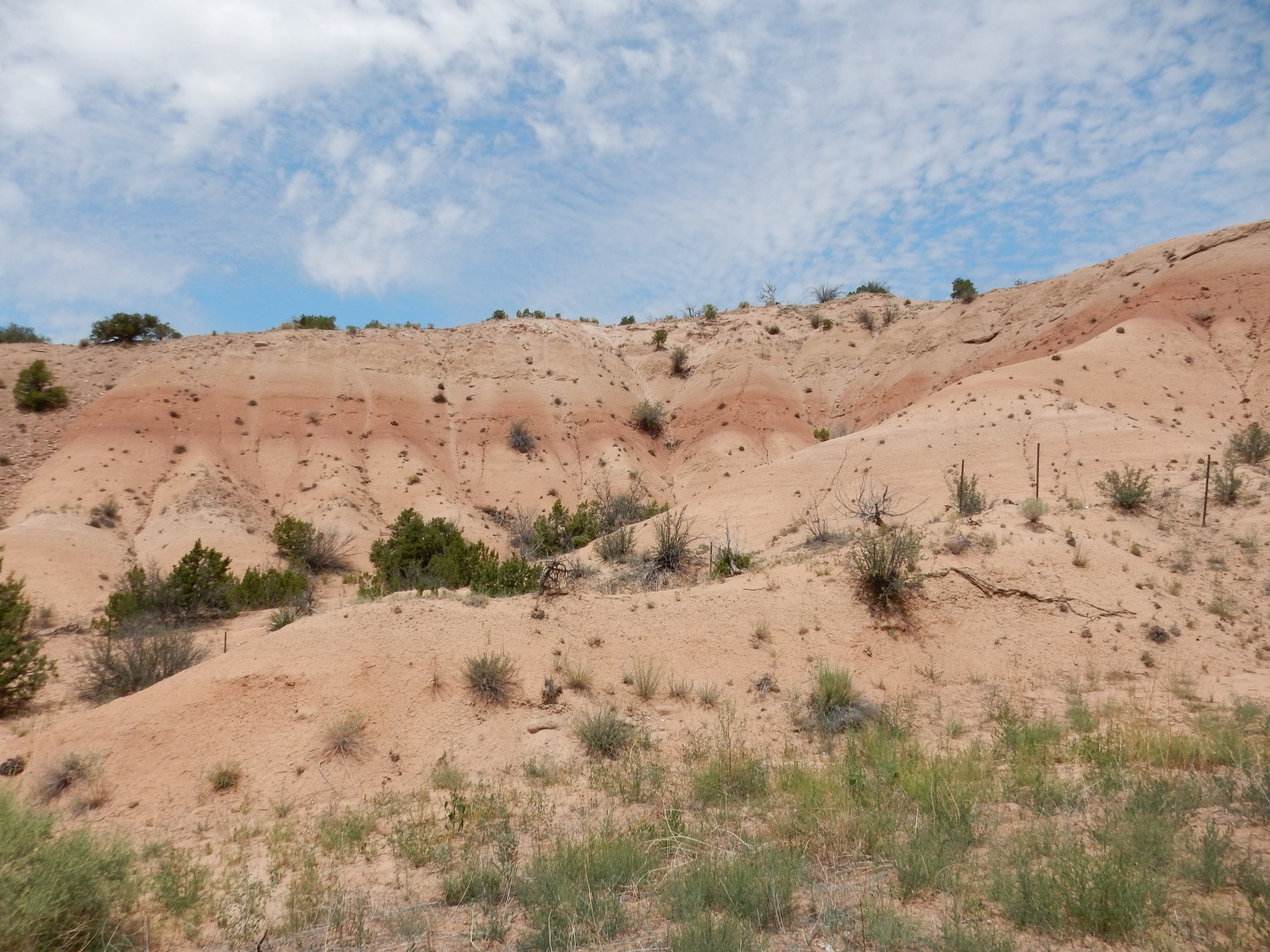
- Tesuque Formation at its type area, Tesuque, New Mexico. This is the Nambe Member.
- Type: Formation
- Unit of: Santa Fe Group
- Sub-units: See text
- Underlies: Chamita Formation, Ancha Formation
- Overlies: Espinaso Formation, Abiquiu Formation
- Thickness: 2,100 m (6,900 ft)

Lithology
- Primary: Siltstone
- Other: Sandstone, conglomerate

Location
- Coordinates: 35°44′46″N 105°55′20″W
- Region: New Mexico
- Country: United States

Type section
- Named for: Tesuque, New Mexico
- Named by: Brewster Baldwin
- Year defined: 1956
- Tesuque Formation (the United States) Tesuque Formation (New Mexico)

The Tesuque Formation is a geologic formation in north-central New Mexico, United States. The formation provides an unusually complete record of the evolution of mammals during the Miocene epoch.

== Description ==
The formation is primarily siltstone and fine sandstone, with some boulder conglomerate beds in its eastern exposures close to the Sangre de Cristo Mountains. It is interpreted as coalesced alluvial fans with highly variable lithology. There is significant crossbedding and lenticular bedding, and some sandstone beds are well cemented with calcite. The formation dips 10 degrees to the west. Faulting makes an accurate estimate of its thickness uncertain, and it was originally estimated to be over 2,000 meters (6,600 feet) thick. However, a careful reconstruction taking into account faults gives a thickness of 1,370–1,460 meters (4,490–4,790 feet).

The Nambe Member is pinkish to reddish coarse-grained alluvial fan deposits resting on basement rock of the Sangre de Cristo Mountains. The member is named for Nambé Pueblo and has a total thickness of about 125 meters (410 feet). An ash bed within the member has an aged based on Ar-Ar dating of 25.52 ± 0.07 million years (Ma). Its age range is estimated to be from 25.6 to 16.1 Ma.

The Skull Ridge Member is separated from the Nambe Member by a distinctive ash bed. The member has numerous other ash beds, which result in relatively strong cementing that makes this a cliff-forming member. The upper portion is much less resistant to erosion. The member is up to 230 meters (750 feet) thick. Galusha and Blick did not identify the geographical location for which the member was named, and the place name "Skull Ridge" is unknown in New Mexico. An ash bed in the Skull Ridge Member has an Ar-Ar age of 15.45±0.06 Ma.

The Pojoaque Member is separated from the Skull Ridge Member by a greenish-gray conglomerate bed interpreted as lag gravel on an erosional surface. It is named for the Pojoaque Bluffs, also known as Los Barrancos, near the town of Pojoaque, New Mexico. The formation disappears into the subsurface under the Rio Grande River floodplain but is at least 550 meters (1,800 feet) thick. Its age range is estimated to be from 14.9 to 12.5 Ma.

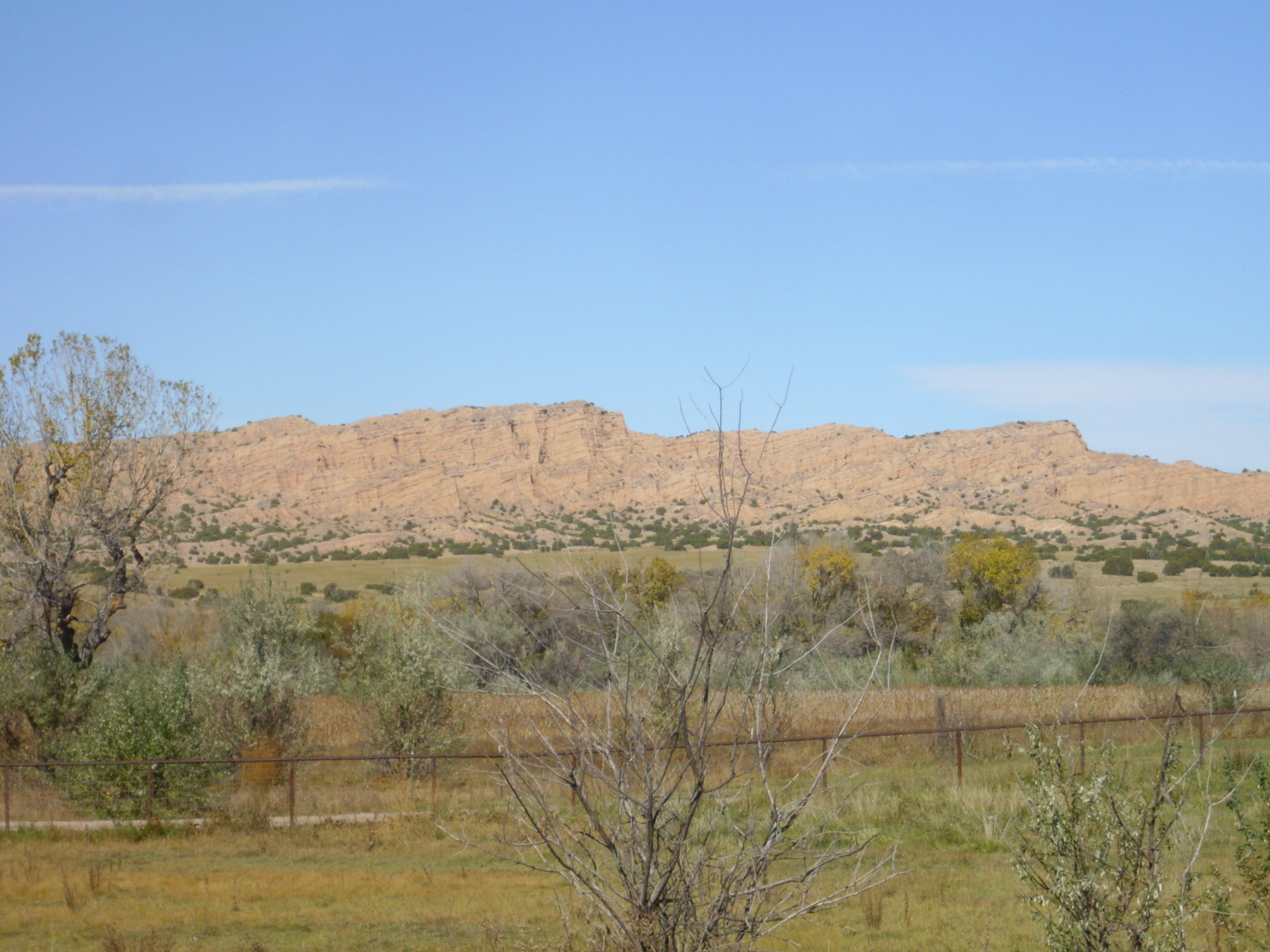
Pojoaque Member at Los Barrancos

The Chama-El Rito Member is found only in the northwestern portion of the Espanola Basin. It correlates with the Skull Ridge and Pojoaque Members, but contains conglomerate lenses with distinctive volcanic clasts (rock fragments) likely derived from the San Juan volcanic field.

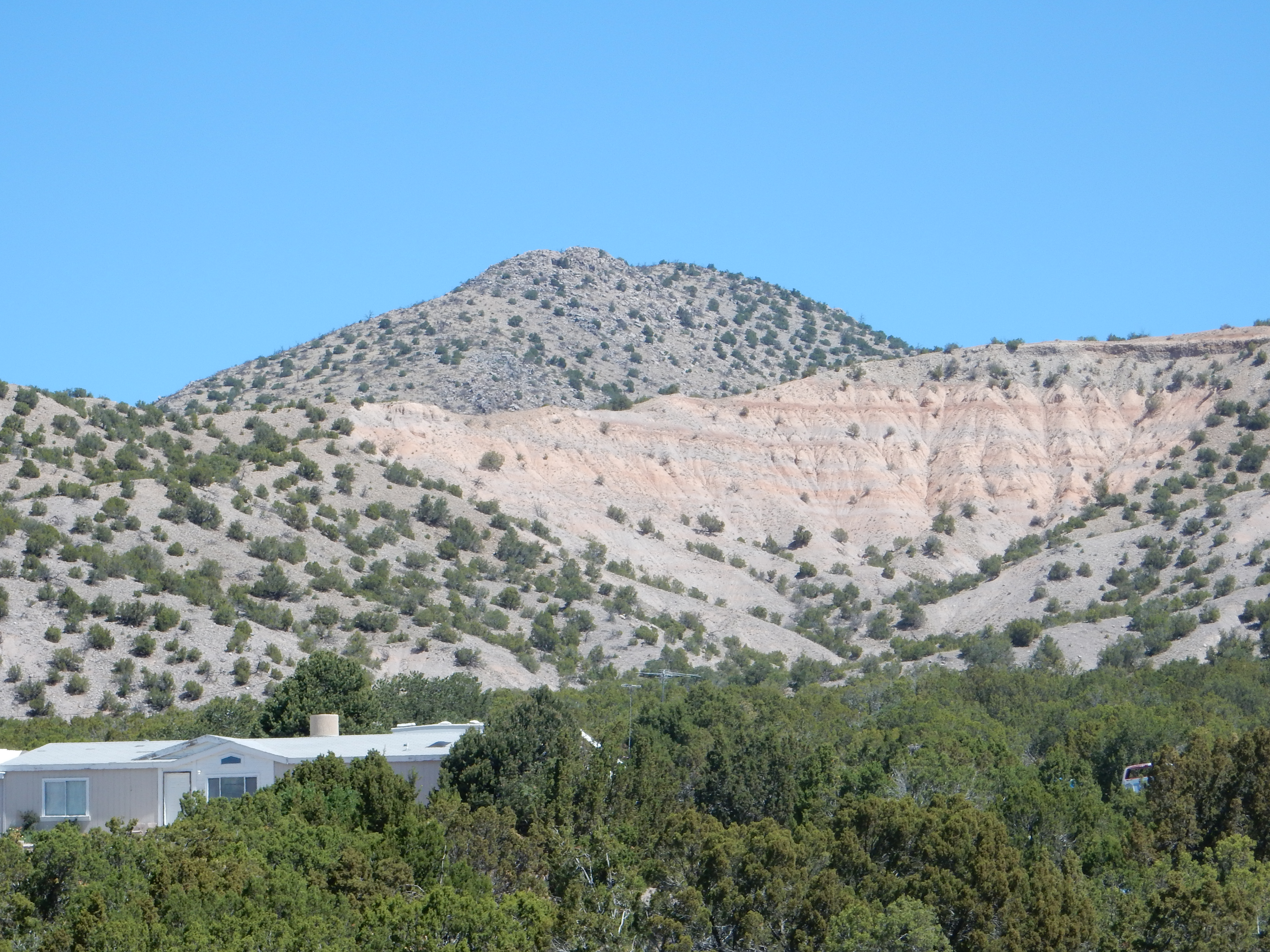
Chama-El Rito Member north of Mesa Vista School

The Ojo Caliente Member is 140 meters (460 feet) of soft eolian sandstone overlying the Chama-El Rito member. It is named for the village of Ojo Caliente. Radiometric dating of ash beds suggests the base of the member has a maximum age of 13.5 to 13.3 Ma.

The Cuarteles Member is found in the northeastern part of the Espanola Basin. It was originally defined in the Chamita Formation west of the Rio Grande, but is assigned to the Tesuque Formation east of the Rio Grande.

The Cejita Member is found in the northeastern part of the Espanola Basin, where it overlies the Cuarteles member. It is interbedded conglomerate and sandstone. It is probably similar in age to the Skull Ridge and Pojoaque Members.

In addition to the traditional lithostratigraphic units, the Tesuque Formation is divided into two lithosomes. Lithosome A is granitic material deposited by a network of westward-flowing streams off the Sangre de Cristo Mountains. Lithosome B is richer in clay and Paleozoic clasts and was deposited by south- to southwest-flowing rivers coming from the Penasco area. The two can be distinguished in the field by the redder coloration of Lithosome A compared with the tan to gray color of Lithosome B.

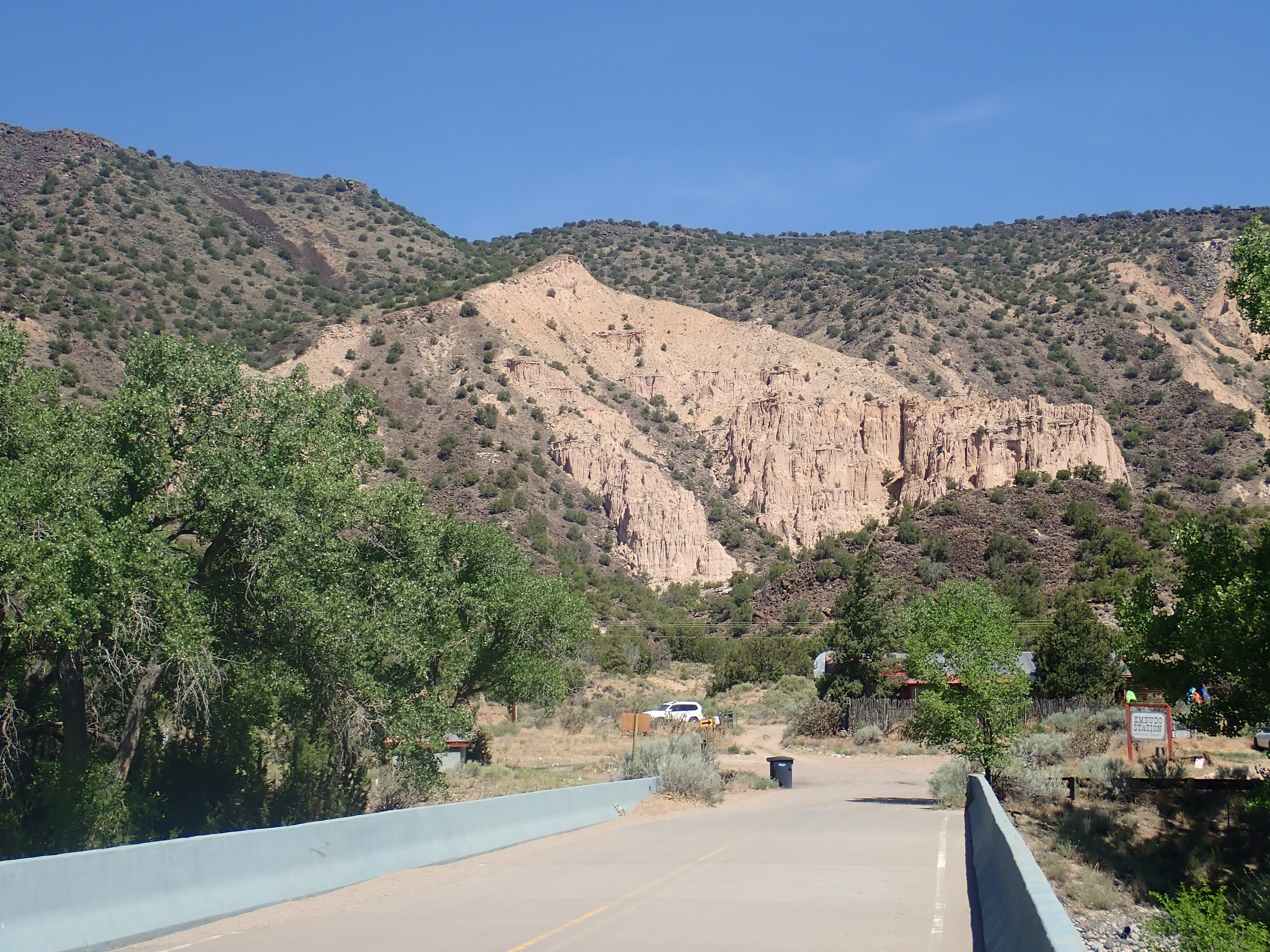
Ojo Caliente Member of the Tesuque Formation at Embudo Station

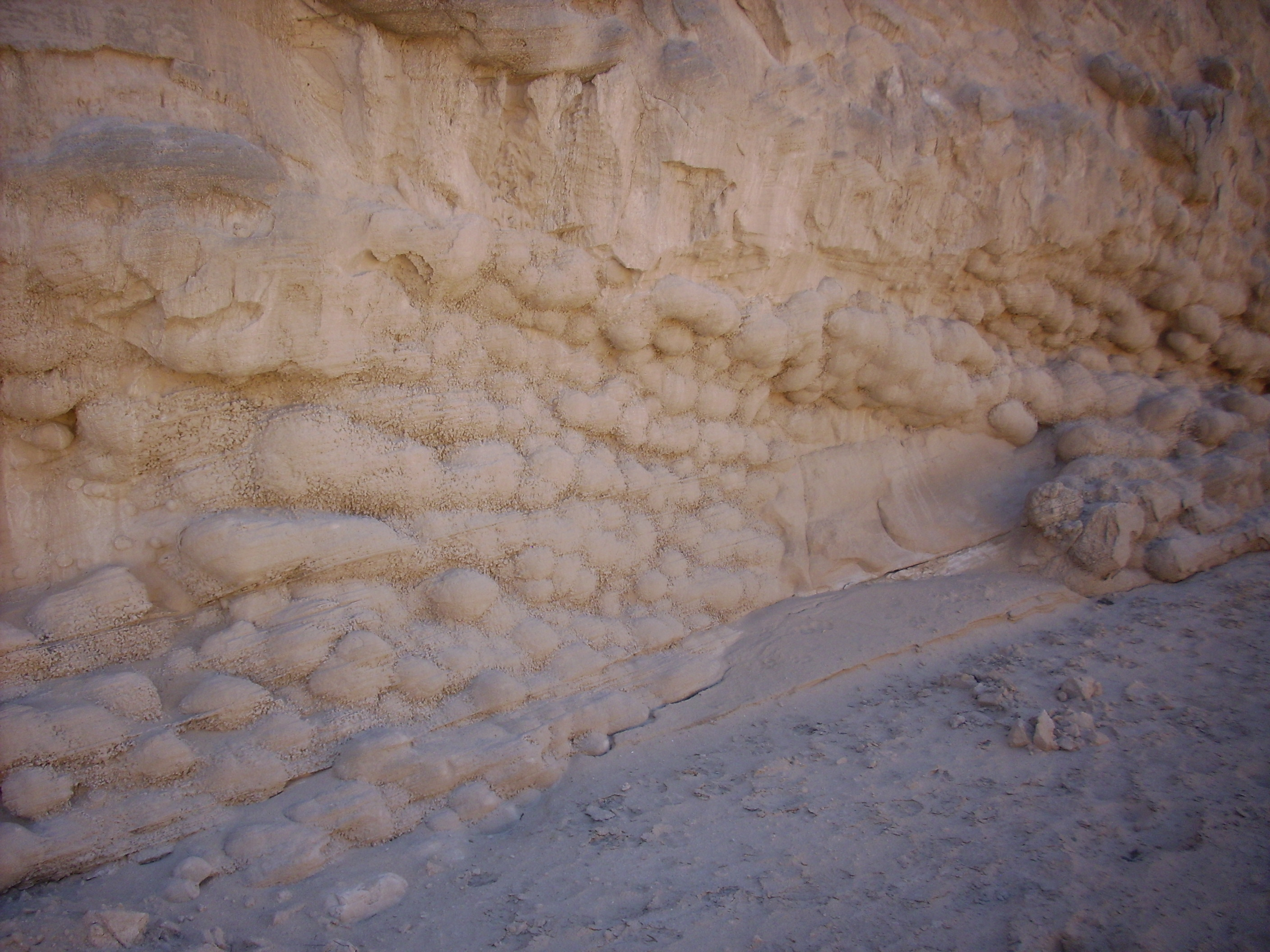
Concretions in an outcrop of the Ojo Caliente Member on the Lemitas Trail

== Fossils ==
G.K. Gilbert visited San Ildefonso Pueblo with the Hayden Survey in 1873 and found fossil mammal bones characteristic of the Pliocene. Some of these were sent to Othniel Marsh. Marsh's bitter rival, Edward Drinker Cope, arrived at San Ildefonso the next year and collected a number of Miocene reptile, bird, and mammal fossils.

Childs Frick sent an expedition into the Tesuque area in 1924, and immediately recognized the paleontological potential of the Santa Fe beds. The Fricks Laboratory (merged with the Department of Vertebrate Paleontology of the American Museum of Natural History in 1968) carried out field work through 1972. Work prior to 1940 was careless about identifying exact source strata, though greater care was taken thereafter. Most of the fossils came from the Pojoaque Member of the Tesuque Formation and were almost entirely found within thin (0.5–3 m) maroon-red to pale green claystone to fine-grained siltstone beds of lithosome B. These are interpreted as small lacustrine deposits.

Fossils found in the Tesuque Formation include the canids Hemicyon and Carpocyon webbi, the antilocaprids Cosoryx, Merycodus, and Ramoceros, chiroptera from the Vespertilionidae and Antrozoinae, the turtles Glyptemys valentinensis and Kinosternon pojoaque, and mastodonts. The formation provides an unusually complete record of the evolution of mammals through the Miocene.

== History of investigation ==
The beds making up the unit were originally described by Bryan and McCann in 1937 as the Middle Red member of the Santa Fe Formation. The formation was named by Baldwin in 1956 at the same time that the Santa Fe Formation was raised to group rank. The formation is named after exposures around the town of Tesuque, New Mexico.

In 1971, Galusha and Blick removed the uppermost beds from the Tesuque Formation as the Chamita Formation and divided the Tesuque Formation into members. These were, in ascending stratigraphic order, the Skull Ridge Member, the Nambe Member, Pojoaque Member, the Chama-El Rito Member, and the Ojo Caliente Member. Manley added the Cejita Member in 1977. Koning and Aby added the Cuarteles Member in 2005.

== See also ==
- List of fossiliferous stratigraphic units in New Mexico
- Paleontology in New Mexico
