= Chamitataxus =

Chamitataxus Temporal range: Late Miocene

Scientific classification
- Kingdom: Animalia
- Phylum: Chordata
- Class: Mammalia
- Order: Carnivora
- Suborder: Caniformia
- Family: Mustelidae
- Subfamily: Taxidiinae
- Genus: †Chamitataxus; Owen, 2006
- Species: †C. avitus

Binomial name
- †Chamitataxus avitus Owen, 2006

Extinct genus of carnivores

Chamitataxus is a prehistoric badger genus. Chamitataxus avitus is the only known species of the genus. Chamitataxus lived during the Late Miocene, around 6 million years ago in what is now North America. Out of the three taxidiine badger genera to have existed on the continent, Chamitataxus is the most primitive. Very few taxideine badger remains have been uncovered to date, with only prehistoric Taxidea and Pliotaxidea specimens being discovered prior to the Chamitataxus holotype being found.

== Description ==
Chamitataxus is known only from a single holotype found in 1935, which consists of a nearly complete skull. The holotype was discovered in a quarry not far from Lyden, New Mexico, where the prehistoric herbivore Osbornoceros was also discovered. Chamitataxus was named after the rock formation it was discovered in, the Chamita Formation. Due to the relative lack of Chamitataxus specimens, much of the research into the genus is based upon research into better-represented taxa related to Chamitataxus, such as Taxidea, the modern American badger, which also existed in the Late Miocene.

Chamitataxus was fairly similar to its modern-day relatives in most respects; it was a carnivore and judging from the skull found, it looked fairly similar. However, because so little of Chamitataxus has been found, estimating its size and other features is impossible; much is unknown about the genus. Chamitataxus had a very good sense of smell and had a firm grip like its modern equivalent and this enabled Chamitataxus to kill burrowing animals with a bite to the neck. Like other mammals, Chamitataxus excelled at hearing low-frequency noises, which it could hear at a long distance. Overall, Chamitataxus was an expert hunter based on scientists' findings, and was able to prey on many different types of land-dwelling creatures during the Miocene.
