= Popotosa Formation =

Group of geologic formations in New Mexico, USA

- Stratigraphic range: Neogene; 26.4–7 Ma
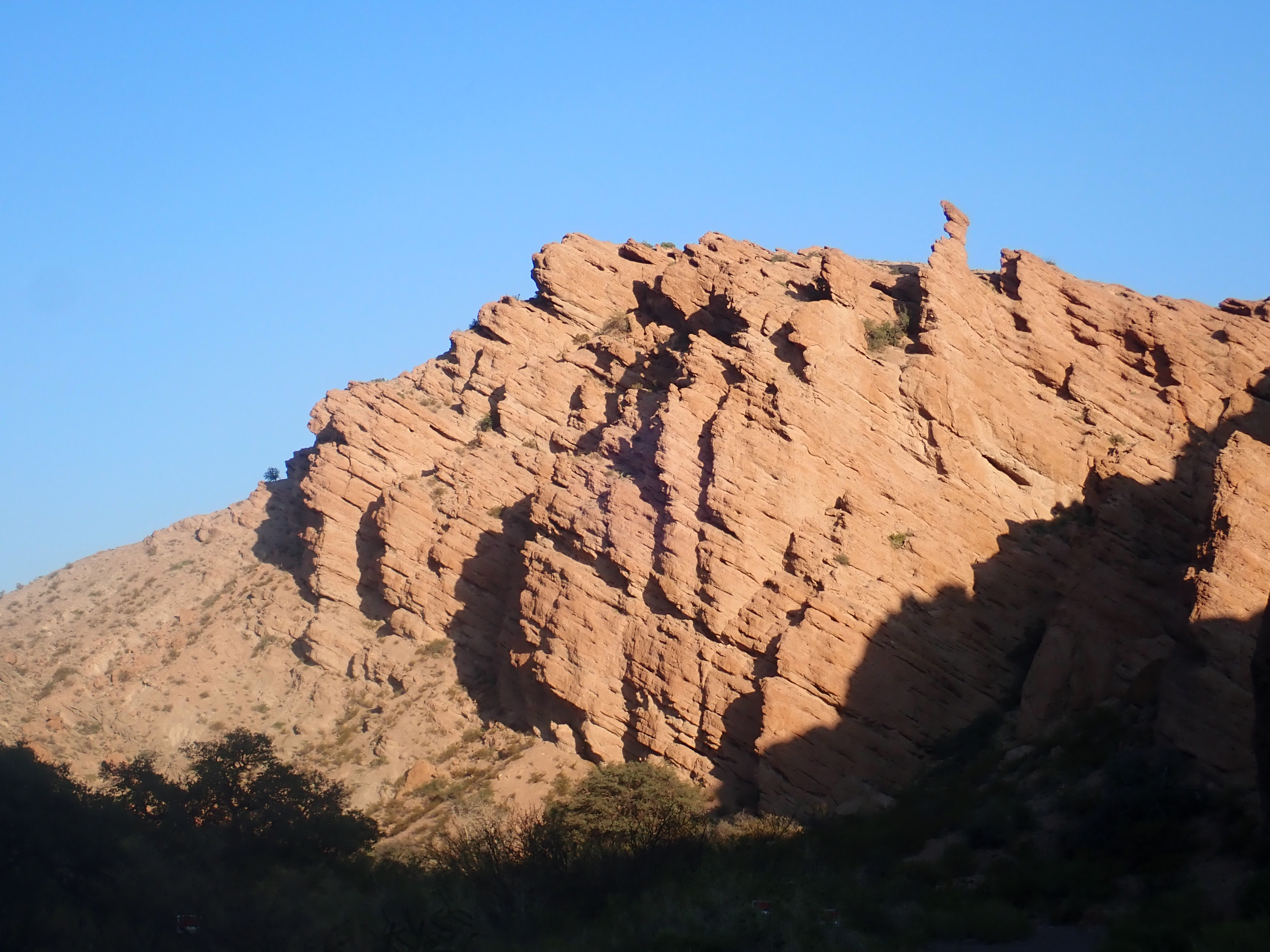
- Popotosa Formation at one of its reference sections, Canoncito de las Cabras, New Mexico
- Type: Formation
- Unit of: Santa Fe Group
- Underlies: Sierra Ladrones Formation
- Overlies: South Canyon Tuff
- Thickness: 1,447 m (4,747 ft)

Lithology
- Primary: Volcaniclastics
- Other: Tuff

Location
- Coordinates: 34.30000°N 107.04386°W
- Region: New Mexico
- Country: United States

Type section
- Named for: Canada Popotosa
- Named by: C.S. Denny
- Year defined: 1940
- Popotosa Formation (the United States) Popotosa Formation (New Mexico)

The Popotosa Formation is a geologic formation in New Mexico. It preserves fossils dating back to the Neogene period. These include the Socorro flora, notable for its fine preservation of plant reproductive structures.

== Description ==
The Popotosa Formation is a thick (up to 1,447 meters (4,747 feet)) sequence of volcaniclastic beds with a few interspersed ash beds. It is exposed along the Rio Grande rift in the Socorro area. Radiometric dating of interbedded flows gives it an age of 26.4 to 7 million yeawrs (Ma), corresponding to the late Oligocene to Miocene. It lies on tuff outflow sheets of the Mogollon-Datil volcanic field, primarily the South Canyon Tuff, and is overlain by the Sierra Ladrones Formation.

The formation is interpreted as deposition of fanglomerates (mostly derived from the Mogollon-Datil volcanic field to the southwest) and playa sediments in a closed basin in the early stages of rifting along the Rio Grande rift. It is thus typical of the lower Santa Fe Group. The formation was severely deformed in the late Miocene or early Pliocene and some beds dip as much as 60 degrees. Faults displace the formation hundreds to thousands of meters.

Deformation in the middle Miocene caused the area to subside at a rate that exceeded the sediment supply, forming a topographically closed basin in which the Popotosa Formation was deposited. Increasing tilt rates created a series of regional unconformities. When tectonic activity finally slowed in the latest Miocene and early Pliocene, sedimentation exceeded accommodation. The basin began to fill, spilled over, and became an open basin as it was integrated into the ancestral Rio Grande river system. Sediments deposited after integration became the Sierra Ladrones Formation.

== Fossils ==
The Popotosa Formation is the original locality for the Socorro flora, estimated to be 20 to 15 million years old. The Socorro flora is notable for its impressions of juniper foliage, angiosperm leaflets, and floral parts. It is of particular interest for its fine preservation, including of reproductive structures. The flora is dominated by Calliandra leaflets but also contains Juniperus

The formation has yielded a fossil of the pig-like oreodont Merychyus major major from an arroyo near San Antonito.

== Economic geology ==
The formation contains lithium-rich smectite clay beds with up to 1250 parts per million of lithium. However, the beds discovered as of 1979 are not extensive enough for economic exploitation.

== History of investigation ==
The unit was first described by C.S. Denny in 1940, who named it for exposures near Canada Popotosa. It was assigned to the lower Santa Fe Group by M.N. Machette in 1978.

== See also ==
- List of fossiliferous stratigraphic units in New Mexico
- Paleontology in New Mexico
