= Socorro Basin =

The Socorro Basin is a geographical feature in Socorro Co., New Mexico. It defines the transition where the Rio Grande Rift system broadens into a series of parallel basins separated by intra-rift horst blocks. Socorro Basin is hydraulically connected to rift basins to the north and south by flow-through drainage of the Rio Grande and southward flow of groundwater through alluvial sediments of the Rio Grande valley.

== Aquifers ==
The principal aquifer system consists of the shallow aquifer, the Popotosa confining bed, and the Popotosa aquifer. The minor aquifer systems, which are dominant along the basin margins, are the Socorro volcanics aquifer system and the Mesozoic-Paleozoic aquifer system. On the east side of the Socorro Basin, water enters the principal aquifer system from the Mesozoic-Paleozoic aquifer system. On the west side of the Socorro Basin, groundwater flows from the principal aquifer system in La Jencia Basin eastward to the principal aquifer system in the Socorro Basin.
