= Edith (disambiguation) =

Edith is a female given name.

Edith may also refer to:

== Places ==
- Edith, Texas, USA; a ghost town
- Edith Creek, Tasmania, Australia
- Edith River, Edith Saddle, Fiordland, New Zealand; a river
- Edith Falls, Edith River, Nitmiluk National Park, Northern Territory, Australia; a waterfall
- Edith Formation, New Mexico, USA; a Pleistocene geologic formation
- Mount Edith, Sawback Range, Bow River Valley, Banff National Park, Alberta, Canada; a mountain
- 517 Edith, the asteroid Edith, a main-belt asteroid, 517th asteroid registered

== Other uses ==
- Saint Edith (disambiguation)
- USS Edith, a U.S. Navy shipname
- PS Edith (1870), a paddle steamship
- Tropical Storm Edith, several cyclonic storms
- Edith (TV series), former name of the British TV show Hold the Sunset
- E.D.I.T.H., system created by Tony Stark in the Marvel Cinematic Universe

== See also ==
- Robert fitzEdith (1093–1172), illegitimate son of Henry I of England
- Aunt Edith (1962–1986), British racehorse
- Edith Weston, Rutland, East Midlands, England, UK
- Stoke Edith, Herefordshire, England, UK
- Eadgyth (disambiguation)
- Eadgifu (disambiguation)
- Ealdgyth (disambiguation)
