= History of Buckinghamshire =

Aspect of English history

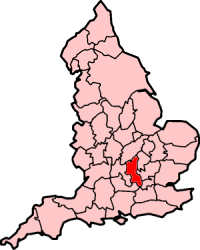
Ancient extent of Buckinghamshire

Although the name Buckinghamshire is Anglo Saxon in origin meaning The district (scire) of Bucca's home (referring to Buckingham in the north of the county) the name has only been recorded since about the 12th century. The historic county itself has been in existence since it was a subdivision of the kingdom of Wessex in the 10th century. It was formed out of about 200 communities that could between them fund a castle in Buckingham, to defend against invading Danes.

== Human settlement in pre-history ==
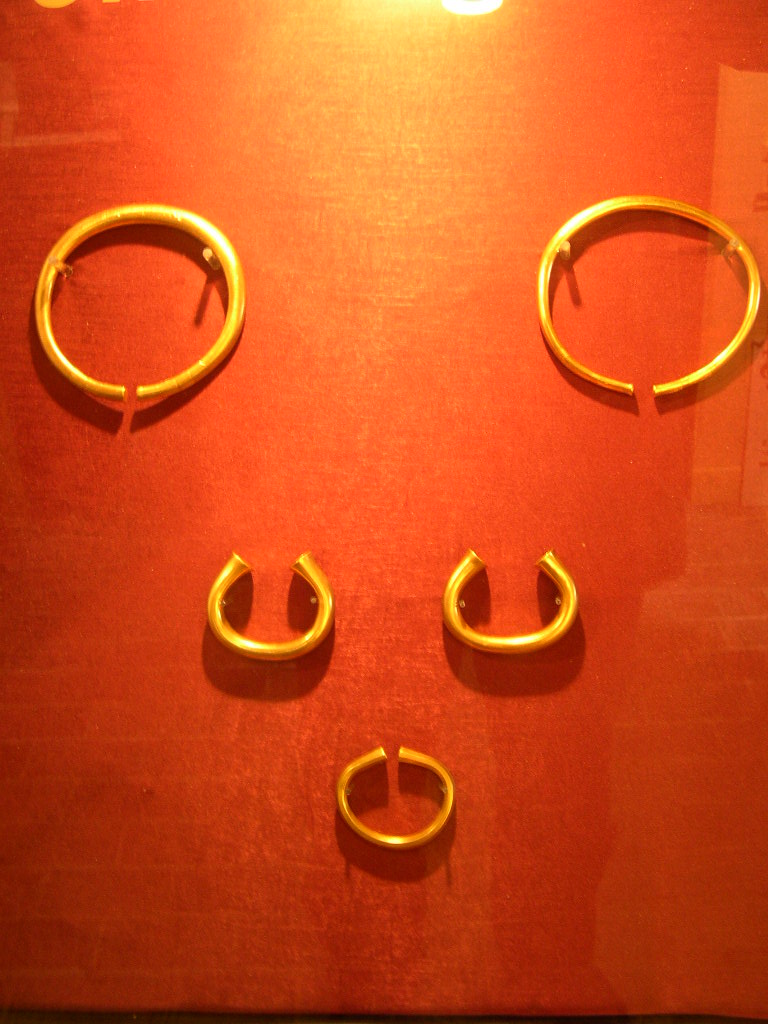
Reproductions of the Milton Keynes Hoard of Bronze Age torcs and bracelets

Some of the places in Buckinghamshire date back much further than the Anglo-Saxon period. Aylesbury, for example, is known from archaeological digs to date back at least as far as 1500 B.C. and the Icknield Way, which crosses the county, is pre-Roman in origin. There are a wealth of places that still have their Brythonic names (Penn, Wendover), or a compound of Brythonic and Anglo Saxon (Brill, Chetwode, Great Brickhill) and there are pre-Roman earthworks all over the county. Also, Cunobelinus, a legendary king of the Catuvellauni (an ancient British tribe) is said to have had a stronghold in the area (and to have inspired the name of a group of villages known as the Kimbles).

Settlement began in the area that was to become Milton Keynes around 2000 BCE, mainly in the valleys of the rivers Ouse and Ouzel and their tributaries (Bradwell Brook, Shenley Brook). Archaeological excavations discovered several burial sites dating from 2000 BCE to 1500 BCE. Evidence for the earliest habitation was found at Blue Bridge — production of flint tools from the Middle Stone Age. In the same area, an unusually large (18 metre diameter) round house was excavated and dated to the Late Bronze Age/Early Iron Age, about 700BCE. Other excavations in this Blue Bridge/Bancroft hill-side uncovered a further seven substantial settlement sites, dating from then until 100 BCE.

== Roman Britain ==
The Roman influence on Buckinghamshire is most widely felt in the Roman roads that cross the county. Watling Street and Akeman Street both cross the county from east to west though there is circumspection that these are based on older roads. The Romans also made use of the much older Icknield Way. The first two were important trade routes linking London with other parts of Roman Britain, and the latter was used by the Romans as a line of defence.

== Anglo-Saxons ==
The single group of people who probably had the greatest influence on Buckinghamshire's history, however, are the Anglo-Saxons. Not only did they give most of the places within the county their names, but the modern layout of the county is largely as it was in the Anglo-Saxon period. One of the great battles worthy of mention in the Anglo-Saxon Chronicle was fought between Cerdic of Wessex, his son Cynric and the Britons at Chearsley, which is named after Cerdic himself. Also no fewer than three saints from this period were born in Quarrendon (Saint Osyth, Saint Edburga and Saint Edith) and in the late Anglo-Saxon period a royal palace was established at Brill. The sheer wealth in the county was worthy of note when the Domesday Survey was taken in 1086.

== Norman conquest ==
William the Conqueror annexed most of the manors for himself and his family: Odo, Bishop of Bayeux, William's half brother, became a major landowner locally. Many ancient hunts became the king's property (worthy of note are Bernwood Forest, Whaddon Chase and Princes Risborough) as did all the wild swans of England. The ancient tradition of breeding swans in Buckinghamshire for the king's pleasure much later provided the inspiration for the heraldic supporter for Buckinghamshire County Council's coat of arms. The Plantagenets continued to take advantage of the wealth of the county.

== Henry VIII: Buckingham gives way to Aylesbury ==
Another flush of annexations of local manors to the Crown accompanied the Dissolution of the Monasteries (1536), when almost a third of the county became the personal property of King Henry VIII. Henry VIII was also responsible for making Aylesbury the official county town over Buckingham, which he is alleged to have done in order to curry favour with Thomas Boleyn so that he could marry his daughter Anne. Another of Henry's wives, Catherine Parr, also had a sphere of influence within the county at Beachampton.

Towns of the ancient county
1. Slough
2. Beaconsfield
3. Great Marlow
4. High Wycombe
5. Chesham
6. Princes Risborough
7. Wendover
8. Aylesbury
9. Winslow
10. Buckingham
11. Fenny Stratford
12. Stony Stratford
13. Newport Pagnell

== English Civil War ==
In the English Civil War (1642–1649) Buckinghamshire was mostly Parliamentarian, although some pockets of Royalism did exist. The Parliamentarian John Hampden was from Buckinghamshire, known particularly for his significant and successful battle tactics at Aylesbury in 1642. Some villages to the west of the county (Brill and Boarstall for example) were under constant conflict for the duration of the war, given their equidistance between Parliamentarian Aylesbury and Royalist Oxford. Many of these places were effectively wiped off the map in the conflict, but were later rebuilt. In the north of the county, Stony Stratford was Royalist and Newport Pagnell was Parliamentarian: the line of control between the sides echoed the Danegeld 700 years earlier.

== Industrial revolution ==
The Industrial Revolution and the arrival of the railway completely changed the landscape of certain parts of the county. Wolverton in the north (now part of Milton Keynes) became a national centre for railway carriage construction, and furniture and paper industries took hold in the south. In the centre of the county, the lace industry was introduced and grew rapidly, because it gave employment to women and children from poorer families. Queen Victoria was once quoted as preferring "Bucks lace" for her pillows. Buckinghamshire still has good rail links to London, Birmingham and Manchester and furniture is still a major industry in parts of south Bucks.

In the early to mid Victorian era a major cholera epidemic and agricultural famine took their hold on the farming industry which for so many years had been the stable mainstay for the county. Migration from the county to nearby cities and abroad was at its height at this time, and certain landowners took advantage of the cheaper land on offer that was left behind. One of the county's most influential families, the Rothschilds, arrived in Bucks during this time and they built or renovated a wealth of magnificent houses in the county.

== 20th century urbanisation ==
Mass urbanisation of the very north and south of the county took place in the 20th century, which saw the new town of Milton Keynes being formed and Slough becoming heavily urbanised. This was a natural extension of the industrialisation of the landscape, and also provided employment for many local people. Both of these towns have (together with their surrounding areas) become unitary authorities in their own right and are administratively distinct from the area controlled by Buckinghamshire Council. Milton Keynes remains within the boundaries of the ceremonial county of Buckinghamshire, but Slough was transferred in 1974 to Berkshire.

Today, Buckinghamshire is considered by many to be the idyllic rural landscape of Edwardian fiction and is known colloquially as leafy Bucks. This point of view is supported by much of the area being classed as Green Belt land, and has led to many parts of the county being very popular with commuters for London, which in turn has led to an increase in the general cost of living for local people. However, pockets of poverty still remain in the county, particularly in the large towns of Aylesbury and High Wycombe.

== See also ==
- History of Milton Keynes
- History of England
- Buckinghamshire (UK Parliament constituency)
