= Edith =

- Gender: Female

Origin
- Origin: Old English
- Meaning: Prosperity, wealth and strife.

Other names
- Related names: Ditte, Edit, Edie, Edythe (also Edyth), Editha

Edith is a feminine given name derived from the Old English word ēad, meaning wealth or prosperity, in combination with the Old English gȳð, meaning strife, and is in common usage in this form in English, German, many Scandinavian languages and Dutch. Its French form is Édith. Contractions and variations of this name include Ditte, Dita, and Edie.

It was a common first name prior to the 16th century, when it fell out of favour. It became popular again at the beginning of the 19th century and has remained in steady use. It has been among the top hundred most popular names for newborn girls in England and Wales since 2017. It has been among the top 1,000 names for girls in the United States since 1880 and was among the top 50 names for American girls between 1880 and 1927, the height of its popularity. It was ranked as the 513th most popular name for American newborn girls in 2022, according to the Social Security online database. It was the 518th most popular name for newborn girls in Canada in 2021, with 55 uses that year.

The name Edith has five name days: May 14 in Estonia, January 13 in the Czech Republic, October 31 in Sweden, July 5 in Latvia, and September 16 in France, Hungary, Poland and Lithuania.

== Persons called Edith ==
- In some Jewish biblical commentaries, Lot's wife is called Edith
- Edith of Polesworth (died c. 960), abbess
- Edith of Wessex (1025–1075), Queen of England
- Edith of Wilton (961–984), English nun
- Edith the Fair (1025–1086), first wife or mistress of King Harold II of England
- Edith Abbott (1876–1957), American economist
- Edith Agoye (born 1976), Nigerian retired footballer
- Edith Aitken (1861–1940), British headmistress
- Edith Vosburgh Alvord (1875–1962), American suffragist
- Edith Archibald (1854–1936), Canadian suffragist
- Edith Baird (1859–1924), American chess composer
- Edith Barr (1936–2026), Peruvian singer
- Edith Baumann (artist), abstract artist based in Santa Monica, California
- Edith Bideau (1888–1958), American soprano, music educator
- Edith von Bonsdorff (1890–1968), Danish-Finnish ballerina and choreographer
- Edith Bonlieu (1934–1995), French alpine skier
- Edith Bouvier Beale (1917–2002), American socialite and cousin of Jacqueline Kennedy
- Edith Ewing Bouvier Beale (1895–1977), American socialite and aunt of Jacqueline Kennedy
- Edith Bosch (born 1980), Dutch judoka
- Edith Bowman (born 1974), British television and radio presenter
- Edith Carr (1856–1919), American-Canadian China-painter and founder of the YWCA in Victoria, British Columbia
- Edith Cavell (1865–1915), British nurse
- Edith Mellado Céspedes (born 1938), Peruvian politician and educator
- Edith Clark (1904–1937), French aviator and parachutist
- Edith Clayton (1920–1989), Canadian basket maker
- Edith Brown Clement (born 1948), American judge
- Edith Clements (1874–1971), American botanist
- Edith Clever (born 1940), German actress
- Edith Cole (tennis) (1862–1945), English tennis player
- Edith Maud Cook (1878–1910), early British parachutist, balloonist, and aviator, recognized as Britain's first female pilot
- Edith Cowan (1861–1932), Australian politician and member of parliament
- Édith Cresson (born 1934), French politician and prime minister
- Edith van Dijk (born 1973), Dutch swimmer
- Edith Dimock (1876–1955), American painter
- Edith Dumont (born 1964), Lieutenant Governor of Ontario
- Edith Durham (1863–1944), British writer and anthropologist
- Edith Eaton (1865–1914), Canadian writer
- Edith Ebers (1894–1974), German geologist, glaciologist
- Edith Eduviere (born 1986), Nigerian football midfielder
- Edith Efron (1922–2001), American journalist
- Edith Ellis (1861–1916), British writer
- Edith Evans (1888–1976), British actress
- Edith Falco (born 1963), better known as Edie Falco, American actress
- Edith Finch, Countess of Aylesford (1854–1897), English noblewoman
- Edith Firth (1927–2005), Canadian historian and librarian
- Edith Fisch (1923–2006), American jurist and legal scholar
- Edith Flagg (1919–2014), American fashion designer
- Edith M. Flanigen (1929–2026), American chemist
- Edith Willis Linn Forbes (1865–1945), American poet and writer
- Edith Frank (1900–1945), German mother of diarist and Holocaust victim Anne Frank
- Edith González (1964–2019), Mexican actress
- Edith Green (1910–1987), American politician and congresswoman
- Edith Julia Griswold (1863–1926), American lawyer and patent expert
- Edith Grossman (1936–2023), American literary translator
- Edith Hacon (1875–1952), Scottish suffragist from Dornoch, a World War One nursing volunteer, as well as an international socialite
- Edith Halpert (1900–1970), American art dealer
- Edith Hamilton (1867–1963) American classicist and educator
- Edith Hancox (1874–1954), British-born Canadian socialist feminist and journalist
- Edith Hannam (1878–1951), tennis player from Great Britain
- Edith Head (1897–1981), American costume designer
- Edith Heard (born 1965), British-French researcher in epigenetics
- Edith Heath (1911–2005), American studio potter
- Edith Henderson (1911–2005), American landscape architect
- Edith Heraud (died 1899), English actress
- Edith Hermansen (1907–1988), Danish film actress
- Edith Irwin Hobart (1869–1958), American civic leader
- Edith Hogan, American politician
- Edith Holden (1871–1920), British artist and teacher
- Edith Howes (1872–1954), New Zealand writer
- Edith Jacobson (1897–1978), German psychoanalyst
- Edith Jones (born 1949), American judge
- Edith Katiji, known professionally as Edith WeUtonga, (born 1979), Zimbabwean musician
- Edith Kellnhauser (1933–2019), nursing scientist, educator, and writer
- Edith Balfour Lyttelton (1865–1948), British novelist
- Edith Hyde Robbins Macartney (1895–1978), first "Miss America"
- Edith Scott Magna (1885–1960), American civic leader
- Edith Masai (born 1967), Kenyan former long-distance runner
- Edith Massey (actress) (1918–1984), American actress and singer
- Edith Massey (1863–1946), Welsh botanist and painter, one of the two Massey Sisters
- Edith Master (1932–2013), American equestrian
- Edith Mathis (1938–2025), Swiss soprano
- Edith May, pseudonym of Anne Drinker (1827–1903), American poet
- Edith McAlinden (born 1968), Scottish murderer
- Edith Kawelohea McKinzie (1925–2014), Hawaiian author, genealogist, and traditional hula expert.
- Edith Maryon (1872–1924), English sculptor
- Edith McGuire (born 1944), American former sprinter
- Edith Morley (1875–1964), British literary scholar
- Edith Motridge (1913–2007), American competitive swimmer
- Edith Nakiyingi (born 1968), retired Ugandan middle-distance runner
- Edith Nesbit (1858–1924), British writer
- Edith Nielsen (1906–1994), Danish diver
- Edith Noeding (born 1954), retired female track and field athlete from Peru
- Edith Northman (1893–1956), American architect
- Edith Olivier (1872–1948), British writer
- Edith MacQueen (1900–1977), Scottish historian
- Edith Pargeter (1913–1995), British writer
- Edith Marion Patch (1876–1954), American entomologist
- Edith Pechey (1845–1908), British doctor and suffragette
- Edith Penrose (1914–1996), British economist
- Edith Philips, American writer and educator
- Edith Pitt (1906–1966), British politician
- Edith Quimby (1891–1982), American medical researcher
- Edith Raim (1965–2025), German historian
- Edith Ramirez (born 1967), American lawyer and chair of the Federal Trade Commission
- Edith MacGregor Rome RRC (1870–1938), President of the Royal College of Nursing
- Edith Roosevelt (1861–1948), American first lady and wife of Theodore Roosevelt
- Edith Rotch (1874–1969), American tennis player
- Edith S. Sampson (1898–1979), American judge and diplomat
- Edith Schippers (born 1964), Dutch politician
- Edie Sedgwick (1943–1971), born Edith Minturn Sedgwick, American model and actress
- Edith Sigala (born 1976), Mexican para table tennis player
- Edith Sitwell (1887–1964), British poet and critic
- Edith Södergran (1892–1923), Finnish poet
- Edith Somerville (1858–1949), Irish novelist
- Edith Stein (1891–1942), German philosopher and nun
- Edith Summerskill (1901–1980), British politician
- Edith Sutton (1862–1957), first woman councillor in England, mayor of Reading and suffragist
- Edith Templeton (1916–2006), European novelist
- Edith Thompson (1893–1923), English murderer
- Edith Thompson (historian), historian and lexicographer
- Edith Thys (born 1966), American World Cup alpine ski racer
- Edith Unnerstad (1900–1982), Swedish author
- Edith Udhardt (1929–2024), German nurse, social activist and politician
- Edith Wall (1904–2012), New Zealand/Australian artist
- Edith Wharton (1862–1937), American writer
- Edith Wherry (1876–1961), American writer
- Edith Widder (born 1951), American oceanographer, marine biologist, author, and the co-founder, CEO and Senior Scientist at the Ocean Research & Conservation Association
- Edith Wilson (1872–1961), American first lady and wife of Woodrow Wilson
- Edith Windsor (1929–2017), LGBTQ+ rights advocate
- Edith Wisa (born 1994), Kenyan volleyball player
- Edith Wolf (born 1972), Swiss former wheelchair racer
- Edith Woodhouse (c. 1860–1918), Scottish-born New Zealand artist
- Edith Zimmermann (born 1941), Austrian alpine skier

== Persons called Édith ==
- Édith Audibert (born 1948), French politician
- Édith Butler (born 1942), Acadian-Canadian singer-songwriter
- Édith Cresson (born 1934), French politician
- Édith Girard (1949–2014), French architect
- Édith Mourier (1920–2017), French mathematician
- Édith Piaf (1915–1963), French singer-songwriter, cabaret performer and film actress
- Édith Scob (1937–2019), French film and theatre actress
- Édith Thomas (1909–1970), French novelist, archivist, historian and journalist

== Fictional characters ==
- Edith Artois, fictional character in the British television series 'Allo 'Allo!
- Edith Bunker, a character in the 1970s sitcom All in the Family
- Lady Edith Crawley, fictional character in the British television series Downton Abbey
- Edith Hughes, fictional character in the American television series As The World Turns
- Edith Prickley, fictional character portrayed by Andrea Martin on the Canadian television series SCTV
- Edith Ross, fictional character in the American television series Suits

== Translations ==
- Albanian and Romanian: Edita
- Czech: Edita
- Finnish: Eedit
- French: Edith/Edyth
- Hawaiian: Ekika
- Hebrew: Idit/ עידית
- Hungarian: Edit
- Italian: Editta
- Japanese: Edisu/エディス
- Latvian: Edīte
- Lithuanian: Edita
- Polish: Edyta
- Portuguese: Edith/Edite
- Serbian: Edita/Едита
- Slovak: Edita
- Spanish: Edit
- Swedish: Edith/Edit
- Tongan: Iteti

== See also ==
- Eadgyth (disambiguation)
- Ealdgyth
- Edythe (disambiguation)
- Editha (given name)
- E.D.I.T.H.
