= Edita =

Edita is a Lithuanian, Czech, Slovak and Croatian female given name, a form of Edith. Notable people with the name include:

== Politics ==
- Edita Angyalová (born 1979), Slovak politician and entrepreneur
- Edita Hrdá (born 1963), Czech diplomat
- Edita Pfundtner (born 1973, Slovak lawyer and politician
- Edita Rudelienė (born 1978), Lithuanian politician
- Edita Tahiri (born 1956), Kosovar politician

== Arts and entertainment ==
- Edita Abdieski (born 1984), Swiss singer
- Edita Adlerová (born 1971), Czech opera singer
- Edita Ambrušová (1920–2015), Slovak painter and illustrator
- Edita Aradinović (born 1993), Serbian singer
- Edita Broglio (1886–1977), Latvian painter
- Edita Brychta (born 1961), English actress
- Edita Daniūtė (born 1979), Lithuanian dancer and TV presenter
- Edita Gruberová (1946–2021), Slovak opera singer
- Edita Mildažytė (born 1966), Lithuanian journalist and documentarian
- Edita Morris (1902–1988), Swedish-American writer and political activist
- Edita Piekha (born 1937), Russian singer
- Edita Schubert (1947–2001), Croatian painter

== Sports ==
- Edita Janeliūnaitė (born 1988), Lithuanian cyclist
- Edita Pučinskaitė (born 1975), Lithuanian cyclist
- Edita Raková (born 1978), Slovak ice hockey player
- Edita Schaufler (born 1980), German rhythmic gymnast
- Edita Šujanová (born 1985), Czech basketball player

== Other ==
- Edita Horrell, Lithuanian mountaineer
- Marija Edita Šolić (1946–2021), Croatian botanist and educator
- Edita Vilkevičiūtė (born 1988), Lithuanian model

== See also ==
- Edit (disambiguation)
- Edyta (disambiguation)
