= Saint Edith =

Saint Edith or St Edith's or variant, may refer to:

== People ==
- Edith of Polesworth (died 15 March AD 871)
- Edith of Wilton (961 – 15 September 984)
- Edith of Aylesbury, a Dark Ages English saint
- Saint Edith Stein (1891–1942), a German Jewish convert and martyr

== Other uses ==
- St Edith Hall, Kemsing, Kent, UK
- Church of St Edith, Bishop Wilton
- St Edith's Church, Eaton-under-Heywood
- St Edith's Church, Shocklach

== See also ==
- Edith
- Saint Editha (disambiguation)
