= Sythe =

Sythe may refer to:

- Osyth (d. 700 AD), an English saint
- an incorrect spelling of scythe, an agricultural hand tool
