= Cerro Conejo Formation =

Geologic formation in New Mexico, USA

- Stratigraphic range: Miocene, 14.6–9.5 Ma
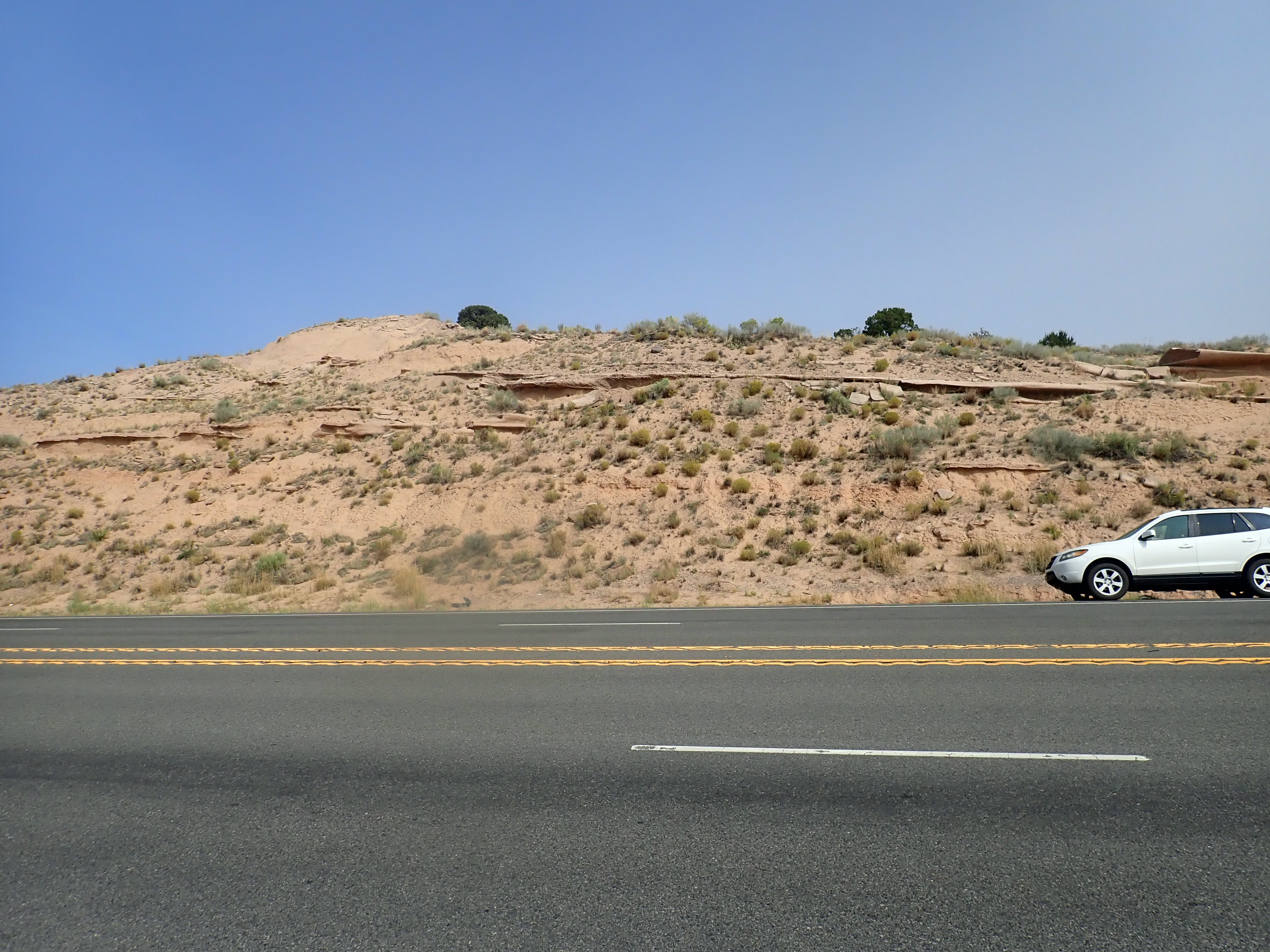
- Cerro Conejo Formation in road cut along U.S. 550, New Mexico, USA
- Type: Formation
- Unit of: Santa Fe Group
- Underlies: Arroyo Ojito Formation
- Overlies: Zia Formation
- Thickness: 316 meters (1,037 ft)

Lithology
- Primary: Arkose
- Other: Mudstone

Location
- Coordinates: 35.4089°N 106.8338°W
- Region: New Mexico
- Country: United States

Type section
- Named for: Cerro Conejo
- Named by: Connell, Koning, and Cather
- Year defined: 1999
- Cerro Conejo Formation (the United States) Cerro Conejo Formation (New Mexico)

The Cerro Conejo Formation is a middle to late Miocene geologic formation exposed near Albuquerque, New Mexico.

Gravel beds within the formation in the Rio Puerco valley west of Albuquerque have provided clues to the paleogeography of the Grants area since the early Miocene.

== Description ==
The Cerro Conejo Formation is composed of very light brown to pink or yellowish-red, fine- to medium-grained, well-sorted, medium- to thick-bedded sandstone. The beds are tabular and locally cross-stratified and include occasional thinly bedded mudstone. Sandstone grains are subrounded and frosted. The formation also contains numerous white to light greenish gray volcanic ash beds. The total thickness is 316 meters (1,037 ft). The formation overlies the Zia Formation and interfingers with the overlying Arroyo Ojito Formation.

One of the ash beds within the formation yielded a K-Ar age of 13.64 +/-0.09 million years (Ma. The overall age range is constrained to between 14.8 and 9.5 Ma.

Gravel beds within the formation in the Rio Puerco valley west of Albuquerque have provided clues to the paleogeography of the Grants area since the early Miocene. These beds have been assigned to the informal Benavidez Member.

== Fossils ==
The formation has yielded vertebrate fossils at the Rincon and Zia quarries that are characteristic of the middle to late Miocene (Barstovian to Clarendonian).

== History of investigation ==
The unit was first defined by Connell and his collaborators in 1999 as the Cerro Conejo Member of the Zia Formation. It was named for exposures along Arroyo Ojito near Cerro Conejo, a small hill northwest of Albuquerque. Arroyo Ojito was also designated as the type locality (no type section defined). Tedford and Barghoon recommended that the Cerro Conejo Member be reassigned to the Arroyo Ojito Formation, since there was a significant unconformity (corresponding to a pause in sediment deposition of 1 to 1.6 Ma) separating the Cerro Conejo from the rest of the Zia Formation.

In 2007, Williams and Cole recommended that the Arroyo Ojito Formation be abandoned, because the name was being used inconsistently and because the formation straddled a significant region unconformity, since named the Rincones paleosurface. They promoted the Ceja Member, which lay above the Rincones paleosurface, to formation rank, and moved the remaining members of the Arroyo Ojito into an informal "Middle Red" formation, recalling the earliest subdivisions of the Santa Fe Group. Connell responded the next year by concurring with the promotion of the Ceja Formation (which he divided into Santa Ana Mesa and Atrisco Members), promoting the Cerro Conejo to formation rank, and retaining the middle beds as the Arroyo Ojito.

== See also ==
- List of fossiliferous stratigraphic units in New Mexico
- Paleontology in New Mexico
