= Editha (given name) =

Editha is a feminine given name. Notable people with this name include:

- Editha Knocker (1869–1950), English violinist
- Editha Olga Bailey (1903–1980), president of multiple Australian organizations
- Editha Limbach (1933–2023), German politician
- Editha von Rahden (1823–1885), Baltic-German philanthropist
- Ann O'Delia Diss Debar, English criminal
- Editha Greville Prideaux, New Zealand artist
- Editha Aceituna Thurlow Griffin (1876–1949), British writer

== See also ==
- Edith, given name
- Editha, genus of wasps
