= Edith Formation =

Geologic formation in New Mexico, USA

- Stratigraphic range: Late Pleistocene–Middle Pleistocene
- Type: Formation
- Overlies: Arroyo Ojito Formation, Sierra Ladrones Formation
- Thickness: 10–40 feet (3.0–12.2 m)

Lithology
- Primary: Gravel

Location
- Coordinates: 35.152°N 106.658°W
- Region: New Mexico
- Country: United States

Type section
- Named for: Edith Boulevard in Albuquerque, New Mexico
- Named by: P.W. Lambert
- Year defined: 1968
- Edith Formation (the United States) Edith Formation (New Mexico)

The Edith Formation is a fluvial gravel Pleistocene geologic formation exposed near Albuquerque, New Mexico.

== Description ==
The Edith Formation consists of a single upward fining sequence, with a gravel base and overlying sandy to muddy floodplain deposits. It is poorly to moderately consolidated and locally cemented brown gravel, sand, and sandy clay. A typical composition for the basal gravel is 30% quartzite and 40% volcanic rock, with smaller amounts of granite and metamorphic and sedimentary rocks. It contains sparse clasts of densely welded Bandelier Tuff.

The formation extends at least from near Algodones to Albuquerque and forms a distinctive regional marker bed, cropping out along the inner valley escarpment of the Rio Grande. Its thickness is 10–40 feet (3.0–12.2 m). Its upper contact is marked by a diatomite bed and it unconformably rests on the Arroyo Ojito and Sierra Ladrones Formations, with a weakly developed paleosol (fossil soil) at the contact. The base of the formation defines a prominent strath (fossil floodplain) some 40–80 feet (12–24 m) above the present Rio Grande floodplain.

The formation was initially interpreted as a late Pleistocene terrace of the most recent glaciation. More recent work extends its temporal range into the middle Pleistocene.

== Formations ==
The Edith Formation contains fossils characteristic of the Rancholabrean North American land mammal age, including Bison, Mastodon, Camelops, and Equus.

== History of investigation ==
The unit was first defined by P.W. Lambert in his dissertation on the Quaternary geology of Albuquerque in 1968, and named for nearby Edith Boulevard.

== See also ==
- List of fossiliferous stratigraphic units in New Mexico
- Paleontology in New Mexico
