= USS Edith =

USS Edith may refer to the following ships of the United States Navy:

- USS Edith (1849), a screw steamer in commission during 1849
- USS Edith (ID-3459), a cargo ship in commission from 1918 to 1919
- USS Edith II (SP-296), a patrol vessel in commission from 1917 to 1919
- USS Edith M. III (SP-196), a patrol vessel in commission from 1917 to 1919
