= Thomas ap Catesby Jones =

United States Navy officer (1790–1858)

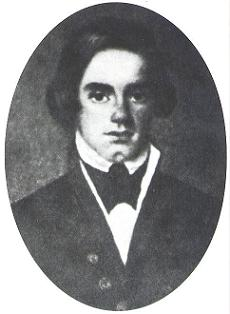
- Portrait of Jones
- Born: April 24, 1790; Westmoreland County, Virginia, U.S.
- Died: May 30, 1858 (aged 68) Sharon, Virginia, U.S.
- Buried: Fairfax, Virginia
- Allegiance: United States
- Branch: United States Navy
- Service years: 1805–1858
- Rank: Commodore
- Commands: USS Peacock; Pacific Squadron
- Conflicts: War of 1812; Battle of Lake Borgne; Capture of Monterey; Mexican–American War

Thomas ap Catesby Jones (24 April 1790 – 30 May 1858) was a United States Navy officer who served in the War of 1812 and Mexican–American War.

== Early life ==
Thomas ap Catesby Jones was born on 24 April 1790 in Westmoreland County, Virginia, to Catesby and Lettice (Turberville) Jones. The Jones family had originated in Wales and the middle name "ap Catesby" was a gesture to the patronymic surnames traditionally used in Wales; Thomas ap Catesby in Welsh means "Thomas, son of Catesby".

Jones' father died on 23 September 1801 leaving the family destitute. Jones and his older brother, Roger were taken in by an uncle, Meriwether Jones of Richmond, Virginia. His mother died in December 1804 after a long illness leaving Jones an orphan at age 14. His uncle provided for his and his brother's education at Richmond Academy until the expense of private school became a burden. They studied with a private tutor after leaving the school. Roger Jones later became Adjutant General of the U.S. Army.

== War of 1812 ==
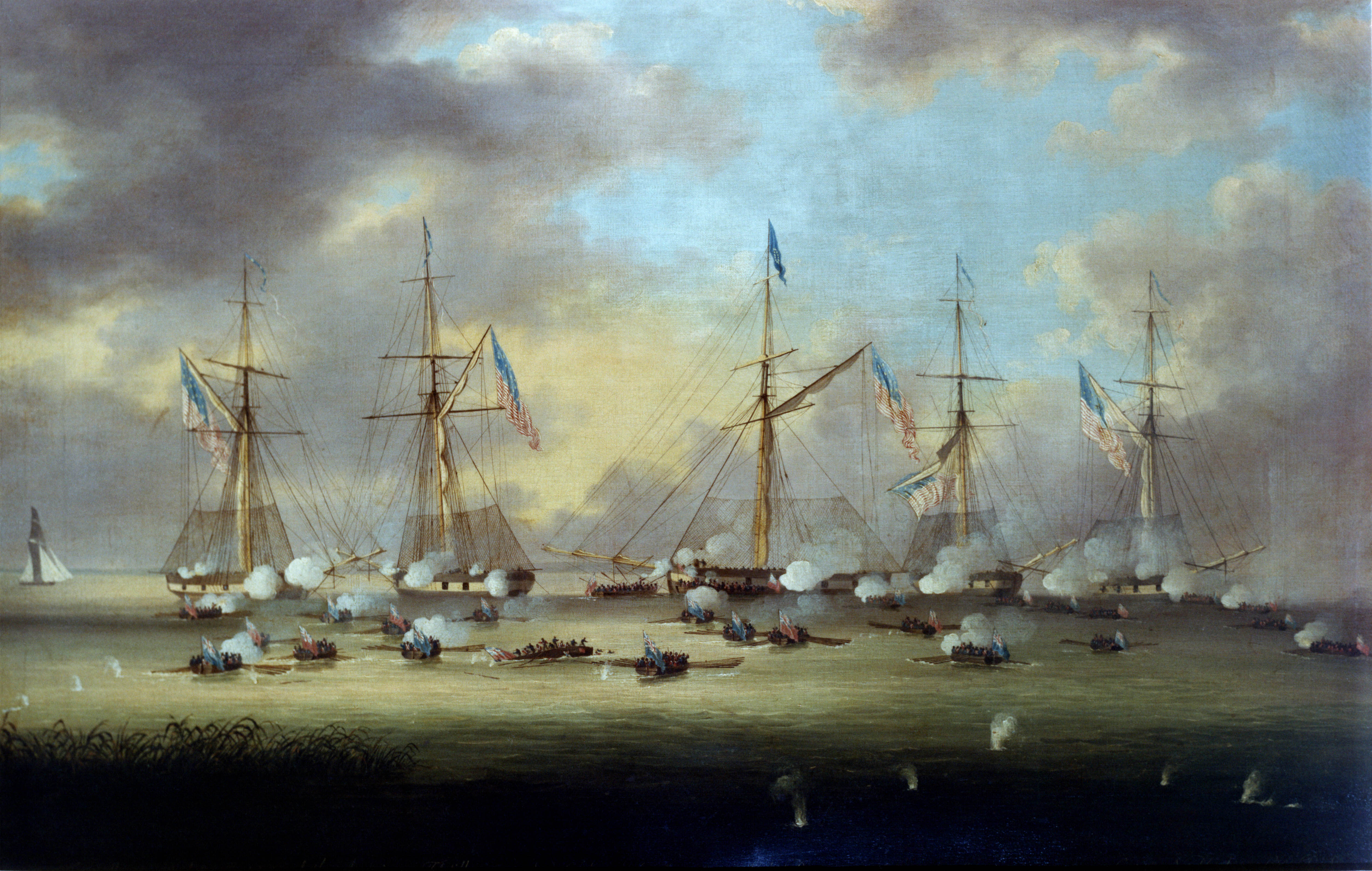
Battle of Lake Borgne, Louisiana

Jones was appointed a midshipman in the United States Navy on 22 November 1805 at the age of fifteen. Owing to a lack of openings for midshipmen he was not ordered to active duty. He was furloughed home and advised to study geography, navigation, and surveying so that his chances of getting an active assignment would improve. After the Chesapeake–Leopard affair, the Navy mobilized its gunboats and Jones was ordered to report to Norfolk, Virginia, where he was assigned to gunboat No. 10, reporting the first week of August 1807. Jones received honors for bravery at the 1814 Battle of Lake Borgne in Louisiana, where despite being defeated, he succeeded in delaying the British advance prior to the Battle of New Orleans.

== Between wars ==
In 1826, Commodore Jones while in command of the veteran sloop-of-war Peacock, signed treaties with the Kingdom of Tahiti and Hawaiian Kingdom. On September 6, 1826, Jones signed a treaty with Queen regent Pōmare Vahine on the behalf of the infant Pōmare III and other chiefs of Tahiti. On December 23, 1826, Jones signed a treaty with Queen regent Kaʻahumanu and other chiefs of Hawaii on behalf of the young Kamehameha III. In 1827, Peacock was severely damaged in an attack by a whale. Upon return to New York in October 1827, she was decommissioned and broken up in 1828. She was rebuilt as Peacock (1828), to serve as an exploration ship of the United States Exploring Expedition. Jones was to have commanded the expedition, but lack of funding delayed the expedition until 1838, by which time he had resigned the appointment.

In May 1836, an act of Congress authorized the president to establish the five year United States Exploring Expedition "to the Pacific Ocean and South Seas", the first extra-continental American scientific exploration. Jones was appointed Commander of the Expedition. Delays in Expedition departure dates, and various other disagreements, led to Jones (and certain scientists, including botanist Asa Gray) declining the position in December 1837. The position was subsequently offered to Charles Wilkes. From 1841 to 1844, Jones commanded the United States Pacific Squadron, and again from 1848 to 1850. In 1842, four years before the start of the Mexican–American War, Jones mistakenly thought that war had begun. He seized the California port of Monterey and held it for one day before returning control to Mexico.

Hearing that Royal Navy officer Lord George Paulet had occupied the Hawaiian Kingdom, he sailed there and arrived July 22, 1843. The king was restored July 31, and Jones tried to hasten peace by hosting all parties to dinner aboard his ship. In 1843, Jones returned a young deserter, Herman Melville, to the U.S. from the Sandwich Islands, as the Hawaiian Islands were then known. Later, Melville modeled "Commodore J—" in Moby-Dick, and the Commodore in White-Jacket after Jones. In 1827 Peacock under Jones's command had been severely damaged in an attack by a whale, which Melville took to have been a sperm whale. Moby-Dick Chapter 45 ("The Affidavit") is most probably especially shaped by part of the career of Jones. By early 1844 Alexander Dallas had replaced Jones as Pacific commander.

== Later career ==
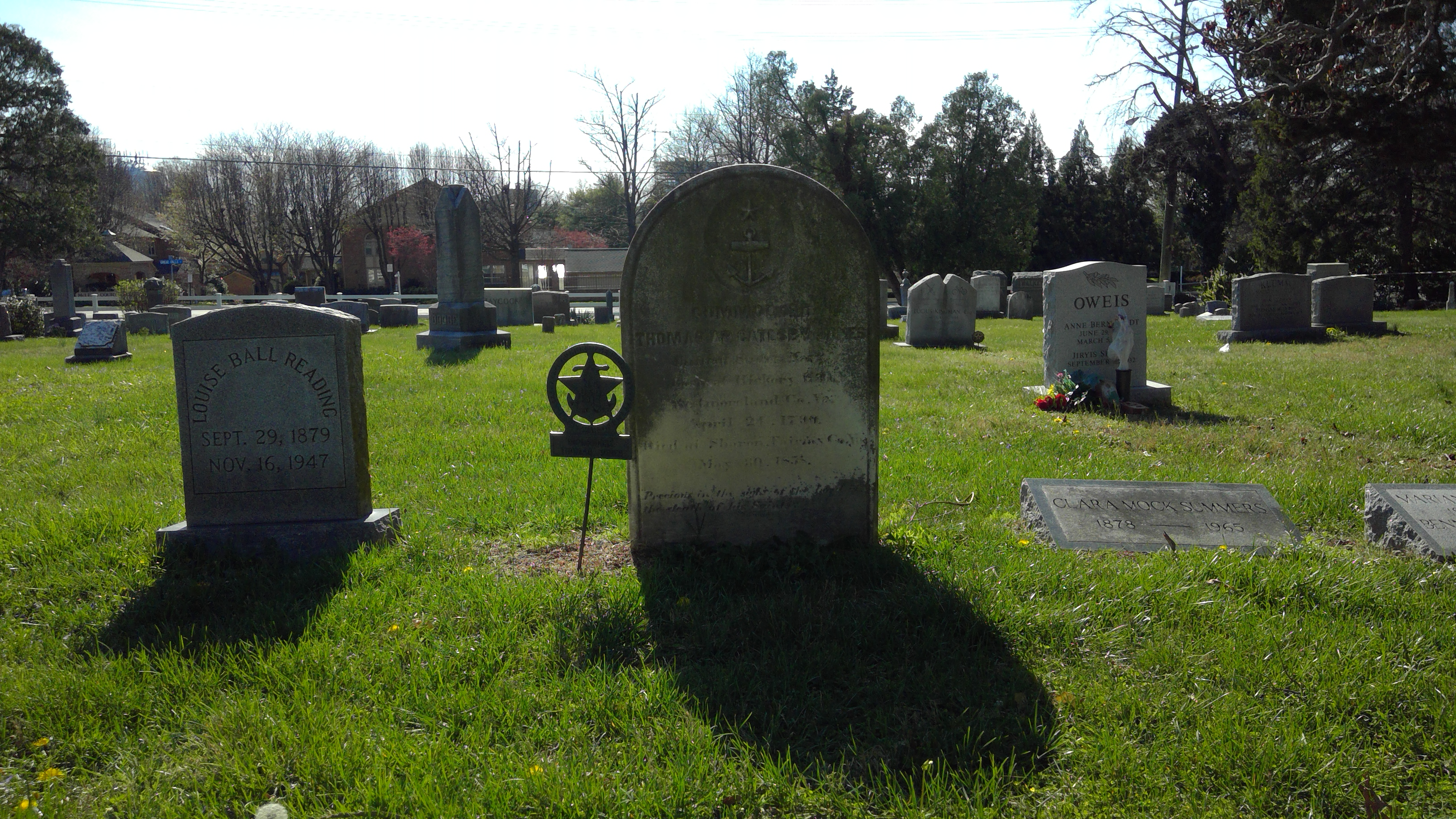
Grave of Thomas ap Catesby Jones in the cemetery of the Lewinsville Presbyterian Church, Lewinsville, Virginia

In 1848, Jones arrived in Mazatlán just at the end of the Mexican–American War, maintaining order until he could transport those who had aided the United States in that war to Monterey. For the next two years, during the chaotic gold rush days, Jones provided a U.S. Navy presence in the San Francisco area while the United States debated what to do with the newly acquired California Territory.

In 1850, in a politically charged court-martial shortly after White-Jacket was published, Jones was found guilty on three counts mostly related to "oppression" of junior officers and relieved of command for two-and-a-half years. In 1853, President Millard Fillmore reinstated him and in 1858, the United States Congress restored his pay.

== See also ==
- USS Edith
- USS Ohio

== Notes ==
=== Bibliography ===
- Bauer, K. Jack (1969). Surfboats and Horse Marines: U.S. Naval Operations in the Mexican War, 1846–48. Annapolis, Maryland: United States Naval Institute.
- Gapp, Frank W. (1985). "The Kind-Eyed Chief: Forgotten Champion of Hawaii's Freedom". Hawaiian Journal of History. 19. Hawaii Historical Society: 101–121. hdl:10524/235.
- Kuykendall, Ralph Simpson (1965) [1938]. The Hawaiian Kingdom 1778–1854, Foundation and Transformation. Vol. 1. Honolulu: University of Hawaii Press. ISBN 0-87022-431-X. OCLC 47008868.
- Maxwell, Richard T. (1955). Visit to Monterey in 1842. Los Angeles: Glen Dawson.
- Newbury, Colin W. (1980). Tahiti Nui: Change and Survival in French Polynesia, 1767–1945 (PDF). Honolulu: University Press of Hawaii. hdl:10125/62908. ISBN 978-0-8248-8032-3. OCLC 1053883377. Archived from the original (PDF) on 2019-11-10.
- Pritchard, George (1983). The Aggressions of the French at Tahiti: And Other Islands in the Pacific. Oxford: Oxford University Press. ISBN 978-0-19-647994-1. OCLC 10470657.
- Smith, Gene A. (2000). Thomas ap Catesby Jones. Annapolis, Maryland: Naval Institute Press. ISBN 978-1-55750-848-5.
- Stanton, William (1975). The Great United States Exploring Expedition. Berkeley, California: University of California Press. ISBN 0520025571.
- Stauffer, Robert H. (2009). "The Hawai'i-United States Treaty of 1826" (PDF). eVols. University of Hawaii at Manoa.
