= Frithuwold of Chertsey =

Frithuwald
- King of Surrey, Berkshire and Buckinghamshire

King of Surrey
- Reign: 673-675
- Successor: Frithuric
- Died: 675
- Spouse: Wilburga
- Issue: Frithuric

Frithuwald was a seventh-century Anglo-Saxon ruler in Surrey, and perhaps also in modern Berkshire and Buckinghamshire, who is known from two surviving charters. He was a sub-king ruling under King Wulfhere of Mercia. According to late hagiographical materials, he was a brother-in-law of Wulfhere. The monks of Saint Peter's Minster, Chertsey, revered Frithuwald, whom they considered the founder of their monastery, as a saint.

== Origins ==
While it has been argued that Frithuwald was a native ruler of Surrey, the consensus view makes Frithuwald a Mercian or Middle Anglian appointed by Wulfhere to rule over Surrey. His charters state that he had one son, but do not name him. The princeps Frithuric who was active in Mercia in the reign of Wulfhere's brother and successor Æthelred is presumed to be a kinsman of Frithuwald, perhaps his son.

The twelfth century life of Saint Osgyth of Aylesbury states that Osgyth was the daughter of Wilburh, sister of King Wulfhere, and a certain King Fredeswald. As Fredeswald and Frithuwald are simply variant forms of the same name, if this Fredeswald did exist, "it can hardly be doubted that he was the same man as the sub-king of the Chertsey charter".

The possible Frith family may also have included the eighth-century figures Saint Frithuswith, and Frithugyth, wife of King Æthelheard of Wessex.

== Charters ==
Two charters issued by Frithuwald to Eorcenwald, Abbot of Saint Peter's Minster, Chertsey, and later Bishop of London, survive. The first, dated to between 672 and 674, grants 200 hides of lands at Chertsey and 5 at Thorpe, together with 10 hides in London, to St Peter's. The second, dated after 675 and before 693, grants multiple estates in modern Surrey, Hampshire, and Berkshire, to Chertsey Minster. A spurious charter of King Wulfhere supposedly confirmed grants by Frithuwald to Chertsey, while later forged charters attributed to Offa, and to Edgar, claim to reconfirm Frithuwald's grants.

Among the witnesses to Frithuwald's charters are three other sub-kings, perhaps ruling the Mercian client kingdoms near to Surrey. These kings are Osric, Wigheard, and Æthelwald.

== Frithuwald's Surrey ==
The lands ruled by Frithuwald seemingly did not include all of the modern county of Surrey. However, his charters, while rich in geographical detail, do not describe the boundaries of his lands, only of the lands which Chertsey Minster was to receive. The core of these lay in the lands of the Woccingas, around modern Woking, probably bounded by the Fullingadic, perhaps an earthwork although it has been suggested that it could instead have been a Roman road, to the east. The lands beyond may have formed part of the Kingdom of Kent. Frithuwald's lands were based around royal vills—estate centres—of which Woking was one. Godalming, the centre of the Godhelmingas, lay to the south. Frithuwald's charters were done at Thame, north of the Thames, on the boundary between Oxfordshire and Buckinghamshire. The legend of Saint Osgyth may associate him with Quarrendon. If Thame and Quarrendon formed part of Frithuwald's lands, then they extended over much of modern Berkshire.

Frithuwald's Surrey has been suggested as a basis for the Little Kingdom in J. R. R. Tolkien's Farmer Giles of Ham.
