= Eadgifu =

The name Eadgifu, sometimes Latinized as Ediva or Edgiva, may refer to:

- Eadgifu of Kent (died c. 966), third wife of king Edward the Elder, King of Wessex
- Eadgifu of Wessex (902 – after 955), wife of King Charles the Simple
- Eadgifu, Abbess of Leominster
- Eadgifu the Fair (c. 1025 – c. 1086), a wealthy pre-Conquest landowner, first wife of Harold Godwinson

== See also ==
- Eadgyth, Old English form of the name Edith
- Ealdgyth, Old English form of the name Aldith
