= Arroyo Ojito Formation =

Geologic formation in New Mexico, USA

- Stratigraphic range: Late Miocene; 8.1–6.8 Ma
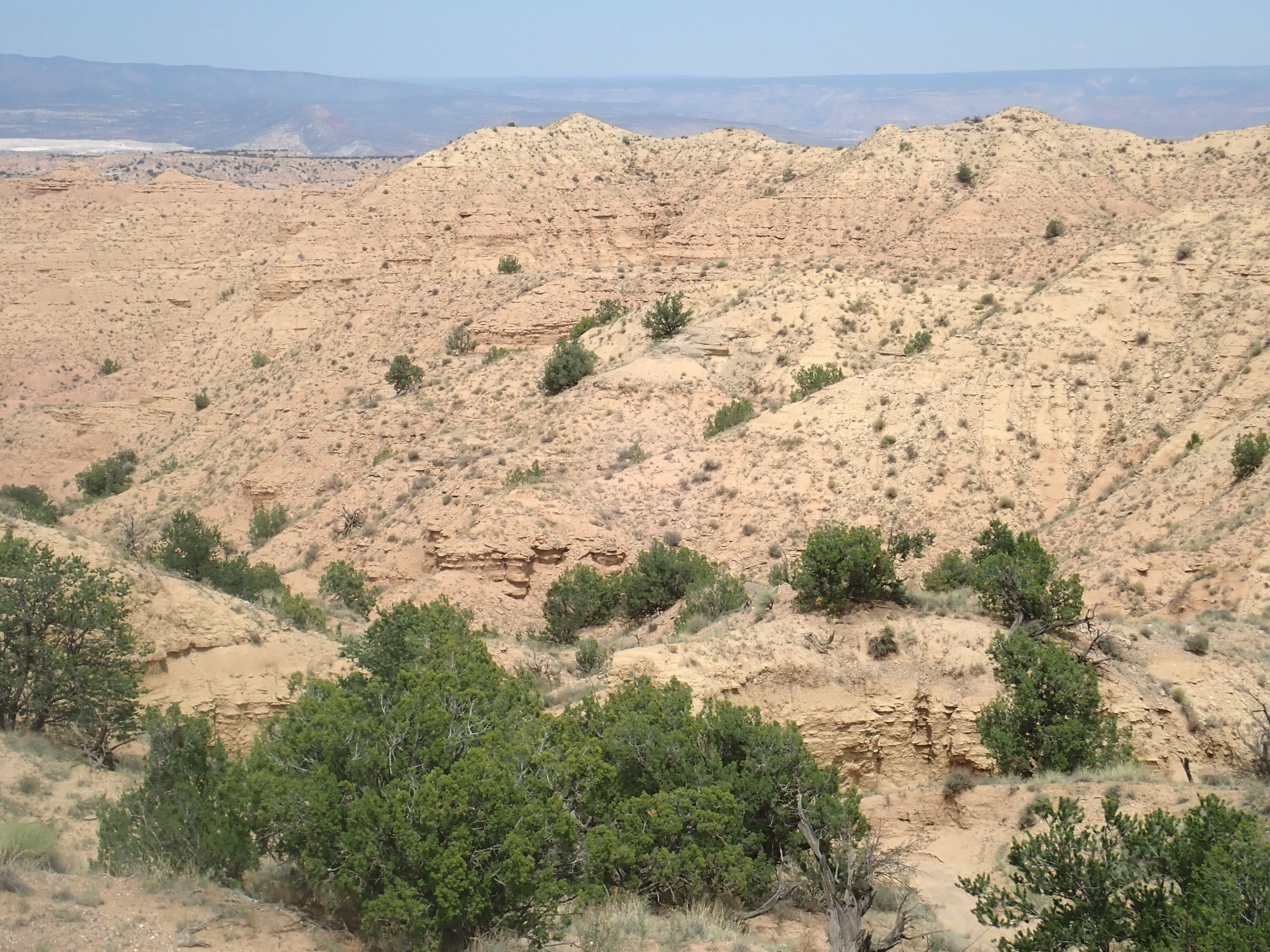
- Arroyo Ojito Formation at its type location northwest of Albuquerque, New Mexico, USA
- Type: Formation
- Unit of: Santa Fe Group
- Sub-units: Navajo Draw Member, Loma Barbon Member, Picuda Peak Member
- Underlies: Ceja Formation
- Overlies: Cerro Conejo Formation
- Thickness: 500 meters (1,600 ft)

Lithology
- Primary: Sandstone
- Other: Mudstone, conglomerate

Location
- Coordinates: 35.4277°N 106.7858°W
- Region: New Mexico
- Country: United States

Type section
- Named for: Arroyo Ojito
- Named by: Connell, Koning, and Cather
- Year defined: 1999
- Arroyo Ojito Formation (the United States) Arroyo Ojito Formation (New Mexico)

The Arroyo Ojito Formation is a late Miocene geologic formation exposed near Albuquerque, New Mexico. It records deposition of sediments in the Albuquerque Basin of the Rio Grande Rift after full integration of the Rio Grande through the basin.

== Description ==
The Arroyo Ojito Formation is composed of sediments deposited from streams draining the Sierra Nacimiento, San Juan Basin, and southeastern Colorado Plateau. These are mostly moderately to poorly sorted arkosic sandstone, mudstone, and conglomerate. The upper beds are coarse and more poorly sorted. The formation rests on the Cerro Conejo Formation and is unconformably overlain by the Ceja Formation. The total thickness of the Arroyo Ojito is nearly 500 meters (1,600 ft).

The formation is divided into the Navajo Draw, Loma Barbon, and Picuda Peak Member (in ascending stratigraphic order). The Navajo Draw Member consists of pale brown to pale yellow sandstone with some conglomerate lenses and mudstone deposited by numerous southeast-flowing rivers. The unit contains a basalt flow with an Ar-Ar age of 8.11 ± 0.05 million years (Ma), and a volcanic vent (Cerro Colorado) in the Rio Puerco valley with its base within the Navajo Draw has an Ar-Ar age of 7.1 ± 0.46 Ma.

The Loma Barbon Member is similar to the Navajo Draw, but is more poorly sorted and contains occasional mudstone beds. It contains volcanic tephra with an age of 6.8 to 7.1 Ma, identical to the Peralta Tuff Member of the Bearhead Rhyolite. The similarity in age with the Navajo Draw Member suggests the two members interfinger.

The Picuda Peak Member is mostly reddish sandy conglomerate and arkosic sandstone. It contains beds formerly assigned to the Ceja Formation but which are now known to lie below the Rincones paleosurface, a major regional unconformity. It is named for exposures of conglomerate near Picuda Peak. This member varies from 10–50 meters (33–164 ft) in thickness. This member is coarser than the underlying Loma Barbon Member, and its contact becomes disconformable to the east.

== History of investigation ==
The beds assigned to the unit were originally included in the upper part of "middle red member" of the Santa Fe Formation by Kirk Bryan and Franklin McCann in 1937. The unit was first defined by Connell and coinvestigators in 1999, and named for exposures along Arroyo Ojito northwest of Albuquerque. This was also designated as the type locality (no type section defined). The formation was divided into the Navajo Draw, Loma Barbon, and Ceja Members. As originally defined, the formation included all strata in the northwest Albuquerque Basin younger than the Zia Formation as then defined, except for Quaternary beds assigned to the (since-abandoned) Pantadeleon Formation. Tedford and Barghoon recommended that the Cerro Conejo Member of the Zia Formation be moved to the Arroyo Ojito, since there was a significant unconformity (corresponding to a hiatus in sediment deposition of 1 to 1.6 Ma) separating the Cerro Conejo from the rest of the Zia Formation.

In 2007, Williams and Cole recommended that the Arroyo Ojito Formation be abandoned, because the name was being used inconsistently and because the formation straddled a significant region unconformity since named the Rincones paleosurface. They promoted the Ceja Member, which lay above the Rincones paleosurface, to formation rank, and moved the remaining members of the Arroyo Ojito into an informal "Middle Red" formation, recalling the earliest subdivisions of the Santa Fe Group. Connell responded the next year by concurring with the promotion of the Ceja Formation (which he divided into Santa Ana Mesa and Atrisco Members), promoting the Cerro Conejo to formation rank, and retaining the middle beds as the Arroyo Ojito, divided into the Navajo Draw, Loma Barbon, and Picuda Peak Members.

== See also ==
- List of fossiliferous stratigraphic units in New Mexico
- Paleontology in New Mexico
