= Capture of Monterey =

1842 US attack in Mexico

Coordinates: 36°35′47″N 121°53′19″W

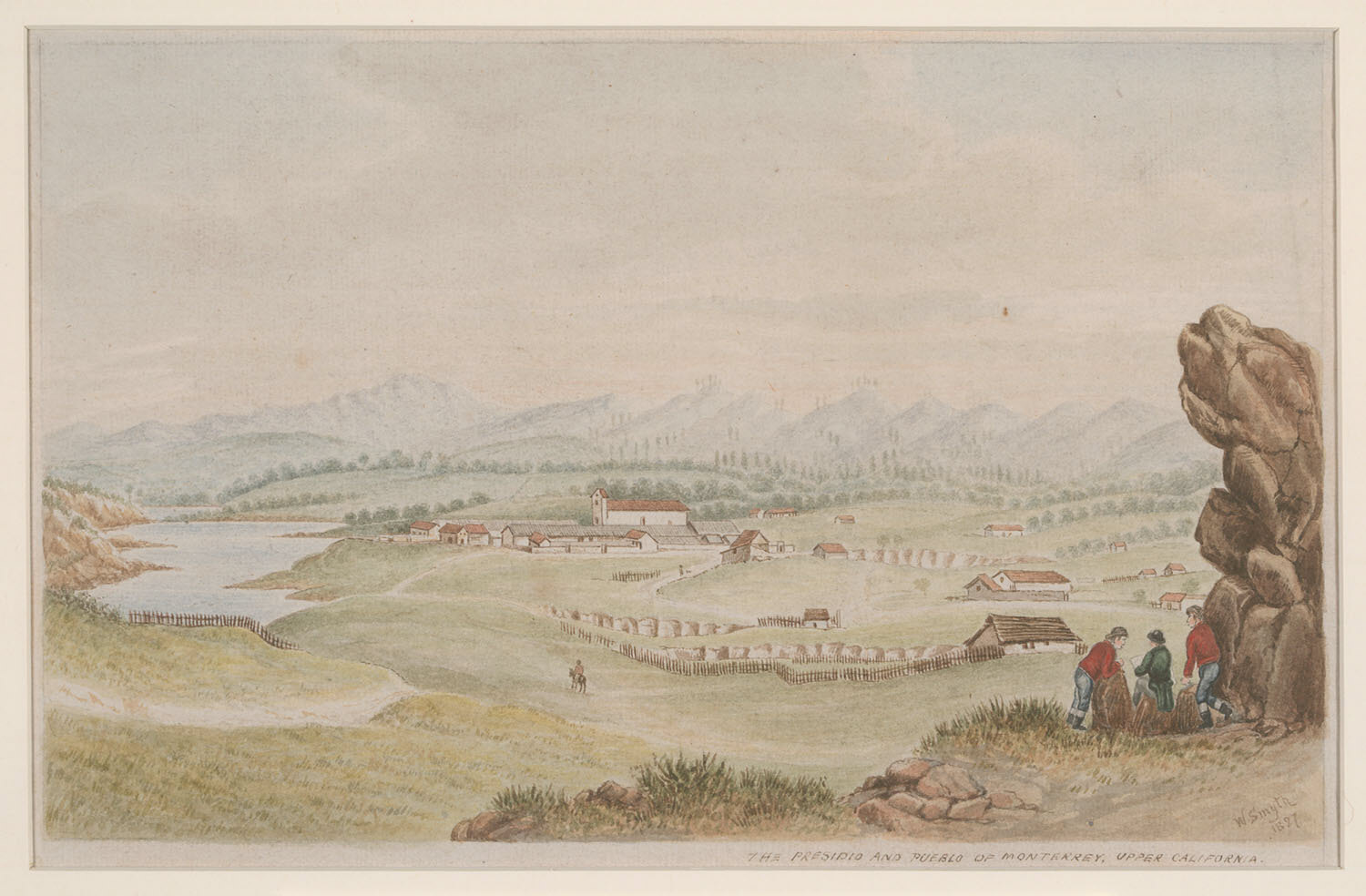
- The Presidio and Pueblo of Monterey, 1827
Date	19–21 October 1842 (3 days)
Location	Monterey, Department of the Californias, Centralist Mexico (now Monterey, California, U.S.)
Result	Inconclusive Full results: Americans restore Mexican possession of the area; Jones travels to Los Angeles to apologize to the appointed Governor; Jones is temporarily relieved of command
Territorial changes	Status quo ante bellum

Belligerents
United States	Mexico

Commanders and leaders
(United States) Thomas Jones; (United States) James Armstrong; (United States) Cornelius Stribling	(Mexico) Mariano Silva (surrendered); (Mexico) Juan B. Alvarado (surrendered); (Mexico) Manuel Micheltorena

Units involved
Units: Naval units (United States) Pacific Squadron	Units: Ground Troops (Mexico) M. Silva Battalion (Mexico) Local Town Militia

Strength
(United States) USA; Personnel: 150; 50 Marines; 100 Sailors; 1 frigate; 1 sloop-of-war	Mexico; Personnel: 54; 29 Soldiers; 25 Militiamen; 11 Cannons; 1 Fort

Casualties and losses
Total: 0; 0 killed 0 wounded	Total: 0; 0 killed 0 wounded 1 Fort captured

The Capture of Monterey by the United States Navy and Marine Corps occurred in 1842. After hearing false news that war had broken out between the United States and Mexico, the commander of the United States Navy Pacific Squadron Thomas ap Catesby Jones sailed from Lima, Peru with three warships directly to present-day Monterey, California. The Americans' objective was to take control of the capital city before a suspected British cession could be achieved.

Jones captured the Capitol, made the Mexicans surrender, and captured the City's Fortress; however, the next morning, after reading an August edition of the newspaper stating Mexico and the US were at peace, he held a war meeting agreeing that the city be returned to Mexico's possession.

== Capture ==
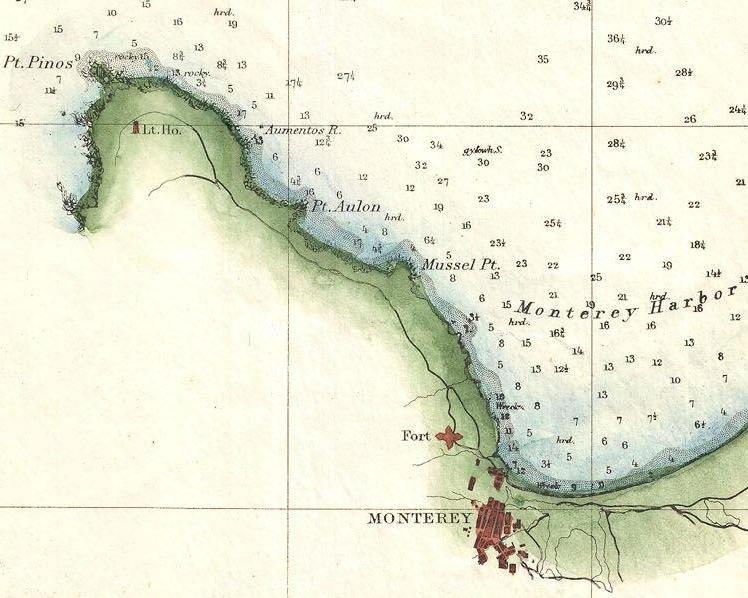
Monterrey Harbor Map showing the Fort to the North West of the Pueblo

American forces included the frigate USS United States and the two sloops-of-war USS Dale and USS Cyane. The squadron arrived in Monterey Bay on October 19 and anchored. Commodore Jones sent his second-in-command, Captain James Armstrong, ashore to demand a Mexican surrender by 9:00 a.m. the following morning. The Mexican garrison consisted of only 58 men in an old fort. Since they chose not to resist when 9:00 a.m. came, 50 American marines and 100 sailors landed and captured the city without incident.

== Aftermath ==
It was only the next day that Jones learned that war had not begun between the United States and Mexico and that the British were not preparing to take control of California. The Mexican troops were freed and, the landing party boarded their ships and set sail, saluting the Mexican flag as it exited the harbor.

Jones headed for the Hawaiian Kingdom, which had just been unofficially occupied by Royal Navy officer Lord George Paulet, and helped to restore the kingdom's independence. The incident proved unpopular in Mexico, and in response, Monterey's garrison constructed shore batteries and other defenses to guard its city from future attack, which came in 1846 during the Mexican–American War. Jones was relieved of duty but eventually served in the war with Mexico.
