= Edythe =

Edythe or Edyth is a female given name. It may refer to:

== Edythe ==
- Edythe Baker (1899–1971), American pianist
- Edythe Chapman (1863–1948), American stage and silent film actress
- Edythe D. London, professor of psychiatry and behavioral studies at the University of California at Los Angeles
- Edythe Lewis, the first black, woman disc jockey in Dayton, Ohio, in the 1950s
- Edythe Morahan de Lauzon, Canadian poet
- Edythe Shuttleworth (1907–1983), Canadian mezzo-soprano
- Edythe Wright (1916–1965), singer who worked with Tommy Dorsey

== Edyth ==
- Edyth Goodall (1886–1929), Scottish actress
- Edyth H. Schoenrich (1919–2020), American physician and educator
- Edyth Starkie (1867–1941), Irish portrait painter and sculptor
- Edyth Walker (1867–1950), American opera singer

== See also ==
- Edith
