= Ceja Formation =

Geologic formation in New Mexico, USA

- Stratigraphic range: Pliocene to Pleistocene, 7.1–1.25 Ma
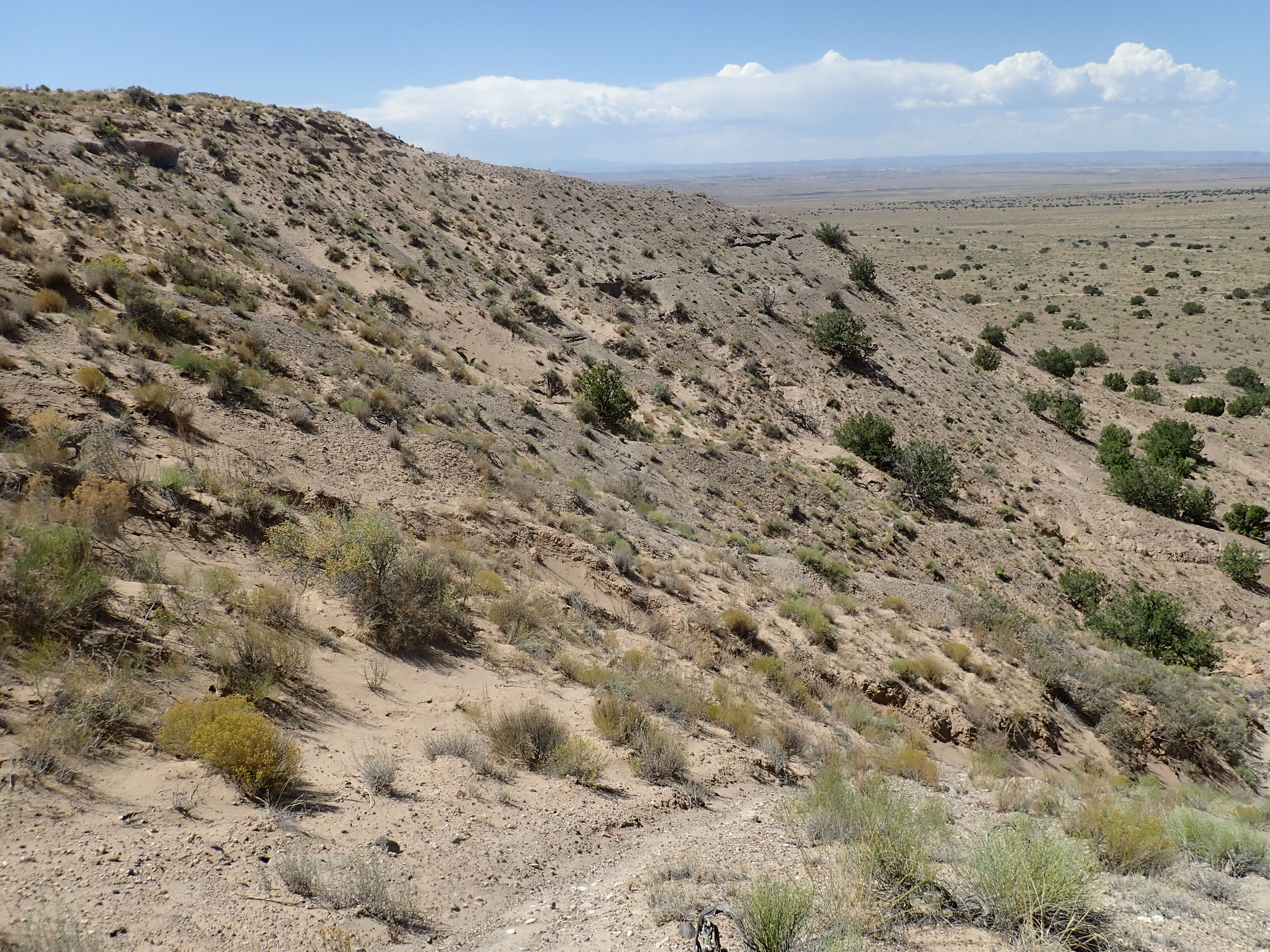
- Ceja Formation at its type section at El Rincon, west of Albuquerque, New Mexico
- Type: Formation
- Unit of: Santa Fe Group
- Sub-units: Rio Puerco Member, Atrisco Member, Santa Ana Mesa member
- Underlies: Llano de Albuquerque geomorphic surface
- Overlies: Arroyo Ojito Formation
- Thickness: 94–104 meters (308–341 ft)

Lithology
- Primary: Sandstone
- Other: Mudstone, conglomerate

Location
- Coordinates: 35.0874°N 106.8686°W
- Region: New Mexico
- Country: United States

Type section
- Named for: Ceja Mesa
- Named by: V.C. Kelley
- Year defined: 1977
- Ceja Formation (the United States) Ceja Formation (New Mexico)

The Ceja Formation is a Pliocene to Pleistocene geologic formation exposed near Albuquerque, New Mexico, United States.

== Description ==
The formation consists of weakly consolidated sandstone and conglomerate, varying in color from light yellowish-brown to reddish-yellow or pink. It consists of fluvial deposits with paleocurrent directions from the west. The lower beds are predominantly interbedded sandstone and mudstone while the upper beds are predominantly sandstone to conglomerate with occasional small boulders. The formation lies disconformably on the Arroyo Ojito Formation and its top beds are gravels capping the Llano de Albuquerque geomorphic surface. The lower beds sometimes contain white micritic carbonate pebbles interpreted as reworked caliche of the underlying Arroyo Ojito Formation. Total exposed thickness is 94–104 meters (308–341 ft).

Well logs indicate that the Ceja thickens to more than 420 meters (1,380 ft) in the subsurface on the western margin of the Rio Grande valley, where it likely interfingers with the Sierra Ladrones Formation.

Data from fossils and radioisotope measurements indicate that the formation is Pliocene in age. The data include an ash bed correlated to the 3.28 Ma Nomlaki Tuff. At Cat Mesa, the formation overlies a lava flow with a Ar-Ar age of 3.00 ± 0.01 Ma. A second flow within the formation has an Ar-Ar age of 2.68 ± 0.04 Ma. The formation is overlain by a third flow with a K-Ar age of 2.68 ± 0.04 Ma. A fossil pocket gopher is also consistent with a Pliocene age. Interbedded flows near Los Lunas give ages of 1.25 ± 0.02 Ma and 3.80 ± 0.04 Ma, extending the formation into the Pleistocene.

The formation is divided into the Atrisco Member, Rio Puerco Member, and Santa Ana Mesa member. The Atrisco Member is reddish-brown mudstone and sandstone, some 85–100 meters (279–328 ft) thick, mostly found in the subsurface but distinctive on well logs and discernible as a gradational boundary at the type section and as a sharper boundary further north. This is overlain by the Rio Puerco Member.

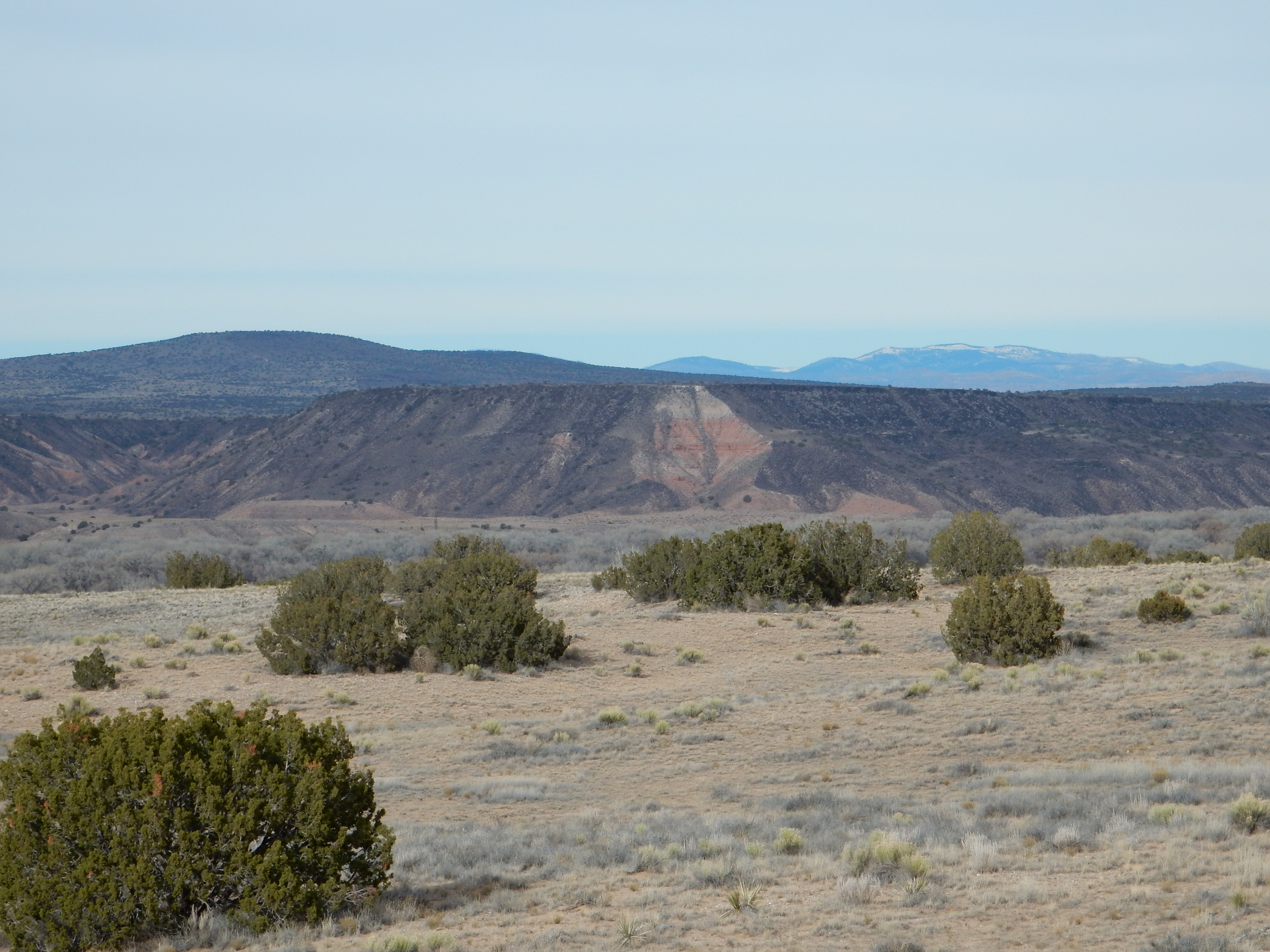
Distinctive red beds of the Santa Ana Member of the Ceja Formation in flank of Santa Ana Mesa, New Mexico, US

The Santa Ana Mesa Member consists of reddish-brown sandstone and conglomerate conspicuous in the flanks of Santa Ana Mesa. It contains a 7.1 Ma pumice bed. The unit is typically redder than the other members of the Ceja Formation.

The Rio Puerco Member named for the Rio Puerco. It forms a very poorly sorted mesa-capping gravel along Ceja del Rio Puerco. It disconformably overlies the Atrisco Member to the north but interfingers with the Atrisco Member further south.

== History of investigation ==
The unit was first defined by V.C. Kelley in 1977 for beds formerly assigned to the upper buff member of the Santa Fe Formation (now the Santa Fe Group) by Kirk Bryan and Franklin T. McCann in 1936. S.D. Connell and coinvestigators reassigned the member to the Arroyo Ojito Formation in 1999.

In 2007, Williams and Cole recommended that the Arroyo Ojito Formation be abandoned, because the name was being used inconsistently and because the formation straddled a significant regional unconformity since named the Rincones paleosurface. They raised the Ceja Member, which lay above the Rincones paleosurface, to formation rank, a recommendation with which Connell subsequently concurred.

== See also ==
- List of fossiliferous stratigraphic units in New Mexico
- Paleontology in New Mexico
