= Ealdgyth =

The name Ealdgyth (Old English: Ealdgȳð; sometimes modernized to Aldith, may refer to

- Ealdgyth, daughter of Uhtred the Bold, Earl of Northumbria (died 1016) and Ælfgifu who is a daughter of Æthelred II
- Ealdgyth (floruit 1015–1016) (born c. 992), wife of Sigeferth and then of King Edmund Ironside
- Ealdgyth, wife of the thane Morcar (died 1015)
- Ealdgyth, daughter of Earl Ælfgar (fl. c. 1057 – 1066), wife of Gruffudd ap Llywelyn and later of Harold Godwineson
- Edith Swanneck (c. 1025 – c. 1086), concubine of Harold Godwineson
- Ealdgyth of Wallingford, daughter of Wigot and wife of Robert D'Oyly (died 1091)

== See also ==
- Eadgyth (disambiguation), Old English form of the name (Edith)
- Eadgifu, sometimes Latinized as Ediva or Edgiva
