= Editha von Rahden =

Baltic-German philanthropist

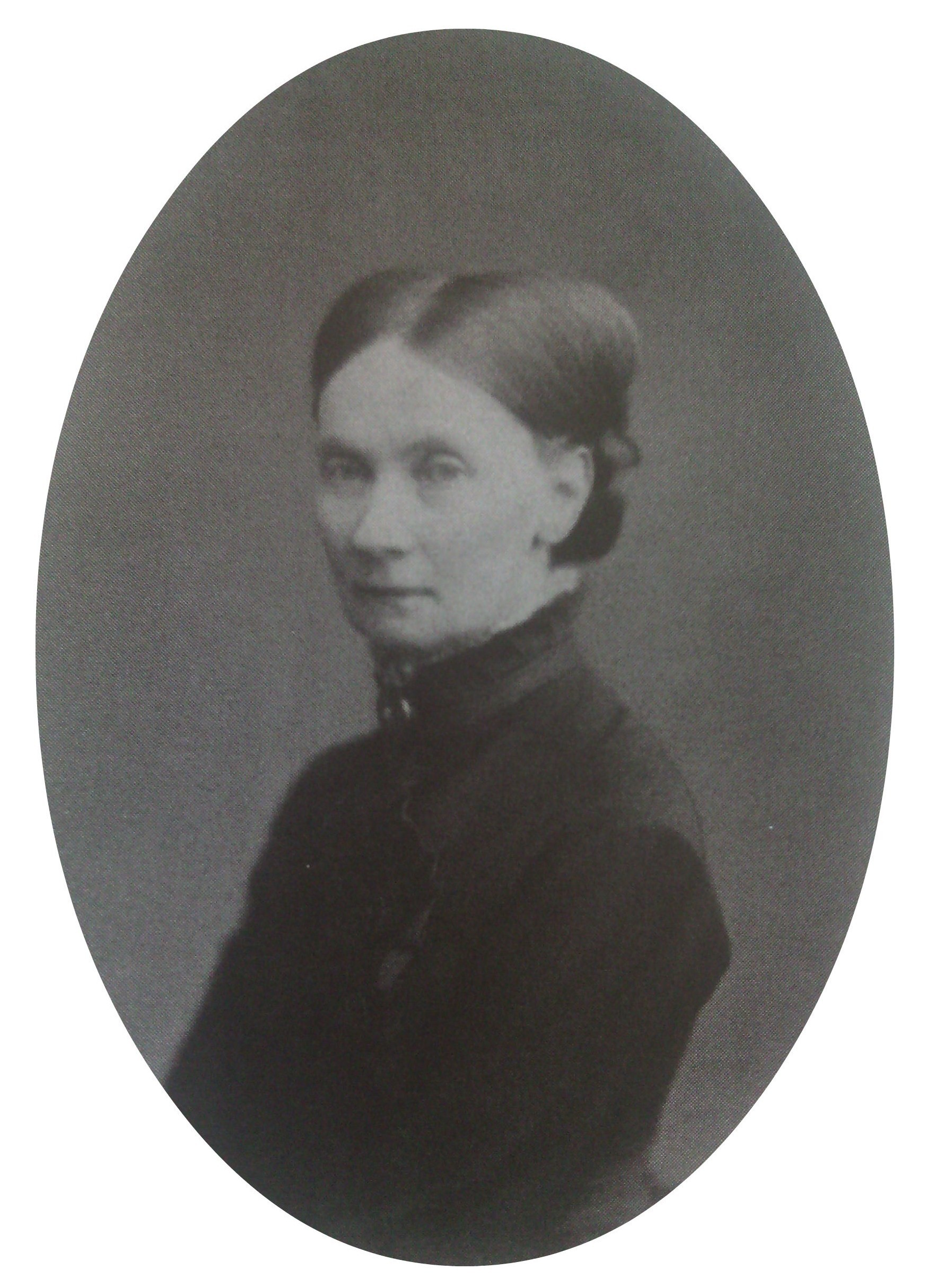
- Born: 20 December 1823
- Died: 9 October 1885 (aged 61); St. Petersburg, Russia
- Occupation: Philanthropist
- Parents: Ferdinand von Rahden (father); Wilhelmine von Keyserling (mother)

Editha von Rahden (Russian: Эдита Фёдоровна Раден, romanized: Edita Fyodorovna Raden; 20 December 1823 – 9 October 1885) was a Baltic-German philanthropist in the Russian Empire.

She was born to the courtier Ferdinand von Rahden and Wilhelmine von Keyserling on 20 December 1823. She was a lady-in-waiting to Grand Duchess Helena Pawlovna and later to Empress Maria Fedorovna. In Russia, she hosted a literary salon and among her guests were the poet Leskov, Carl Ferdinand Walter, Georg Berkholz, Carmen Sylva, and Cardinal Antonelli.

In the court of Helena Pawlovna, the "witty" Editha was known for her literacy and ability to summarize current literature, according to Bunnett.

Fraulein von Rahden, the favourite lady of the Court, was not to be surpassed in the art of making short compendiums of the bulkiest works, and for years German scholars joined this most unusual woman in her task, finding plenty to do in sifting the material with which the indefatigable royal reader was supplied.

During her employment with Helene Pavlovna, she became a member of her charitable nursing organisation in 1854. After this, she became engaged in several charitable organisations with a focus on medical care and female education. She assisted the Empress Maria in several of her projects.

She died 9 October 1885 in St. Petersburg, Russia.

== Sources ==
- "Раден, Эдита Федоровна" . Brockhaus and Efron Encyclopedic Dictionary (in Russian). 1906.
