= Edith Woodhouse =

New Zealand artist

- Born: Edith W Bathgate c.1860 Peebles, Scotland
- Died: July 30, 1918; Dunedin, New Zealand
- Education: Dunedin School of Art

Edith W. Woodhouse (c. 1860 - 30 July, 1918; née Bathgate) was a Scottish-born New Zealand artist. Her paintings are held in the Hocken Collection at the University of Otago in Dunedin.

== Biography ==
Edith W. Woodhouse (née Bathgate) was born in 1860 in Peebles, Scotland to Mary and John Bathgate. Her father was a judge and politician. In 1883, she married John Frederick Churton Woodhouse.

Woodhouse studied at the Dunedin School of Art and took lessons in watercolour painting from Frances Hodgkins. She exhibited at the Otago Art Society (1892-1916), the Otago Industrial Exhibition (1898) and the New Zealand International Exhibition Christchurch (1906-1907). Alfred Henry O'Keeffe "wrote of her 'delicate toned' watercolours which hung in many Dunedin houses." Several of her works are now held by the Hocken Collection, University of Otago.

Woodhouse died on July 30 1918. After her death, proceeds from the sale of Woodhouse's paintings were distributed between the Presbyterian and St Mary's Orphanages.
