= Edyta =

Edyta is a Polish feminine given name. Notable people with the name include:

- Edyta Bartosiewicz (born 1965), Polish rock singer
- Edyta Dzieniszewska (born 1986), Polish sprint canoer
- Edyta Geppert (born 1953), Polish singer
- Edyta Górniak (born 1972), Polish singer
- Edyta Herbuś (born 1981), Polish dancer, model, and actress
- Edyta Jasińska (born 1986), Polish track cyclist
- Edyta Jungowska (born 1966), Polish theater, film and television actress
- Edyta Koryzna (born 1973), Polish basketball player
- Edyta Krzemień (born 1985), Polish actress and singer
- Edyta Śliwińska (born 1981), Polish ballroom dancer

== See also ==
- Edita
