= Eadburh of Bicester =

Seventh century English nun and saint

Saint Eadburh of Bicester
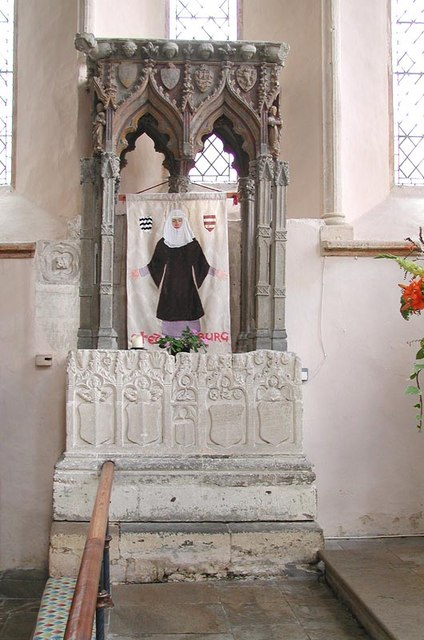
- Shrine of St Edburh in St. Michael's parish church, salvaged from Bicester Priory
- Born: 7th century Quarrendon
- Died: unknown
- Venerated in: Orthodox Church; Catholicism; Anglican Communion
- Major shrine: Stanton Harcourt
- Feast: 18 July

Eadburh of Bicester (also Eadburth, or Edburg, death c. 650) was an English nun, abbess, and saint from the 7th century. She has been called a "bit of a mystery"; there have been several Saxon saints with the same name, so it is difficult to pinpoint which one was Eadburh. It is said that Eadburh of Bicester was the daughter of King Penda of Mercia, who was pagan but had several children who were Christians, or King Frithewald. Eadburgh was born in the now-deserted village of Quarrendon in Buckinghamshire. Her sister was Edith (or Eadith), with whom she co-founded an abbey near Aylesburg; Eadburh probably became abbess at Aylesburg. She was also aunt of Osgyth, whom she trained "in the religious life". There are legends that claim that Edburgh and Edith found Osyth after she had drowned three days earlier and "witnessed her return to life".

Eadburgh might have lived at Adderbury, which may have been named for her, 30 miles from Aylesbury. She died c. 650; her burial place is unknown. In 850, a simple Saxon church was built in Bicester. In 1182, her relics were moved to Bicester, when an Augustinian priory was founded by a group of Canons regular and dedicated to Saint Eadburgh and to the Virgin Mary. Many pilgrims visited Eadburh's shrine and holy well there. During the Reformation in 1536, Sir Simon Harcourt, the sheriff of Oxford, destroyed the Bicester Priory church, but he saved Eadburth's shrine and moved it to Saint Michael's Church in Stanton Harcourt so that it could be used as an Easter sepulture. Other parts of the shrine were combined into a tomb in the Harcourt chapel. In the late 1940s, there was an attempt to return the shrine to Bicester, but it was unsuccessful. Saint Eadburh's feast day is 18 July.
