= Edith Clayton =

Canadian basket maker

- Born: Edith Drummond; September 6, 1920; Lake Loon, Cherry Brook, Nova Scotia
- Died: October 8, 1989 (aged 69)
- Occupation: Basket maker
- Parent(s): James Alexander Drummond, Selena Irene Sparks

Edith Clayton, née Drummond (September 6, 1920 – October 8, 1989) was a Canadian basket maker.

== Life and work ==
The daughter of James Alexander Drummond and Selena Irene Sparks, who were descendants of Black Loyalists who left the United States in 1812–1814, she was born Edith Drummond in Lake Loon, Cherry Brook, Nova Scotia.

The basket weaving technique that she used originated in Africa and was passed along from mother to daughter over six generations. The technique learned from her mother, incorporated African and British styles. Clayton used natural dyes obtained from Mi'kmaq women.

She showed and sold her baskets at craft fairs across Canada and exhibited at Expo 86. In 1977, Clayton was awarded a Queen Elizabeth II Silver Jubilee Medal.

Outside of the family, Clayton taught evening classes in basket weaving in Dartmouth for the Department of Continuing Education.

She died in East Preston at the age of 69.

Her daughters Althea Tolliver, Pam Drummond Wall and Clara Clayton-Gough continue the family tradition of basket weaving.

== Legacy ==
Clayton appeared in Sylvia Hamilton's film Black Mother, Black Daughter. Scholar Peggy Bristow (in a volume edited by Hamilton) Clayton's impact as "passing on a significant and uniquely African-Nova Scotian aspect of the province's heritage."
