= Eadgyth of Aylesbury =

Anglo-Saxon saint

Eadgyth of Aylesbury, Eadridus
- Born: England
- Died: unknown
- Venerated in: Catholic Church
- Major shrine: Aylesbury (?)

Eadgyth of Aylesbury also known as Eadridus was a Christian saint of Anglo-Saxon England.

== History ==
She is known to history mainly through the hagiography of the Secgan manuscript, but also the Anglo-Saxon Chronicle

One of her sisters was Eadburh of Bicester; the other, Wilburga, was married to Frithuwold of Chertsey. Wilburga's daughter St Osyth grew up in the care of her maternal aunts.

A 'Saint Edith' is also mentioned in Conchubran's Life of Saint Modwenna, a female hermit who supposedly lived near Burton-on-Trent. The text, written in the early 11th century, mentions a sister of King Alfred by the name of 'Ite', a nun who served as the Kings tutor and had a maidservant called Osid. Although an Irish nun called 'St Ita' was active in the 7th century, Ite's name has been interpreted as "almost certainly a garbling of Edith" and that of 'Osid' a rendering of Osgyth.

== See also ==
- Edith of Polesworth
