= USS Edith (1849) =

History

United States
- Name: USS Edith
- Acquired: 3 March 1849
- Fate: Ran aground, 24 August 1849

General characteristics
- Type: Screw steamer
- Displacement: 400 long tons (406 t)
- Length: 120 ft (37 m)
- Beam: 26 ft (7.9 m)
- Depth of hold: 14 ft (4.3 m)
- Propulsion: Steam engine
- Complement: 25
- Armament: 2 guns

USS Edith, a screw steamer, was built in Boston by Samuel Hall and launched on 14 November 1844. She was a three-masted barque of 407 tons displacement and carried a crew of 25 men and two guns. She measured 120 ft (37 m) in length, 26 ft (7.9 m) in beam and 14 ft (4.3 m) in depth.

She was transferred from the War Department to the U.S. Navy under congressional legislation of 3 March 1849, and turned over to Commodore Thomas ap Catesby Jones, Commander-in-Chief of the Pacific Squadron, at San Francisco, California. On 16 June Lieutenant James McCormick was ordered to report on the condition of the steamer; subsequently, he was placed in temporary command with orders to transport representatives to the California State Constitutional Convention.

USS Edith departed Sausalito, California on 23 August 1849 en route to Santa Barbara, California, but encountered dense fog which made accurate observations impossible. On the morning of 24 August she grounded on an off Point Conception and was lost. A court of inquiry held in January 1850 exonerated her commander and his crew from any guilt.

The warship may appear on the Seal of California, although there is no scholarly consensus on the matter.
