= Edith Hyde Robbins Macartney =

Miss America pageant holder (1895–1978)

Edith Norman Hyde Robbins Macartney (1895 – April 1978) became the first-ever "Miss America" in 1919 in a contest held in New York City. She later became a fortune teller under the pseudonym Pandora.

== Family and marriages ==
She was born Edith Norman Hyde to a well-to-do family in Boston, Massachusetts. Her father, Raymond Newton Hyde, was a landscape artist.

Hyde was married three times. Her first husband was the writer Clarence Aaron "Tod" Robbins; they eloped when she was 16 and he was still in college. They had two sons, Norman and John, and divorced shortly before she won the Miss America title. In 1920 she married J.W. Macartney, a Wall Street broker; this marriage broke up due to her alcoholism. There was apparently a third husband who died, but she never spoke about him.

== Miss America contest ==
Hyde was chosen as “Miss America” at the Chu Chin Chow Ball at the Hotel des Artistes in New York City on the evening of February 1, 1919, the year before the start of the better-known Miss America pageant centered in Atlantic City, New Jersey. The ball's beauty contest had been promoted beforehand, and the event drew socialites, artists, and several hundred young women. It was a costume ball with emphasis on 'oriental' costumes, and Hyde's harem outfit, which was heavily jeweled and embroidered, would later be restored and insured for $80,000.

The jury consisted of noted artists Charles Dana Gibson, Harrison Fisher, Howard Chandler Christy, Penrhyn Stanlaws, and James Montgomery Flagg, who afterwards painted Hyde's portrait. She was presented with a golden apple as her trophy.

Some sources claim that Hyde's photograph as contest winner was the first to be transmitted via the brand-new technology of wirephoto.

== Later life ==
After she won the competition, Florenz Ziegfeld invited her to join the Ziegfeld Follies and she had offers from Hollywood, but she declined all of them. She lived in various places in Europe before moving back to New York. By around 1950, she was working as a fortune teller near Times Square under the pseudonym 'Pandora', and she continued doing so at least into the late 1960s. She died in April 1978.
