= Zia Formation =

Rock formation in New Mexico

- Stratigraphic range: Miocene; 23–14.8 Ma
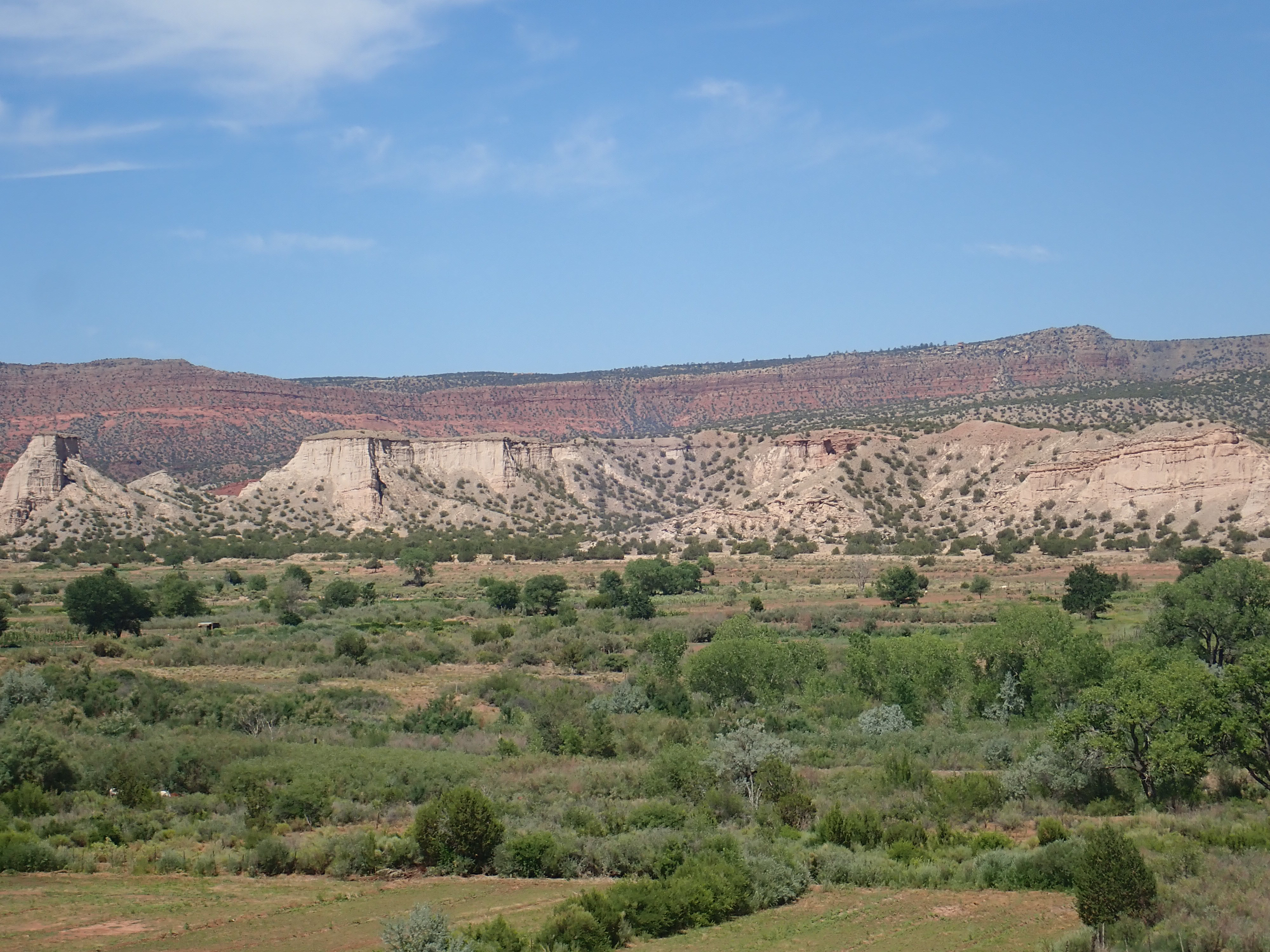
- Zia Formation badlands northwest of Jemez Pueblo
- Type: Formation
- Unit of: Santa Fe Group
- Underlies: Cerro Conejo Formation, Cochiti Formation
- Overlies: Galisteo Formation
- Thickness: 300 m (980 ft)

Lithology
- Primary: Sandstone

Location
- Coordinates: 35.5241523°N 106.748613°W
- Region: New Mexico
- Country: United States

Type section
- Named for: Zia Pueblo, New Mexico
- Named by: Regan
- Year defined: 1903
- Zia Formation (the United States) Zia Formation (New Mexico)

The Zia Formation is a geologic formation in the southwestern Jemez Mountains and northwestern Santo Domingo basin. It contains vertebrate fossils that date it to early to middle Miocene in age.

== Description ==
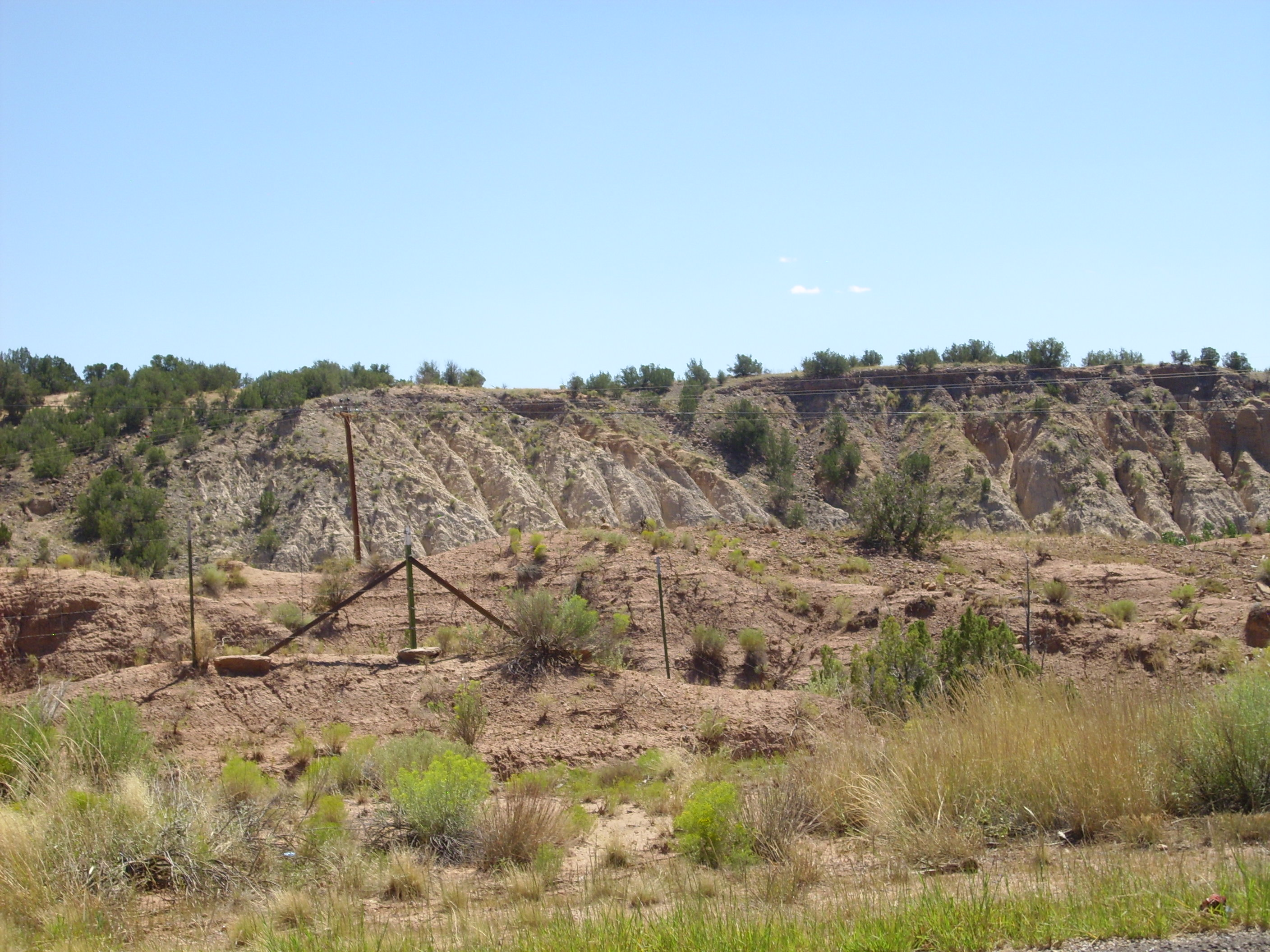
Zia Formation outcrops in the southwestern Jemez Mountains

The Zia Formation is a very soft quartz sandstone. The type section rests on about 10 meters (33 ft) of laminated greenish clay beds that in turn rest on the Galisteo Formation. The upper contact is with the Cerro Conejo Formation, with the Cochiti Formation, or with Miocene volcanic rocks of the Jemez volcanic field.

The formation is divided (in ascending stratigraphic order) into the Piedra Parada Member, the Chamisa Mesa Member. and the Canada Pilares Member.

The formation is interpreted as eolian deposits derived from volcaniclastics of the Jemez volcanic field. These were first transported south by the Jemez River, then transported by wind from the west.

== Fossils ==
The Piera Parada Member contains fossils mostly of camels (Stenomylus, Oxydactylus, and Michenia) and rhinos (Diceratherium.) These are characteristic of the late Arikareean faunal stage, 22 to 19 million years ago.

The Chamisa Mesa Member contains four fossil quarries from which fossils have been found that are characteristic of the Hemingfordian faunal stage, 20.6 to 16.3 million years ago. These include specimens of Menoceras, Protolabis, Aepycamelus, Subparacosoryx, Promartes, Tomarctus, Cynarctoides, and Blickomylus.

== History of investigation ==
The formation was first described by Regan in 1903, who named it the Zia Marl. T. Galusha renamed it the Zia Sand Formation and divided it into the lower Piedra Parada Member and the upper Chamisa Mesa Member. He also recognized a subtle disconformity about 120 m above its base.

In 1981, C.E. Gawne assigned a sequence of reddish beds above the Chamisa Mesa Member to the Zia Formation as the Canada Pilares Member. In 1997, R.H. Tedford and Steven Barghoorn added an additional sequence of beds above the Canada Pilares Member to the Zia Formation as the Cerro Conejo Member. However, two years later, they recommended moving this member into its own formation.

== See also ==
- List of fossiliferous stratigraphic units in New Mexico
- Paleontology in New Mexico
