= Edita Mildažytė =

Lithuanian journalist (born 1966)

Edita Mildažytė (born February 28, 1966) is a Lithuanian journalist, documentarian, and social activist, widely known as the host of the longest running talk show in Lithuanian TV history, "Bėdų turgus" (Buy My Trouble), on air since 2001.

== Early life ==
Mildažytė was born in Kapsukas (now Marijampolė), southern Lithuania, to Vytautas Mildažis and Gražina Marė Petkūnienė.

From 1973–1975, she was a student at Kaunas Vyturis Gymnasium, later continued her studies at Vilnius January 13th Junior High School, from which she graduated in 1984. From 1984–1989, she completed her studies in journalism in the History Faculty of Vilnius University.

== Career ==
=== Television ===
In 1987, Mildažytė won a competition and was selected as an announcer at the Lithuanian public broadcaster, Lithuanian National Radio and Television (LRT). She has worked with LRT's various programs since, including the morning show "Labas rytas" (Good Morning, 1993–1997 as a newsreader), "Vakaro žinios" (Late Night News), corporate entertainment events, national award ceremonies, and live broadcasts including Lithuania joining the European Union (2004), and live coverage of the funeral of Pope John Paul II.

In 1997, Mildažytė launched one of the first TV talk shows in Lithuania, "Bobų vasara". Mildažytė also established a vocal group under the same name, which performed nationally. From 1997–2000, Edita visited various Lithuanian towns performing with the vocal group. From 1999–2001, she also ran a radio program under the same name at the national commercial radio station Radiocentras.

In 2000, Edita Mildažytė edited and presented a public TV show "2 blis" and "Noriu papasakot". From 2005–2007, she produced a CD (Žvaigždės motinoms) and a DVD (Mamų mamai).

=== Music ===
From 2002–2008, Mildažytė produced the television shows "Keliaukim", "Moterys ir vyrai", "Jau saulelė vakarop", and "Pulsas". From 2004–2007, she created the "List of National Values", and prepared it for translation. In 2008, she compiled the first "List of National Treasures", dedicated to Lithuanians par excellence.

In 2005, under Edita's leadership, a concert dedicated to Mother's Day was organized, where local celebrities were performing together with their mothers. From 2003–2008, she produced the annual concerts, "Daugiau saulės, daugiau šviesos" (Let in the sun, let in the light). From 2006–2007, she held an event for "the greatest moms", (mothers who raised 5 or more children).

In 2009, she produced and directed the Millennium of Lithuania Celebration Concert, which was performed in the Cathedral Square, Vilnius. In 2010, Mildažytė wrote the script and conducted the event dedicated to the 20th anniversary of Lithuanian independence from the USSR.

In 2014, Mildažytė directed the quadrennial Lithuanian Song Festival.

== Charity work ==
In 2001, Edita started the Green Apple Donor Appreciation Concert, wherein the Green Apple Award (by sculptor Marius Jonutis) was introduced to honor people for their charity work or the qualities of generosity, decency, etc. Mildažytė started a charity talk show, "Bėdų turgus" (Buy My Trouble), at LRT. The show's concept is to collect dramatic stories (of illness, loss, etc.) from across Lithuania and find a sponsor to "buy" this problem. The show has remained popular since its first broadcast. In 2002, "Bėdų turgus" was established as a charity trust.

Since 2002, Mildažytė has run the charity foundation "Bėdų turgus". According to the 2012 financial report, the trust had distributed donations worth EUR 1.8 million (USD 2 million). In 2007, a subsidiary for Bėdų turgus was launched with the Lithuanian Internet website Diabites, dedicated for procuring insulin pumps for diabetic children. In 2008, Mildažytė visited the United States to fundraise for the Diabites program.

In 2010, the trust organized a fundraising campaign Lithuania-Georgia. One Heart, to support children affected by the war in Georgia after the Russo-Georgian War in 2008. Altogether LTL 247,000 (roughly USD 100,000) was raised during the action.

From 2005–2007, she started "Christmas soup", a charitable collection action. Money collected was donated to the Order of Malta's charity program, "Food on Wheels".

She has also worked to revive Lithuania's ethnographic and culinary traditions, and to promote inter-communal dialogue. During the 2011 Hanukkah, she launched a campaign in the Vilnius' restaurants to promote potato pancakes (Hebrew: לאַטקע, romanized: latke) with cranberry sauce, which feature in both Jewish and Lithuanian cuisine.

In 2011, a monument of philanthropists of the city of Vilnius was unveiled in the city centre, the concept idea by Mildažytė.

== Personal life ==
Mildažytė was married to architect and entrepreneur Gintautas Vyšniauskas. Together they had 5 children. Mildažytė married a TV personality Saulius Plinkus in 2023.

== Awards ==
- V.Raskas award of Lietuvos vaikų fondas, "The Lithuanian children's fund", (2003)
- Order of Concord by Lithuania Concord Foundation (2004)
- Moteris Award for Woman of The Year (2005)
- Order of the Lithuanian Grand Duke Gediminas (State Award) (2007)
- Republic of Georgia Presidential Order of Excellence (2011)
- Citizen of the Year of Estonia (2012)
- Lithuanian National Radio and Television award "Auksinė bitė" as best television show presenter (2014)

== Filmography ==
- Documentary "Algirdas Mykolas Brazauskas" about Lithuania's fourth president since 1918 Algirdas Brazauskas, co-production with R.Sakalauskaitė (2010)
- Documentary "Solo virš Atlanto" about Feliksas Vaitkus, an American born Lithuanian pilot and the world's sixth pilot to fly solo across the Atlantic (2011)
- Documentary "Neokupuotas" about Lithuania freedom fighter Antanas Terleckas, co-production with R.Sakalauskaitė (2012). The film premiered on 11 January 2012.
- Documentary "Fanios Vilnius" about a Holocaust survivor Fania Brantsovskaja (2013)
- Documentary "Vytautas Kasiulis. Iki Paryžiaus ir atgal" about a Lithuania-born painter of the French artistic school "School of Paris" Vytautas Kasiulis s (2013)
- Documentary "Post Scriptum" (2013)
- Documentary "Romain Gary. A Promise Delivered" about a Lithuania-born French writer Romain Gary (2014)
- Documentary "Kazys Napoleonas Kitkauskas. Kertiniai akmenys" about a famous Lithuanian restoration architect (2014)

== Bibliography ==
- Pasimatymas su Lietuva. – Vilnius: Tyto alba, 2011. – 423 p.: iliustr. + 1 garso diskas (CD). – ISBN 978-9986-16-867-6
- Lithuania of a First Date (translated by Diana Bartkutė-Barnard, Joseph Everatt, Andrius Užkalnis and Ada Mykolė Valaitis). – Vilnius: Tyto alba, 2012. – 423 p.: iliustr. + 1 CD. ISBN 978-9986-16-893-5
