= Edita Horrell =

Lithuanian mountaineer

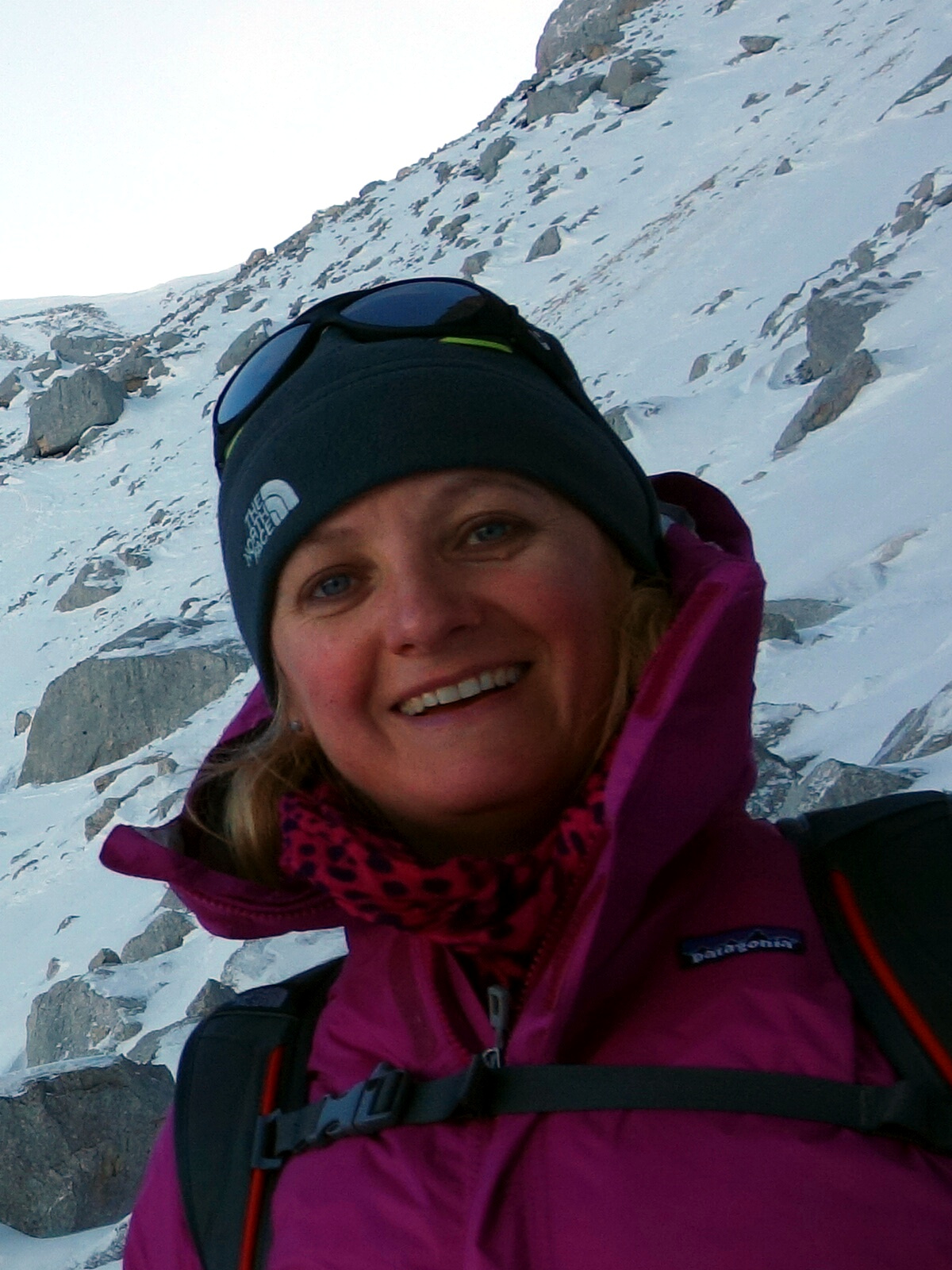
- Born: Lithuania
- Occupations: Mountaineer, Aid worker

Edita Horrell (née Uksaitė), previously known as Edita Nichols, is a Lithuanian-born mountaineer and humanitarian aid worker. She became the first Lithuanian woman to reach the summit of Mount Everest, on 22 May 2013.

== Biography ==
Edita Horrell is a humanitarian aid worker employed by the World Food Programme (WFP), whom she has worked for since 2010. She has been deployed to Haiti, Niger, the Philippines, South Sudan, Zambia, Guinea, Nepal, Ecuador, Chad and the Central African Republic.

She began her career as a mountaineer following her ascent of Kilimanjaro in 2010. She has made successful ascents of three 8000m peaks - Cho Oyu, Manaslu and Everest. She survived an avalanche on Manaslu in 2012, when she was catapulted for several metres inside her tent.

She made two unsuccessful attempts on a fourth 8000m peak, Lhotse, in 2014 and 2015. Both of these expeditions were cut short by major tragedies. In 2015, she narrowly avoided another avalanche at Everest Base Camp, when a 7.8-magnitude earthquake caused a serac to collapse on nearby Pumori. After the earthquake, she spent two months in Nepal working on the emergency response for the World Food Programme.

In 2014, she was part of an international team which measured and identified Mafinga Central as the highest point in Zambia.

In 2016, she was mountaineering in Ecuador when another 7.8-magnitude earthquake struck. Once again she remained in the country to assist with the humanitarian response for WFP.

In September 2017, she made what is believed to be the first ever ascent of Chimborazo from sea to summit, starting from Guayaquil, then completing a full circuit of the mountain before climbing to the summit.

== Successful climbs ==
- 2010 Kilimanjaro (5895 m) Tanzania, the highest mountain in Africa.
- 2011 Mera Peak (6476 m) Nepal.
- 2011 Mont Blanc (4810 m) France, the highest mountain in Western Europe.
- 2011 Cho Oyu (8201 m) Tibet, the sixth highest mountain in the world.
- 2012 Aconcagua (6962 m) Argentina, the highest mountain in South America.
- 2012 Manaslu (8163 m) Nepal, the eighth highest mountain in the world.
- 2013 Mount Everest (8848 m) Tibet, the highest mountain in the world.
- 2016 Cayambe (5790 m) Ecuador, the highest mountain directly on the Equator.
- 2016 and 2017 Chimborazo (6310 m) Ecuador, the highest mountain from the Earth's centre.
- 2016 Antisana (5704 m) Ecuador, the fourth highest mountain in Ecuador.
- 2019 Ojos del Salado (6893 m) Chile, the highest volcano in the world.
