= Consolidation (geology) =

In geology, consolidation is used in several senses:

- Lithification, the overall process of conversion of loose sediments to solid rock.
- Any other process in which loose or fluid material becomes solid rock, such as solidification of magma.
- Compaction (geology), the decrease in volume and increase in density of sediments as the weight of overlying sediments increases, mineral grains move to more compact arrangements, and pore water is expelled. The term is particularly used for soil consolidation.
- Rarely, as a term for the conversion of a mobile belt to a rigid part of a continental platform; an orogeny.
