= Osgyth =

English saint

Saint Osgyth
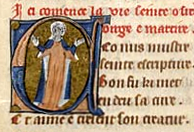
- An illuminated capital commencing the anonymous La Vie seinte Osith, virge e martire (Campsey Manuscript, British Library Additional Ms 70513, fol. 134v)
- Born: Quarrendon, now in Buckinghamshire
- Died: 700 AD
- Venerated in: Eastern Orthodox Church; Catholic Church; Anglicanism
- Canonized: Pre-congregation
- Feast: 7 October
- Attributes: Depicted as a cephalophore; or represented with a stag behind her,

Osgyth (or Osyth; died c. 700 AD) was a Mercian noblewoman and prioress, venerated as an English saint since the 8th century, from soon after her death. She is primarily commemorated in the village of St Osyth, in Essex, near Colchester. Alternative spellings of her name include Sythe, Othith and Ositha. Born of a noble family, she became a nun and founded a priory near Chich which was later named after her.

== Life ==
Born in Quarrendon, Buckinghamshire (at that time part of Mercia), she was the daughter of Frithuwald, a sub-king of Mercia in Surrey. Her mother was Wilburh, of the royal house of Mercia. Her parents, with St Earconwald, founded Chertsey Abbey in 675 AD.

Raised in the care of her maternal aunts, St Edith of Aylesbury and Edburga of Bicester, her ambition was to become an abbess, but she was too important as a political pawn to be set aside. She was forced by her father into a dynastic marriage with Sighere, King of Essex. She is likely the mother of Offa of Essex, although this is not certain.

While her husband was off on a long hunt to run down a beautiful white stag, Osgyth persuaded two local bishops to accept her vows as a nun. Upon his return some days later, he reluctantly agreed to her decision and granted her some land at Chich near Colchester, now named after her as St Osyth, where she established a convent, and ruled as first abbess. She was beheaded by some raiding pirates, perhaps because she may have resisted being carried off.

== Legends ==
One day, Edith sent Osgyth to deliver a book to Modwenna of Northumbria at her nunnery. To get there, Osgyth had to cross a stream by a bridge. The stream was swollen, the wind high, she fell into the water and drowned. Her absence was not noted for two days. Edith thought she was safe with Modwenna who was not expecting her visit. On the third day, Edith, wondering that her pupil had not returned, went to Modwenna. The abbesses were greatly concerned when they discovered Osgyth was apparently lost. They searched for her and found the child lying near the banks of the stream. The abbesses prayed for her restoration and commanded her to arise from the water and come to them. This she did. A similar tale is found in Irish hagiography.

Her later death was accounted a martyrdom by some, but Bede makes no mention of Saint Osgyth. The 13th-century chronicler Matthew Paris repeats some of the legends that had accrued around her name. The site of her martyrdom was transferred to the holy spring at Quarrendon. The holy spring at Quarrendon, mentioned in the time of Osgyth's aunts, now became associated with her legend, in which Osgyth stood up after her execution, picking up her head like Saint Denis of Paris, and other cephalophoric martyrs and walking with it in her hands, to the door of a local convent, before collapsing there. Some modern authors link the legends of cephalophores miraculously walking with their heads in their hands to the Celtic cult of heads.

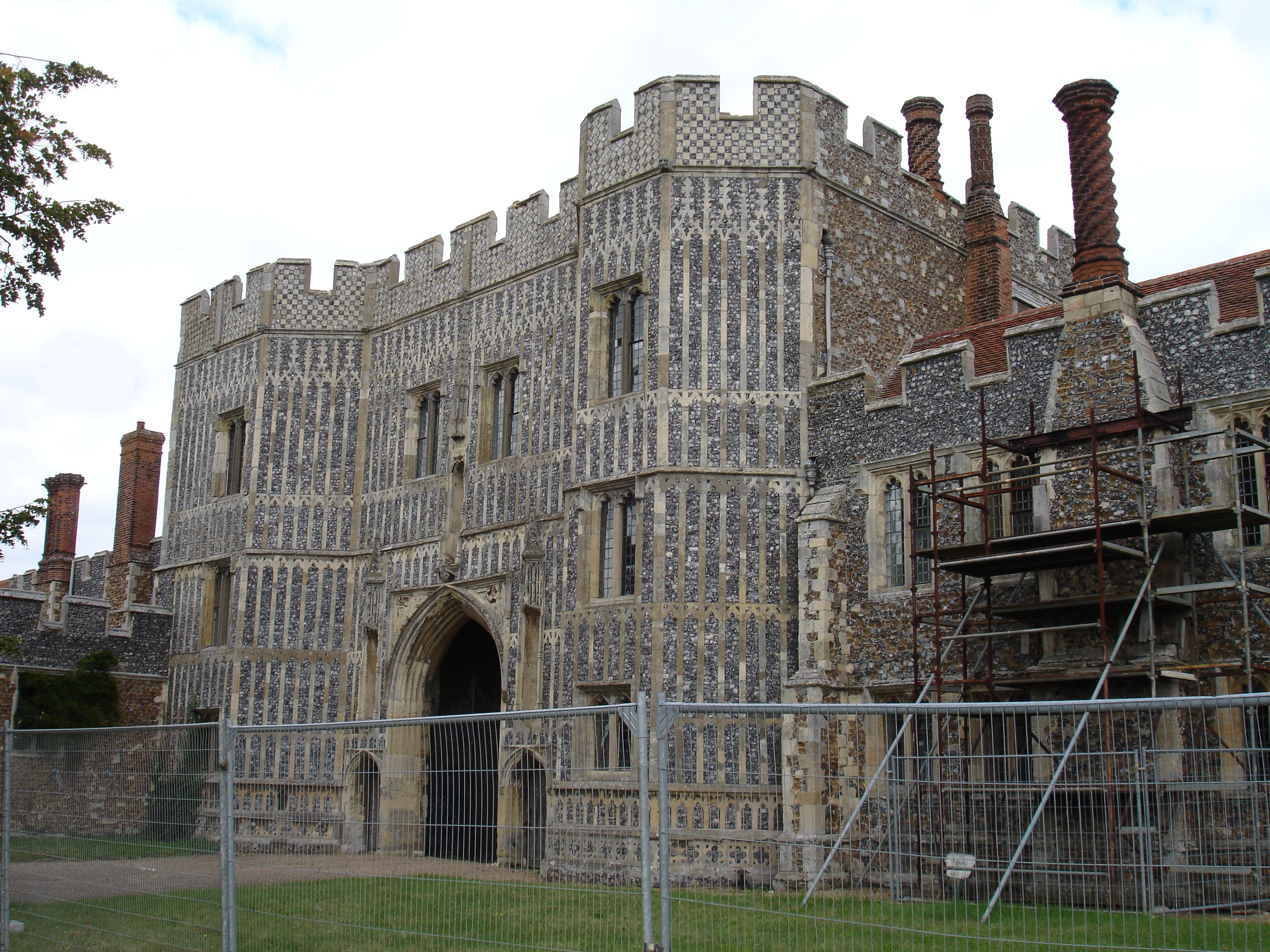
Gatehouse of the former St Osyth's Priory (later abbey), St Osyth, Essex

== Veneration ==
Her cult was promoted by Maurice, bishop of London, where there was a shrine dedicated to her at St Paul's Cathedral.

Around 1121, his successor, Richard de Belmeis I founded a priory for canons of Saint Augustine, on the site of a former nunnery at Chich. He obtained the relic of an arm for the monastery church. His remains were buried in the chancel of the church in 1127: he bequeathed the church and tithes to the canons, who elected as their first abbot or prior William de Corbeil, afterwards Archbishop of Canterbury (died in 1136). Corbeil acquired the other arm for Canterbury.

Benefactions, charters, and privileges granted by Henry II, made the Canons wealthy: at the Dissolution of the monasteries in 1536, priory revenues were valued at £758 5s. 8d. yearly. In 1397 the abbot of St Osgyth was granted the right to wear a mitre and give the solemn benediction, and, more singularly, the right to ordain priests, conferred by Pope Boniface IX. The gatehouse, the so-called 'Abbot's Tower', and some ranges of buildings remain.

Osgyth's burial site at St Mary the Virgin's Church, Aylesbury became a site of great, though unofficial pilgrimage; following a papal decree in 1500, the bones were removed from the church and buried in secret. Undeterred, according to the curious 17th-century antiquary John Aubrey (author of the Brief Lives), "in those days, when they went to bed they did rake up the fire, and make a X on the ashes, and pray to God and Saint Sythe [Saint Osgyth] to deliver them from fire, and from water, and from all misadventure."

Veneration of St Osyth was widespread across England. Norwich Cathedral and St Albans Abbey had chapels dedicated to her in the Middle Ages.

Her feast day is 7 October. She is often depicted carrying her own head.
