= Eadgyth (disambiguation) =

Eadgyth (died 946) was a princess and wife of Holy Roman Emperor Otto I, Holy Roman Emperor.

Eadgyth may also refer to:

- Eadgyth of Aylesbury, saint and daughter of Penda of Mercia
- Eadgyth of Polesworth (fl. early 10th century), thought to be a sister of King Æthelstan and wife to Sihtric Cáech
- Eadgyth of Wilton (died c. 984), saint and daughter of Edgar the Peaceful of England
- Eadgyth (fl. 10–11th century), daughter of King Æthelred the Unready by his first wife Ælfgifu of York and spouse to Eadric Streona

== See also ==
- Edith
