= Quarrendon =

Deserted village in Buckinghamshire, England

Coordinates: 51.832°N 0.833°W

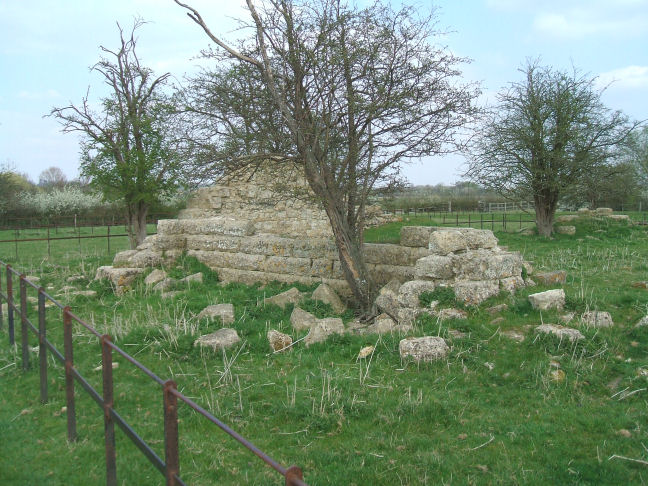
- Ruins of St Peter's parish church

- Location within Buckinghamshire
- Population: 44 (Mid-2010 pop est)
- OS grid reference: SP8015
- Civil parish: Quarrendon
- Unitary authority: Buckinghamshire
- Ceremonial county: Buckinghamshire
- Region: South East
- Country: England
- Sovereign state: United Kingdom
- Post town: Aylesbury
- Postcode district: HP19
- Dialling code: 01296
- Police: Thames Valley
- Fire: Buckinghamshire
- Ambulance: South Central
- UK Parliament: Aylesbury

Quarrendon or Quarrendon Leas is a medieval English village near Aylesbury in Buckinghamshire, England, which has been depopulated since the 16th century and is now a scheduled monument.

== Description ==
Quarrendon's site is now a large area of fields and riverside meadows that provide green space between Meadowcroft and Central on the outskirts of the town of Aylesbury. Visible in these fields and meadows are the remains of a medieval village, a church, a manor house and its moat and a Tudor water garden. These historic features are now nationally-protected as a scheduled monument. The area also has wildlife value with a mixture of habitats and the River Thame forming the southern boundary of the site.

== The deserted village ==
The layout of the village of Quarrendon in the late middle ages is preserved among the earthworks which can be seen in the area today. At this time the village consisted of farmsteads which were clustered around irregularly shaped greens, linked to each other, to their fields and to Aylesbury by sunken roadways. This village had developed over a long period, centuries, during which time the layout and social structure may have changed. The earthworks which form the visible remains are important but below these there are probably more remnants and artefacts which could be excavated by archaeologists in the future. There are also areas that were significant to the village which are outside the boundaries of the scheduled monument, these areas should also be under appropriate management. An example is that of a field containing ridge-and-furrow, which is an indicator of a medieval open field system of farming situated between the scheduled monument and Quarrendon House Farm.

There are two deserted village sites which are considered to both belong a single medieval settlement which shifted, during the medieval period, from a less suitable location. The smaller of the two sites is west of the ruined building of Church Farm and consists of some platforms used to build houses on and a trackway which runs from east to west across the pasture. On the western edge of the pasture is a considerable flat area crossed by a wide street, this may represent pens and a drove way. The second village site is to the east of the smaller site and it is thought that the villagers of the original settlement shifted to this site. The village was probably abandoned around 1485. The layout of streets and houses is clearly represented by the visible earthworks and show a village which covers 25 acres (10 ha) with the streets and crofts radiating out from a pond with a mill and a sunken main street, which runs westwards from the village up the hill to the manor. The ruins of a small 13th-century church, St Peters Chapel can also be made out

== The Tudor manor and water gardens ==
Henry VII confiscated the lands around Quarrendon from the Earl of Warwick in 1499 and a Crown lease of Quarrendon was granted to Richard Lee. Sir Robert Lee, Sheriff of Buckinghamshire, was Richard Lee's son, and he had a new moated house and garden built on the site, the moat survives and is still partially flooded. Sir Robert's grandson, Sir Henry Lee created an elaborate series of gardens delineated by canals and banks after he inherited Quarrendon in 1549. Sir Henry replaced parts of the deserted medieval village with an elaborate rabbit warren as well as a grand water garden with elevated embanked walkways. After Sir Henry died in 1611 Quarrendon declined and the mansion was replaced by a farm.

== Earthwork ==
The Royalist forces in the Battle of Aylesbury on 1 November 1642 used an earthwork in the area of Quarrendon.

== Notable people ==
- St Osyth, a Mercian princess, was born at Quarrendon palace
