= Hayner Ranch Formation =

Geologic formation in New Mexico, USA

- Stratigraphic range: Miocene
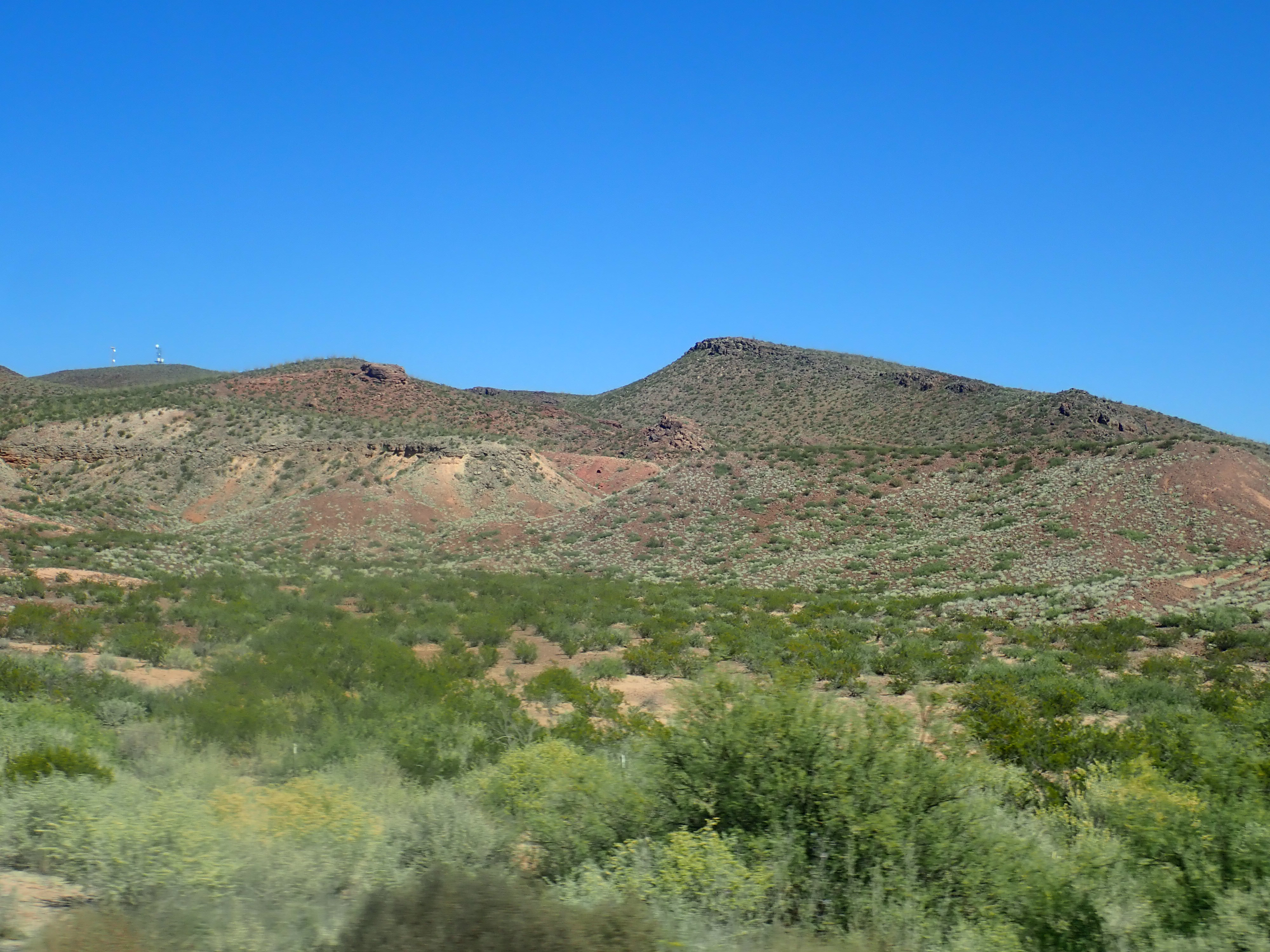
- Dark beds of the Hayner Ranch Formation exposed in the Rincon Hills, New Mexico, USA
- Type: Formation
- Unit of: Santa Fe Group (geology)
- Underlies: Rincon Valley Formation
- Overlies: Spears Group
- Thickness: 2,800 meters (9,200 ft)

Lithology
- Primary: conglomerate, mudstone, sandstone

Location
- Coordinates: 32.5942°N 106.9791°W
- Region: New Mexico
- Country: United States

Type section
- Named for: Hayner Ranch
- Named by: Seager et al.
- Year defined: 1971
- Hayner Ranch Formation (the United States) Hayner Ranch Formation (New Mexico)

The Hayner Ranch Formation is a geologic formation found near the San Diego Mountains of New Mexico. It is estimated to have been deposited during the Miocene epoch.

== Description ==
The Hayner Ranch Formation consists of about 2,800 feet (850 m) of red to tan volcaniclastic conglomerate, mudstone, and sandstone. It is the lowest formation of the Santa Fe Group in the San Diego Mountains area, overlying older volcanic rock of the Spears Group. The formation fills paleovalleys eroded in the underlying volcanic beds.

The formation is particularly well exposed in a half graben between the East and West Selden Hills; in Selden Canyon to the west; at its type section in the Tonuco Uplift; and in the Rincon Hills to the north, where it is coarser (including boulder conglomerates) and partially silicified. The formation is interpreted as stream and floodplain deposits near the axis of a broad closed basin. The narrow (12 km) half graben is tilted to the northeast and has its footwall on the Caballo Mountains block, where displacement was about 1,615 meters (5,299 ft). Study of the formation and others in the area support at least four episodes of block faulting starting 35 million years ago, almost all along faults trending north–south.

The formation records the unroofing of the Caballo Mountains. Clasts in the lower part of the formation are derived from the underlying Spears Group and those higher in the formation from the Eocene Palm Park and Love Ranch Formations. However, clasts from the Doña Ana Mountains are absent from the formation, showing that these mountains had not yet been unroofed during deposition of the formation.

The formation has been studied as a model for the critical early stages of diagenesis of continental red beds of Pennsylvanian to Triassic age. and as a model for diagenesis in the Santa Fe Group.

== History of investigation ==
The formation was first defined by Seager et al. in 1971, and assigned to the Santa Fe Group.
