= Sanders Canyon Formation =

Geologic formation in New Mexico, USA

- Stratigraphic range: Late Eocene; 43–38 Ma
- Type: Formation
- Underlies: Sierra Blanca Volcanics
- Overlies: Cub Mountain Formation
- Thickness: 150 m (490 ft)

Lithology
- Primary: Volcaniclastics

Location
- Coordinates: 33.507°N 105.857°W
- Region: New Mexico
- Country: United States

Type section
- Named for: Sanders Canyon (33.522°N 105.903°W)
- Named by: S.M. Cather
- Year defined: 1991
- Sanders Canyon Formation (the United States) Sanders Canyon Formation (New Mexico)

The Sanders Canyon Formation is a geologic formation exposed north and west of the Sierra Blanca of southern New Mexico. It preserves fossils dating back to the Eocene epoch.

== Description ==
The formation consists of volcaniclastic mudstone (70%) and sandstone (30%), with less sandstone in the higher beds. The grayish-purpose color contrasts with the reddish color of the underlying Cub Mountain Formation and reflects a content of greater than 25% volcanic debris. The upper beds interfinger with the overlying Sierra Blanca Volcanics. Total thickness is about 150 meters (490 ft) at the type section, but total thickness may be as much as 400 meters (1,300 ft).

The formation is part of the only extensive exposures of Cretaceous and Paleogene rocks in a large area of south-central and southeastern New Mexico. It is interpreted as sediments deposited by north-northeast-flowing streams. It may correlate with the Palm Park Formation and Rubio Peak Formation, and the overlying Sierra Blanca Volcanics have a maximum age of 38 million years, suggesting the age of the Sanders Canyon Formation is between 43 million and 38 million years.

== History of investigation ==
The formation was first defined by Steven M. Cather in 1991, from beds formerly assigned to the Cub Mountain Formation. The formation was named for Sanders Canyon, just north of the type section.
