= Kneeling Nun Tuff =

Geologic formation in New Mexico, USA

- Stratigraphic range: late Eocene; 35.3 Ma
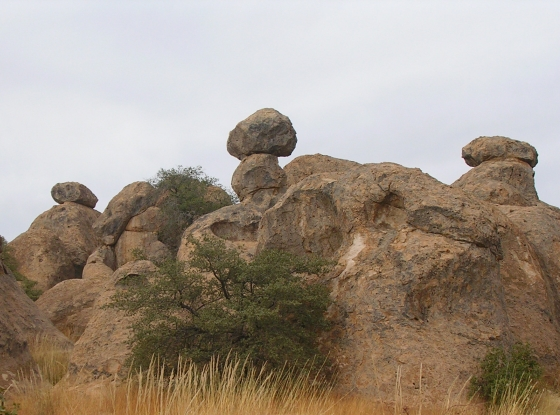
- Kneeling Nun Tuff at City of Rocks State Park, New Mexico
- Type: Geologic formation
- Unit of: Datil Group
- Overlies: Sugarlump Tuff; Rubio Peak Formation
- Thickness: 1,000 ft (300 m)

Lithology
- Primary: Ignimbrite

Location
- Coordinates: 32.784°N 108.050°W
- Region: New Mexico
- Country: United States

Type section
- Named for: Kneeling Nun rock monument (32.784°N 108.050°W)
- Named by: H.K. Jicha, Jr.
- Year defined: 1954
- Kneeling Nun Tuff (the United States) Kneeling Nun Tuff (New Mexico)

The Kneeling Nun Tuff is a geologic formation exposed in southwest New Mexico. It has a radiometric age of 35.3 million years, corresponding to the latest Eocene epoch.

The formation consists of over 900 cubic kilometers (220 cu mi) of tuff erupted by the Emory caldera of the Mogollon-Datil volcanic field. It has been studied by geologists seeking to understand the processes whereby supereruptions are triggered.

== Description ==
The formation consists of reddish brown to pinkish gray tuff containing numerous visible crystals (phenocrysts), up to 3 millimeters (0.12 in) in size, composed of quartz, lesser amounts of sanidine and plagioclase feldspar, and minor biotite. At the type location, the tuff has pronounced columnar jointing and faint horizontal sheeting. The overall composition of the tuff is largely rhyolitic, but with some quartz latite beds.

The formation was erupted from the Emory caldera (33°N 107.75°W) of the Mogollon-Datil volcanic field. It includes an intracaldera facies that is over 1,000 meters (3,300 ft) in thickness and an outflow facies up to 150 meters (490 ft) thick. The outflow sheet extends as far as 30 kilometers (19 mi) from the caldera margins. The Kneeling Nun Tuff overlies the Sugarlump Tuff, whose eruption vents have not been confidently identified, and the Rubio Peak Formation. It is possible that the low-volume Sugarlump Tuff represents early leakage from the same magma chamber as the Kneeling Nun Tuff. The Kneeling Nun Tuff interfingers with the Bell Top Formation, forming the #5 tuff bed within the Bell Top.

The Kneeling Nun Tuff has a radiometric age of 35.299 ± 0.039 million years. Over 900 cubic kilometers (220 cu mi) of tuff was emplaced by the supereruption, which emptied a magma chamber in the upper crust that had formed over a time period of more than a million years. During most of this period, the magma chamber was filled with a crystal mush, consisting of over 50% solid crystals suspended in liquid magma, but during the 50,000 years immediately preceding the eruption, this magma was mobilized by increased recharge of the magma chamber that reduced the crystal fraction to under 50%.

The eruption of the Emory caldera was followed by formation of a resurgent dome as the caldera floor was pushed back upwards by fresh injections of magma. Thick beds of densely welded intracaldera Kneeling Nun Tuff are exposed in the heavy faulted resurgent dome, which forms the core of the Black Range.

== History of investigation ==
The unit was first defined by H.L. Jicha, Jr., in 1954 for exposures in the Santa Rita, New Mexico area. These include the Kneeling Nun, a prominent natural rock feature overlooking the town, for which the unit was named. The unit was assigned to the Datil Group by Ratte and coinvestigators in 1991.
