= Baca Formation =

Geologic formation in New Mexico and Arizona, USA

- Stratigraphic range: Eocene
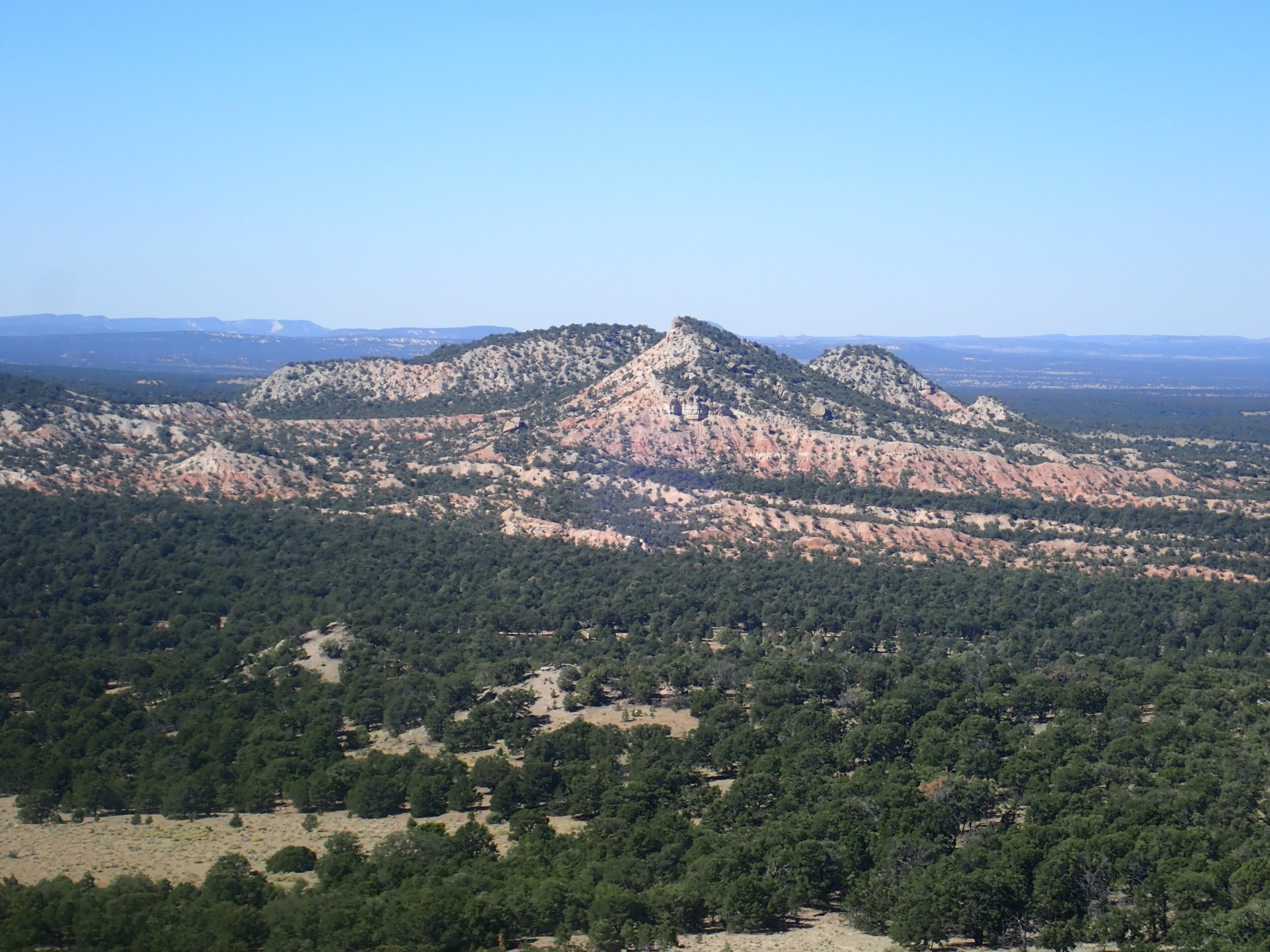
- Red beds of the Baca Formation in the Sawtooth Mountains of New Mexico
- Type: Formation
- Underlies: Spears Formation
- Overlies: Mesaverde Group
- Thickness: 694 feet (212 m)

Lithology
- Primary: Conglomerate
- Other: Sandstone, claystone

Location
- Coordinates: 34.332°N 107.272°W
- Region: New Mexico
- Country: United States

Type section
- Named for: Baca Canyon
- Named by: R.H. Wilpolt et al.
- Year defined: 1946
- Baca Formation (the United States) Baca Formation (New Mexico)

The Baca Formation is a geologic formation in southern New Mexico and Arizona. It preserves fossils dating back to the Eocene period.

== Description ==
The formation consists of coarse conglomerate, red and white sandstone, and red clay. Its total thickness is 694 feet (212 m), of which 80–140 feet (24–43 m) is conglomerate. The formation rests unconformably on the Cretaceous Mesaverde Group and is overlain by the Oligocene Spears Formation.

The formation was deposited in a basin that developed in Eocene time in eastern Arizona and west-central New Mexico. The basin was mostly a system of braided streams subject to frequent flash floods, with meandering streams restricted to the easternmost part of the basin. Paleocurrent directions showed that stream flow was generally to the east-northeast. Shallow floodplain lakes and a large, shallow closed lake in the eastern part of the basin were also present, though lacustrine beds are nearly absent due to extensive river delta formation. Deposition ended with the eruption of the Mogollon-Datil volcanic field, which disrupted the Baca drainage and buried the basin in volcaniclastic rock.

== Fossils ==
The formation is relatively poor in vertebrate fossils, and only six of biostratigraphic significance have been found. These are the titanotheres Paleosyops and Manteoceras, an artiodactyl fossil trackway and Protoreodon fossil, and a small mammalian fauna at Mariano Mesa. The titanotheres are characteristic of the Bridgerian age while the trackways indicate a late Eocene age or younger.

== History of investigation ==
The formation was first described by R.H. Wilpolt and his coinvestigators in 1946 and named for exposures in Baca Canyon in the Bear Mountains.

== See also ==
- List of fossiliferous stratigraphic units in New Mexico
- Paleontology in New Mexico
