= Love Ranch Formation =

Geologic formation in New Mexico, USA

- Stratigraphic range: late Paleocene–early Eocene
- Type: Formation
- Underlies: Palm Park Formation, Rubio Peak Formation
- Overlies: McRae Formation
- Thickness: 2,100 feet (640 m)

Lithology
- Primary: Conglomerate
- Other: Siltstone, sandstone

Location
- Coordinates: 32.5506°N 106.5780°W
- Region: New Mexico
- Country: United States

Type section
- Named for: Love Ranch
- Named by: Kottlowski, Flower, Thompson, and Foster
- Year defined: 1956
- Love Ranch Formation (the United States) Love Ranch Formation (New Mexico)

The Love Ranch Formation is a geologic formation in southern New Mexico. It was likely deposited during the late Paleocene and early Eocene epochs.

== Description ==
The formation consists of boulder conglomerate interbedded with calcareous reddish siltstone and poorly-sorted, coarse-grained, arkosic sandstone. The lower beds tend to be more coarse. The formation is exposed in the western foothills of the San Andres Mountains and Organ Mountains. The formation unconformably overlies the McRae Formation and is conformably overlain by the Palm Park Formation or Rubio Peak Formation.

The formation is interpreted as alluvial fans and stream and playa deposits of sediments eroded from the Laramide Rio Grande uplift. This uplift dates to the latest Cretaceous and was initially tilted gently to the northeast, where McRae Formation beds accumulated in a shallow Love Ranch basin. Tectonism paused for perhaps 10 million years, producing an unconformity that separates the McRae from the Love Ranch Formation. The clasts within the conglomerate beds of the formation record the progressive erosion of beds from the uplift backwards in time, from Cretaceous volcanic clasts at the base of the formation to Precambrian clasts in its upper beds. The formation covered all but the highest ground in the uplift, which was subsequently completely buried by volcaniclastics and flows of the Mogollon-Datil volcanic field.

Palynomorphs from a buried section of the formation suggest its age is late Paleocene to early Eocene.

== Fossils ==
The only fossils found in the formation are plant fragments.

== History of investigation ==
The formation was first named by F.E. Kottlowski and coinvestigators in 1956 for exposures near the headquarters of Love Ranch, northeast of Las Cruces, New Mexico.

== See also ==
- List of fossiliferous stratigraphic units in New Mexico
- Paleontology in New Mexico
