= Cub Mountain Formation =

Geologic formation in New Mexico, US

- Stratigraphic range: Eocene; 50–47.7 Ma
- Type: Formation
- Underlies: Sanders Canyon Formation
- Overlies: Crevasse Canyon Formation

Lithology
- Primary: Sandstone, mudstone
- Other: Conglomerate

Location
- Coordinates: 33.520700°N 105.914505°W
- Region: New Mexico
- Country: United States

Type section
- Named for: Cub Mountain
- Named by: H.R. Weber
- Year defined: 1964
- Cub Mountain Formation (the United States) Cub Mountain Formation (New Mexico)

The Cub Mountain Formation is a geologic formation in southern New Mexico. It preserves fossils dating back to the Eocene epoch. The formation also records the progressive unroofing of nearby mountainous uplifts during the Laramide orogeny.

== Description ==
The formation consists of interbedded gray to red sandstone and mudstone with minor conglomerate with a total thickness of 730 meters (2,400 ft). This is the greatest exposed interval of Eocene basin sediments found in New Mexico. Sandstone dominates the lower part of the formation, but the fraction of mudstone increases further up in the formation. The formation disconformably rests on the Crevasse Canyon Formation of the Mesaverde Group and conformably underlies the Sanders Canyon Formation. In the vicinity of Sierra Blanca, the formation is intruded by dikes with K-Ar ages of 47.7 +/-2.9 Ma (million years ago).

The formation is interpreted as deposited in a braided stream environment. The lowermost beds contain pebbles similar to those of the underlying Crevasse Canyon Formation, suggesting these beds include reworked sediments from the underlying formation. The composition of the upper beds records progressive unroofing of nearby mountainous uplifts during the Laramide orogeny, with decreasing amounts of sandstone fragments and increasing amounts of basement rock fragments.

== Fossils ==
Fossil turtles have been found towards the base of the formation. These are characteristic of the Wasatchian-Bridgerian boundary at about 50 Ma.

== History of investigation ==
The first definition of the formation was credited to H.R. Weber in a publication by M.W. Bodine, Jr., in 1956, but Weber did not publish a type section until 1964. The formation is named after an isolated peak in southern New Mexico.

Kenneth Segerstrom and his coinvestigators argued in 1979 that the beds of the Cub Mountain Formation properly belong to the Cretaceous McRae Formation. Spencer G. Lucas and his coinvestigators disagreed on the basis of fossil evidence, placing the formation in the Eocene. Steven M. Cather removed the uppermost fine-grained volcaniclastic beds in the formation as originally defined into their own formation, the Sanders Canyon Formation, in 1991.

== See also ==
- List of fossiliferous stratigraphic units in New Mexico
- Paleontology in New Mexico
