= City of Rocks =

City of Rocks may refer to:

- City of Rocks National Reserve, Idaho, USA
- City of Rocks State Park, New Mexico, USA
