= Spears Group =

Group of geologic formations in New Mexico, USA

- Stratigraphic range: Eocene to Oligocene; 39–33 Ma
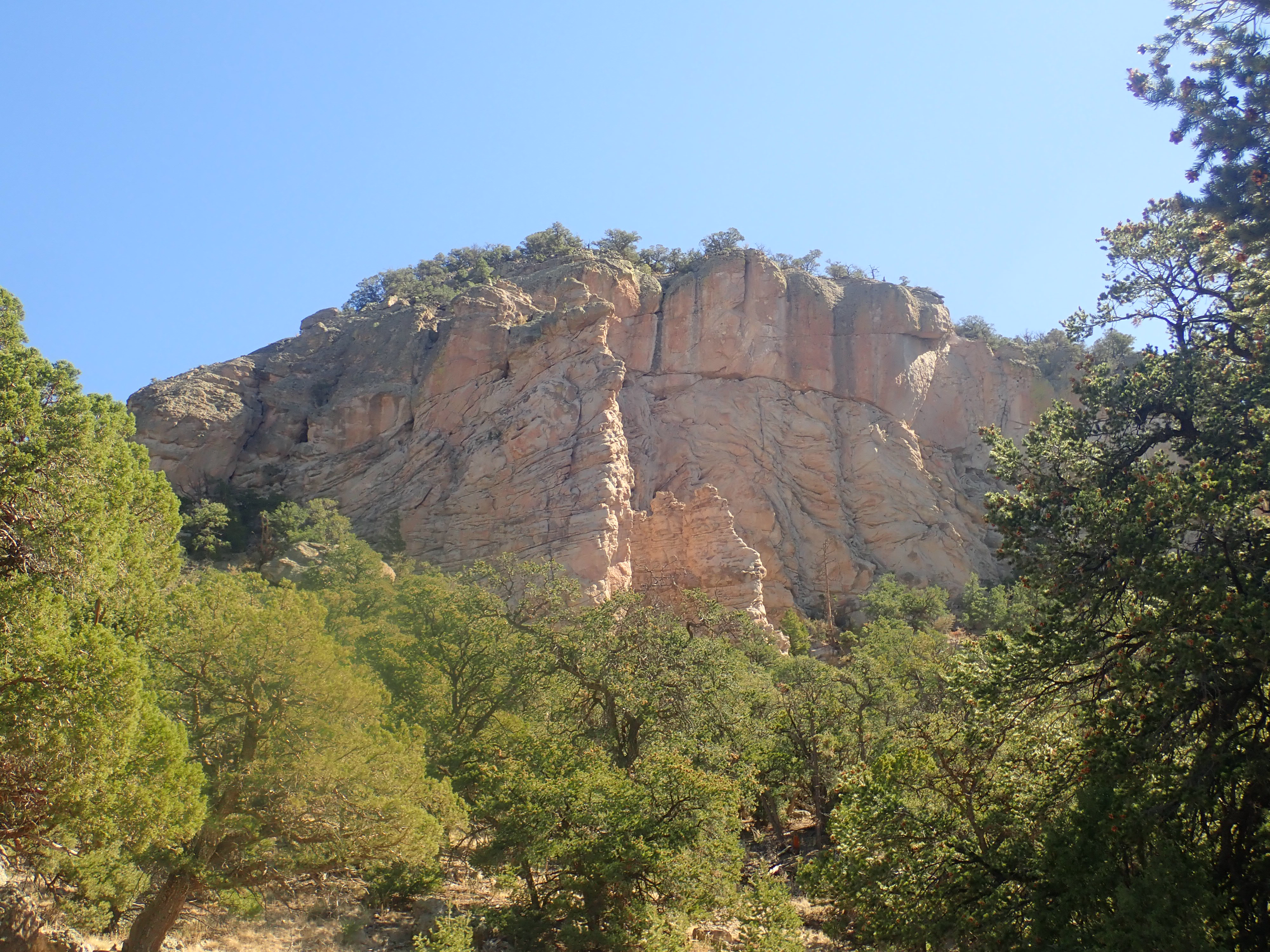
- Dog Springs Formation in the Sawtooth Mountains of New Mexico
- Type: Group
- Sub-units: See text
- Underlies: Fence Lake Formation; Hayner Ranch Formation
- Overlies: Baca Formation
- Thickness: 3,000 ft (910 m)

Lithology
- Primary: Volcaniclastics
- Other: Andesite

Location
- Coordinates: 34.281°N 107.296°W
- Region: New Mexico
- Country: United States

Type section
- Named by: Tonking
- Year defined: 1957
- Spears Group (the United States) Spears Group (New Mexico)

The Spears Group is a group of geologic formations exposed in and around the northeast Mogollon-Datil volcanic field of southwestern New Mexico. It has a radiometric age of 33 to 39 million years, corresponding to the Eocene to Oligocene epochs.

== Description ==
The group is composed primarily of volcaniclastic beds, deposited in alluvial fans or braided streams, with minor basaltic andesite to dacite lava flows. It contains some lacustrine delta deposits at its base. The total thickness is as much as 3,000 feet (910 m). The group grades below into the Baca Formation and interfingers with lava flows and ash flow sheets of the Mogollon Group and Datil Group.

K-Ar and fission track dating suggest an age of 33 to 39 million years.

The Dog Springs Formation shows striking sedimentary structure indicating that the debris flow beds making up most of the formation slumped over distance scales of miles on the underlying Baca Formation beds. In some locations, clastic dikes derived from the Baca Formation penetrate the overlying Dog Springs Formation.

=== Formations ===
The group is divided into numerous formations. In descending stratigraphic order, these are:

- South Crosby Peak Formation
- Rincon Windmill Formation
- Chavez Canyon Formation
- Dog Springs Formation
- Rubio Peak Formation
- Palm Park Formation
- Pueblo Creek Formation
- Bell Top Formation
- Rock Springs Formation

In addition, a number of informal units have been described within the group.

== History of investigation ==
The name was first used by W.H. Tonking in 1957 for the lowest beds of the Datil Volcanics (as then designated). G.R. Osburn and C.E. Chapin raised the unit to formation rank within the Datil Group and divided into members separated by ash flow sheets. In 1994, Steven M. Cather and coinvestigators raised the Spears Formation to group rank and its members to formation rank, redefining the group as all volcaniclastic apron sediments of the Mogollon-Datil volcanic field. They also described several informal formations within the group.
