= List of peaks named Indian =

Mountains named Indian Peak or variations.

== Canada ==
In Canada, according to NRCan CGNDB:

Name	CGNDB link	Province	Region	NTS map	Coordinates
Indian Peak		British Columbia	Kootenay Land District	082J13	50°55′48″N 115°45′2″W
Indian Peak		Nova Scotia	Guysborough	011F03	Scotia 45°13′31″N 61°27′26″W

== United States ==
In the United States, according to USGS GNIS:

Name	USGS link	State	County	Coordinates
Indian Peak		Arizona	Greenlee	33°46′2″N 109°6′41″W
Indian Peak		Arizona	Greenlee	33°33′36″N 109°17′7″W
Indian Peak		Arizona	Yavapai	34°55′57″N 112°48′41″W
Indian Peak		California	Mariposa	37°23′34″N 119°48′42″W
Indian Peak		California	Mariposa	37°26′6″N 120°11′20″W
Indian Peak		California	Mono	37°41′29″N 118°18′48″W
Indian Peak		Colorado	Mesa	39°11′34″N 108°8′6″W
Indian Peak		Idaho	Idaho	45°57′1″N 115°6′3″W
Indian Peak		Idaho	Lemhi	45°29′26″N 114°6′26″W
Indian Peak		Idaho	Shoshone	47°4′59″N 115°19′39″W
Indian Peak		Idaho	Valley	44°54′59″N 115°36′45″W
Indian Peak		Montana	Lincoln	48°39′18″N 115°43′39″W
Indian Peak		Montana	Phillips	47°54′31″N 108°38′55″W
Indian Peak		Nebraska	Saunders	41°25′53″N 96°46′58″W
Indian Peak		Nevada	Lander	39°17′1″N 117°38′27″W
Indian Peak		Nevada	Lincoln	38°1′59″N 115°5′42″W
Indian Peak		Nevada	Pershing	40°22′9″N 118°10′57″W
Indian Peak		New Mexico	Catron	33°29′59″N 108°58′22″W
Indian Peak		New Mexico	Catron	33°18′39″N 108°40′41″W
Indian Peak		New Mexico	Catron	34°10′31″N 107°50′28″W
Indian Peak		New Mexico	Grant	32°40′27″N 108°21′38″W
Indian Peak		New Mexico	Hidalgo	31°49′18″N 108°54′24″W
Indian Peak		New Mexico	Sierra	33°7′18″N 107°40′8″W
Indian Peak		New Mexico	Sierra	33°7′18″N 107°40′8″W
Indian Peak		New Mexico	Sierra	33°7′18″N 107°40′8″W
Indian Peak		Texas	Blanco	30°26′3″N 98°33′44″W
Indian Peak		Texas	Briscoe	34°33′53″N 101°9′20″W
Indian Peak		Texas	El Paso	31°54′23″N 106°29′6″W
Indian Peak		Texas	Jeff Davis	30°35′52″N 104°41′8″W
Indian Peak		Texas	Jeff Davis	30°53′28″N 104°3′30″W
Indian Peak		Utah	Beaver	38°16′1″N 113°52′31″W
Indian Peak		Utah	Millard	38°40′43″N 112°19′43″W
Indian Peak		Utah	Sevier	38°33′23″N 111°57′43″W
Indian Peak		Wyoming	Albany	42°10′46″N 105°34′51″W
Indian Peak		Wyoming	Lincoln	43°16′10″N 110°55′9″W
Indian Peak		Wyoming	Park	44°46′39″N 109°51′12″W
