= Faywood Hot Springs =

Thermal springs in New Mexico, US

- Bull Spring; Mimbres Hot Springs; Hudson Hot Springs
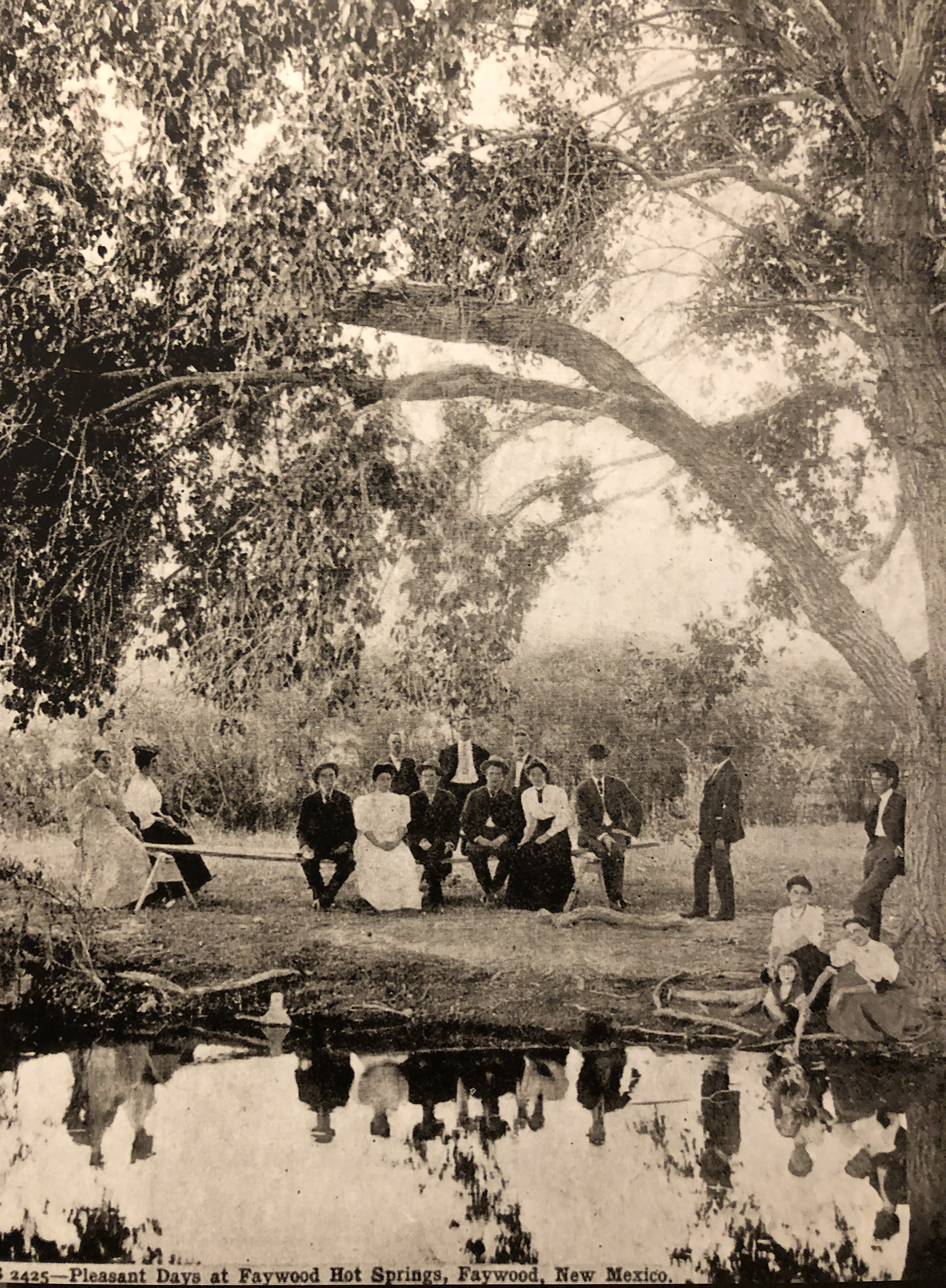
- "Pleasant Days at the Faywood Hot Springs", August 4, 1915, by Thomas K. Todsen
- Interactive map of Faywood Hot Springs
- Location: Grant County, New Mexico
- Coordinates: 32°33′27.03″N 107°59′34.13″W
- Elevation: 5,782 feet (1,762 m)
- Type: geothermal spring
- Discharge: 6,000 US gallons (23,000 L; 5,000 imp gal) per hour
- Temperature: 142 °F (61 °C)

Faywood Hot Springs, (also known as Bull Spring, Mimbres Hot Springs and Hudson Hot Springs), are thermal springs in Grant County, New Mexico, United States. It is located 2 miles (3.2 km) northeast of US 180 and .5 miles (0.80 km) west of NM 61, just south of the City of Rocks State Park. The hot springs have been visited since the time of the Mimbres culture. It was a successful resort in the late 19th century and early 20th century. In 1952, the establishment was demolished and became a ghost town. The land was purchased in 1993 and developed into a hot springs resort again.

== Geography and geology ==
The hot springs are located at an altitude of 5,782 feet (1,762 m) and sheltered from heavy winds by nearby mountains. In 1903 and 1904, it was reported that the springs flowed through a cone of hardened minerals .5 miles (0.80 km) in circumference and 40 feet (12 m) high at the rate of 6,000 U.S. gallons (23,000 liters; 5,000 imperial gallons) per hour. The water was analyzed and found to be alkaline, with 39.59 grains of solids per gallon. It contains soda, and to a lesser extent, alumina, carbonates, chlorides, iron, magnesium, potash, silica, and sulfates. With a temperature of 142 °F (61 °C) degrees, it was described as one of the Southwest's hottest spring water. In 2001, the temperature of the source spring water was measured at 129 °F (54 °C) degrees.

== History ==
=== Prehistory and early historic periods ===
There is evidence that people of the Mimbres culture used the springs. Mortar holes were found that were used for grinding food. During construction in 1896, archaeological evidence of prehistoric stone and flint tools, pottery, and copper spoons were found near the springs.

Apaches and other Native Americans visited the site. Also during the 1896 construction, human bones were found in the spring. They were believed to be those of an Apache man who was injured near the springs during an intercepted raid of a settler's family and thrown into the hot spring by a cavalry soldier, who was later acquitted but court-martialed. Spanish explorers, miners, and buffalo hunters also came to the hot springs.

=== Ghost town ===
The site was first called Ojo Toro (bull spring) by Captain Martinez when he stopped at the site and saw bulls watering at the springs in 1785. It was called Ojo Caliente (hot eye/spring) in 1851 by US Boundary Commission's John Bartlett.

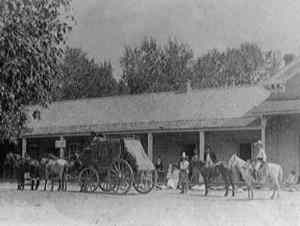
Hudson store at Hudson Hot Springs

In 1859, a hotel and bath house called Hotel of Accommodation was built by former El Paso, Texas sheriffs William Watts and A. Kuhne. Grant County was founded in 1868. The property was acquired by Colonel Richard Hudson, the county's first sheriff, and by 1878 was named Mimbres Hot Springs. The following year it was renamed Hudson Hot Springs and had a post office of that name until 1881. That year, Hudson began construction on a hotel that was completed in 1884. In 1890, the hotel burned down.

Andrew Graham owned the property in 1894 and by 1896 completed the 60-room Casa del Consuelo (House of Delight), which was considered the "fanciest hotel in New Mexico Territory" according to Robert Hixson Julyan. By 1897 there were 35 residents of Hudson Hot Springs. Visitors and mail arrived at the Atchison, Topeka and Santa Fe Railway's Hudson station, which was five miles (Note: It is also said to have been three miles from the Faywood station in 1904, when the resort and site was called Faywood Hot Springs.) from the site. There were limited public school and church services for residents. The area economy was supported by agriculture, livestock, and tourism. The minerals in the hot springs were said to help heal rheumatic, stomach, skin, blood and kidney diseases.

By 1900, it was developed by three men: J.C. Fay, William Lockwood, and T.C. McDermott. Fay and Lockwood's names were combined to create the "Faywood" name. McDermott was the only partner to remain at the resort. The Faywood Hot Springs Hotel, which could serve up to 125 guests, was one-storied, with a three-sided courtyard and an almost 900 feet (270 m) long veranda. The hotel had a large dining room, parlors, a writing room, barber shop, gun room, and a billiard room. Spring water was cooled and piped into the hotel rooms and bath houses. Guest rooms had outdoor entrances and large windows, hot and cold water, and many rooms could be heated by piped water from the thermal springs. In 1904, in a report by the Governor of New Mexico to the Secretary of the Interior, Faywood was identified as one of the more popular hot springs sites with "excellent hotel accommodations." McDermott lived on the property until 1947, when he died at the age of 97. The resort was popular during World War I, but patronage later declined. In 1952, the hotel was demolished, except for the adobe foundation.

After the hotel was razed, the land was owned by the Chino Mines. In 1966 it was owned by Kennecott Copper, who later sold it to the Phelps Dodge Company. They held it until 1993 when the property was purchased by Elon Yurwit and Wanda Fuselier.

=== Redevelopment ===
The hot springs have been used commercially since 1993 as a private resort. The temperature of public pools range from 95 to 110 °F (35 to 43 °C) degrees. There are swimsuit-required and swimsuit-optional public pools, as well as private pools. Tent and recreational vehicle camping and cabins exist at the site.
