= Bell Top Formation =

Geologic formation in New Mexico

- Stratigraphic range: Oligocene
- Type: Formation
- Unit of: Spears Group
- Underlies: Mogollon Group
- Overlies: Palm Park Formation, Datil Group
- Thickness: 800 feet (240 m)

Lithology
- Primary: Volcaniclastic

Location
- Coordinates: 32.4963°N 107.1181°W
- Region: New Mexico
- Country: United States

Type section
- Named for: Bell Top Mountain
- Named by: Kottlowski
- Year defined: 1953
- Bell Top Formation (the United States) Bell Top Formation (New Mexico)

The Bell Top Formation is a geologic formation in southern New Mexico. Radiometric dating of surrounding tuffs indicate that it was deposited in the Oligocene epoch.

== Description ==
The formation consists of tuffaceous sandstone and minor conglomerate. These are interbedded with volcanic tuffs and flows that are assigned to the Mogollon Group. Total thickness may be as much as 800 feet (240 m). In the southeastern part of the Mogollon-Datil volcanic field, the upper beds of the Bell Top Formation define the break between the Mogollon Group and the Datil Group. Here the Bell Top rests on the 33.51 Ma Box Canyon Tuff, the uppermost unit of the Datil Group, and below the 28.56 Ma Vicks Peak Tuff, the lowest tuff of the Mogollon Group. In other locations, it overlies the Palm Park Formation.

The formation has been interpreted as sediments eroded from caldera rims of the Mogollon-Datil volcanic field. Oxygen isotope ratios suggest that the magma from which the caldera rims solidified had its origin in the Earth's crust as a partial melt of granite source rock.

== History of investigation ==
The formation was first named by F.E. Kottlowski in 1953 for exposures around Bell Top Mountain, northwest of Las Cruces, New Mexico. His definition included both igneous beds and sedimentary beds in the formation. Steven M. Cather and his coinvestigators argued in 1994 for a revision of southwestern New Mexico stratigraphy in which the Bell Top Formation was restricted to the sedimentary beds and included in the Spears Group.
