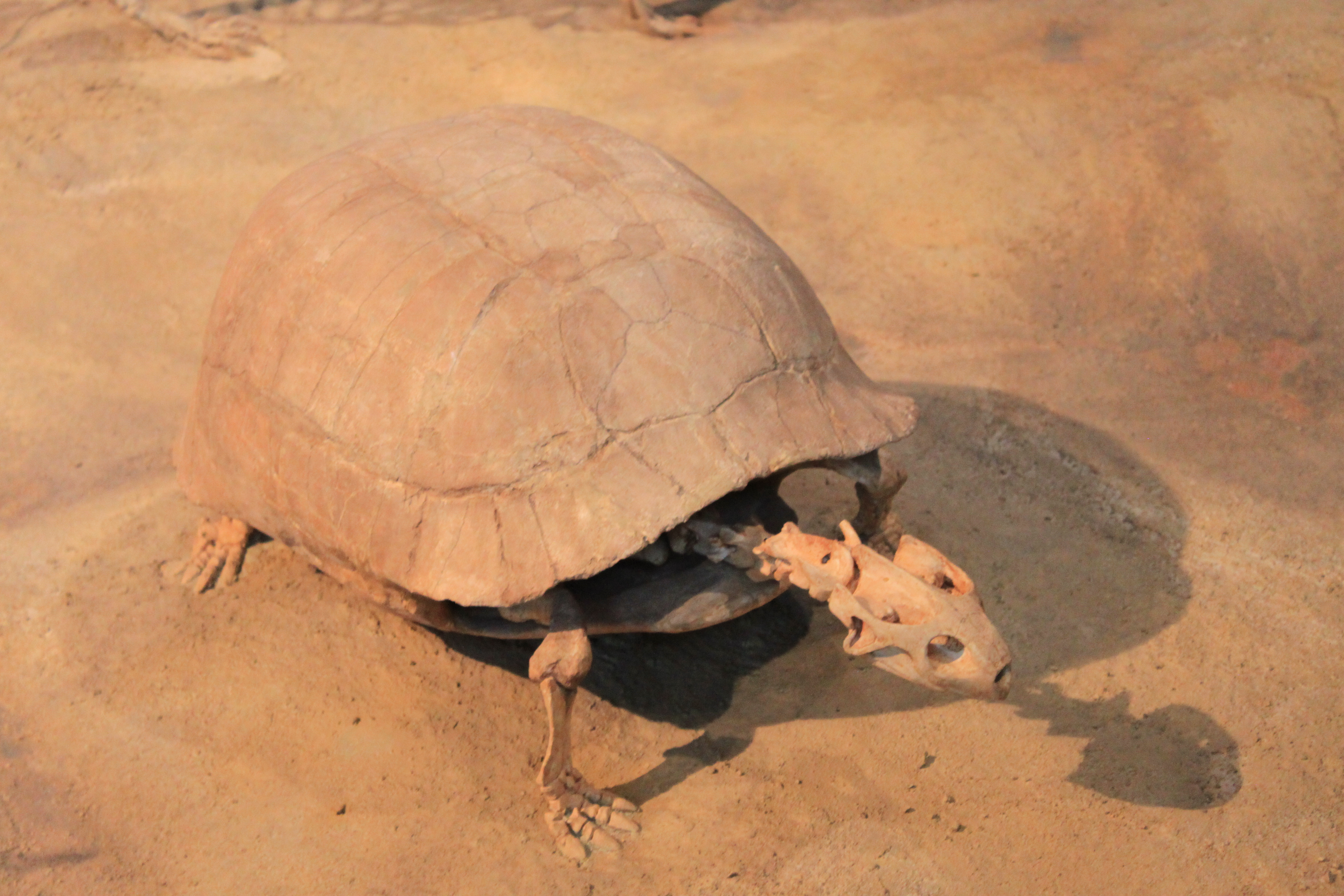
- Skeleton

Scientific classification
- Kingdom: Animalia
- Phylum: Chordata
- Class: Reptilia
- Order: Testudines
- Suborder: Cryptodira
- Family: Testudinidae
- Genus: †Stylemys; Leidy 1851

= Stylemys =

Stylemys Temporal range: late Eocene to early Oligocene

Genus of turtles

Stylemys (meaning "pillar turtle") is the first fossil genus of dry land tortoise belonging to the order Testudines discovered in the United States. The genus lived in temperate to subtropical areas of North America, Europe, and Asia, based on fossil distribution. The genus was first described in 1851 by Joseph Leidy. The tortoise was common in the prehistoric Badlands, especially Nebraska and South Dakota. The species has also been found in the formations in and around Badlands National Park. Fossil fragments have also been found in the Palm Park Formation of New Mexico.

The ancient tortoises had primitive jaw muscles, unlike today's tortoises, which also display the os transiliens bone, and would have been herbivorous. While Stylemys species did exhibit the same neck structure as modern tortoises, the forelimbs were unsuitable for burrowing, setting them apart from modern genera.

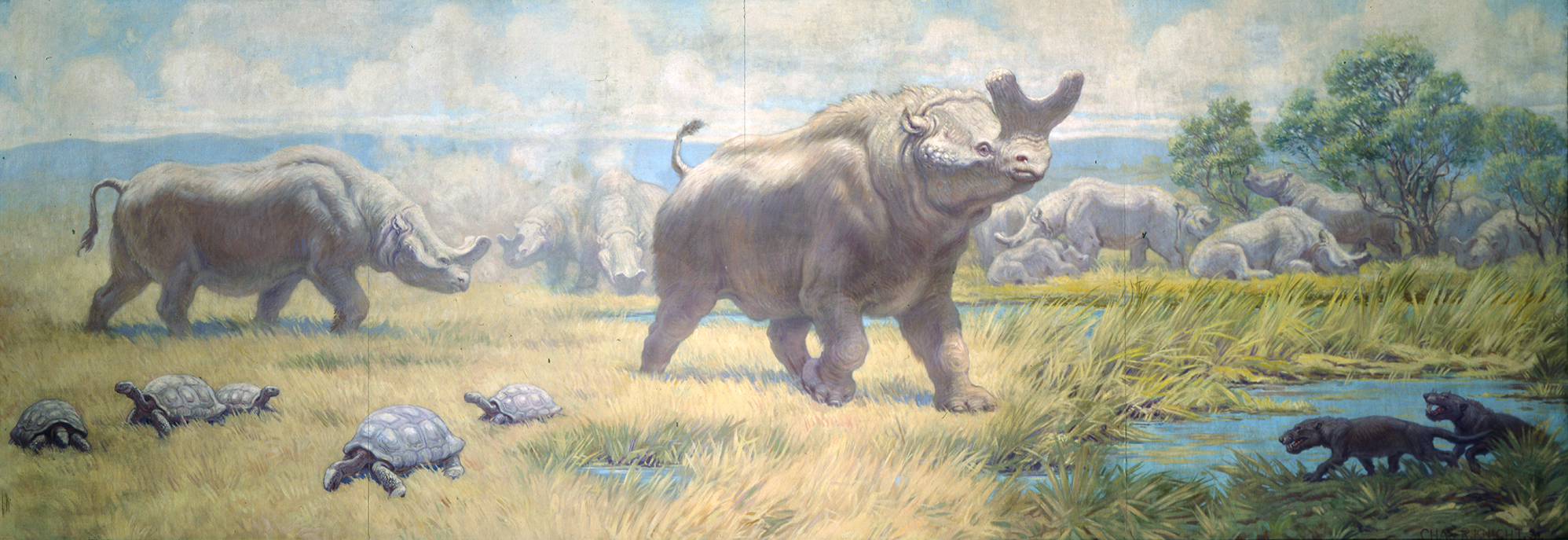
Depiction of Stylemys alongside Megacerops & Hyaenodon, by Charles R. Knight from 1931

== Species ==
A number of species have been described since the genus was named in 1851.

- S. botti
- S. calaverensis
- S. canetotiana
- S. capax
- S. conspecta
- S. copei
- S. emiliae
- S. frizaciana
- S. karakolensis
- S. nebrascensis (syn. S. amphithorax)
- S. neglectus
- S. oregonensis
- S. pygmea
- S. uintensis
- S. undabuna
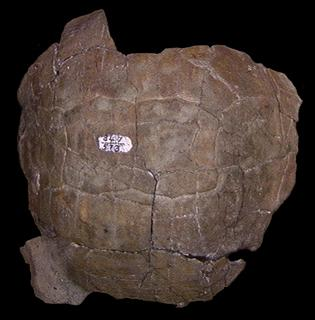
Stylemys conspecta from Tertiary in Oregon

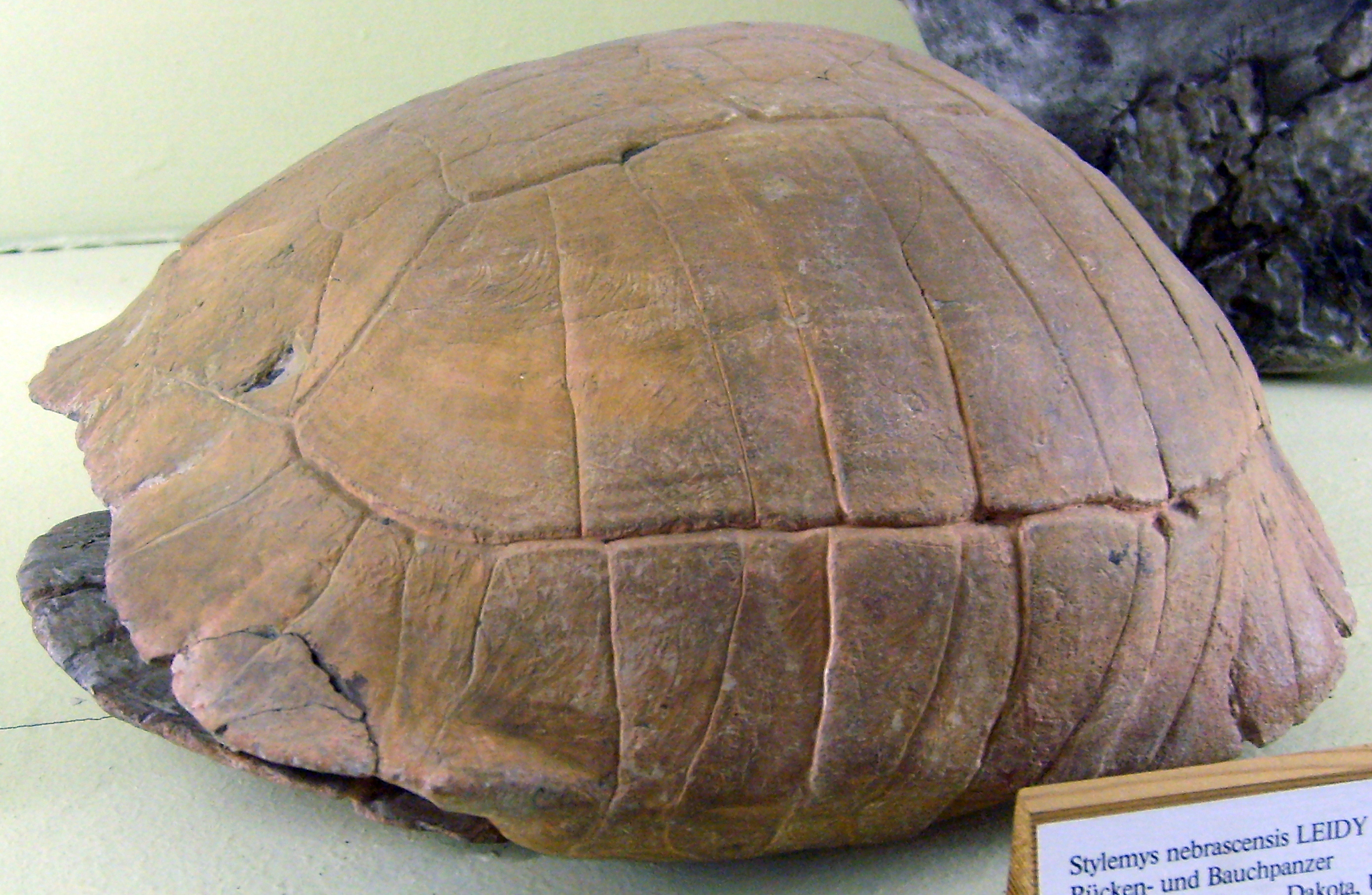
Stylemys nebrascensis shell at the Museum für Naturkunde, Berlin
