= Rincon Valley Formation =

Group of geologic formations in New Mexico, USA

- Stratigraphic range: Miocene
- Type: Formation
- Unit of: Santa Fe Group (geology)
- Underlies: Camp Rice Formation
- Overlies: Hayner Ranch Formation
- Thickness: 610 meters (2,000 ft)

Lithology
- Primary: Sandstone, mudstone, conglomerate
- Other: Gypsum

Location
- Coordinates: 32.588750°N 106.967225°W
- Region: New Mexico
- Country: United States

Type section
- Named for: Rincon Valley
- Named by: Seager et al.
- Year defined: 1971
- Rincon Valley Formation (the United States) Rincon Valley Formation (New Mexico)

The Rincon Valley Formation is a geologic formation found in the Rincon Valley of New Mexico. It preserves fossils dating back to the Miocene epoch and records a time when the valley was a closed basin, just before being integrated into the ancestral Rio Grande River.

== Description ==
The formation consists of pink to reddish-brown gypsiferous claystone and siltstone; conglomerate; and conglomeratic sandstone. The thickness is 610 meters (2,000 ft). The formation is exposed in the badlands bordering the Rio Grande valley north of Las Cruces, New Mexico. It grades below into the Hayner Ranch Formation and unconformably underlies the Camp Rice Formation. It is interbedded with flows of the Selden Basalt Member with a radiometric age of 9.6 million years.

The formation consists of two facies representing different depositional environments. The first is a fine-grained gypsiferous slope-forming facies interpreted as playa deposits in a closed basin. This contains gypsum beds up to 2 feet (0.61 m) thick. The second facies, which forms the upper 180 feet (55 m) of the formation, is a more resistant poorly sorted conglomerate interpreted as piedmont deposits, eroded from the uplifts that bordered the basin.

The formation is interpreted as the final filling of the closed basin. During its deposition, tectonic deformation continued along the Rio Grande rift, of which the basin was a part. Some 854 meters (2,802 ft) of displacement occurring along the Caballo Mountains border faults on the west side of the basin. The Sierra de las Uvas and Dona Ana Mountains to the south and southeast were first thrown during deposition of the formation, with a displacement of about 549 meters (1,801 ft) on the bounding fault of the Sierra de las Ulvas block.

Study of this and other Cenozoic formations in the region has helped provide evidence for four episodes of block faulting in the Rio Grande rift in the last 35 million years.

== Fossils ==
The formation is largely devoid of fossils. However, a single carpal bone of the rhinoceros Teleoceras fossiger has been recovered from the formation, of Hemphillian age, in agreement with the age of the formation from radiometric dating.

== History of investigation ==
The formation was first defined by W.R. Seager and coinvestigators in 1971, and assigned to the Santa Fe Group.
