= Indian Peak (Catron County, New Mexico) =

Landform in Catron County, New Mexico

- Location within New Mexico Location within the United States

Highest point
- Elevation: 10,102 ft (3,079 m)
- Prominence: 450 ft (140 m)
- Isolation: 0.98 mi (1.58 km) to Black Mountain
- Coordinates: 33°18′39″N 108°40′41″W

Geography
- Location: Catron County, New Mexico, United States
- Parent range: Mogollon Mountains
- Topo map: USGS Grouse Mountain

Geology
- Rock age(s): Miocene, between 23 and 5.3 Million years ago
- Rock type(s): Rhyolitic pyroclastic and volcaniclastic rocks
- Volcanic zone: Mogollon-Datil volcanic field, Bursum Caldera

Indian Peak is located in the Gila Wilderness in Catron County, New Mexico. Indian Peak is found in the Mogollon Mountains and is ranked the 203rd highest peak, and 1077th by prominence, for New Mexico.

Indian Peak is 9 miles (15 km) southeast of Mogollon, New Mexico and can be accessed via the Holt Apache Trial.
