= Doña Ana Mountains =

Mountain range in southern New Mexico

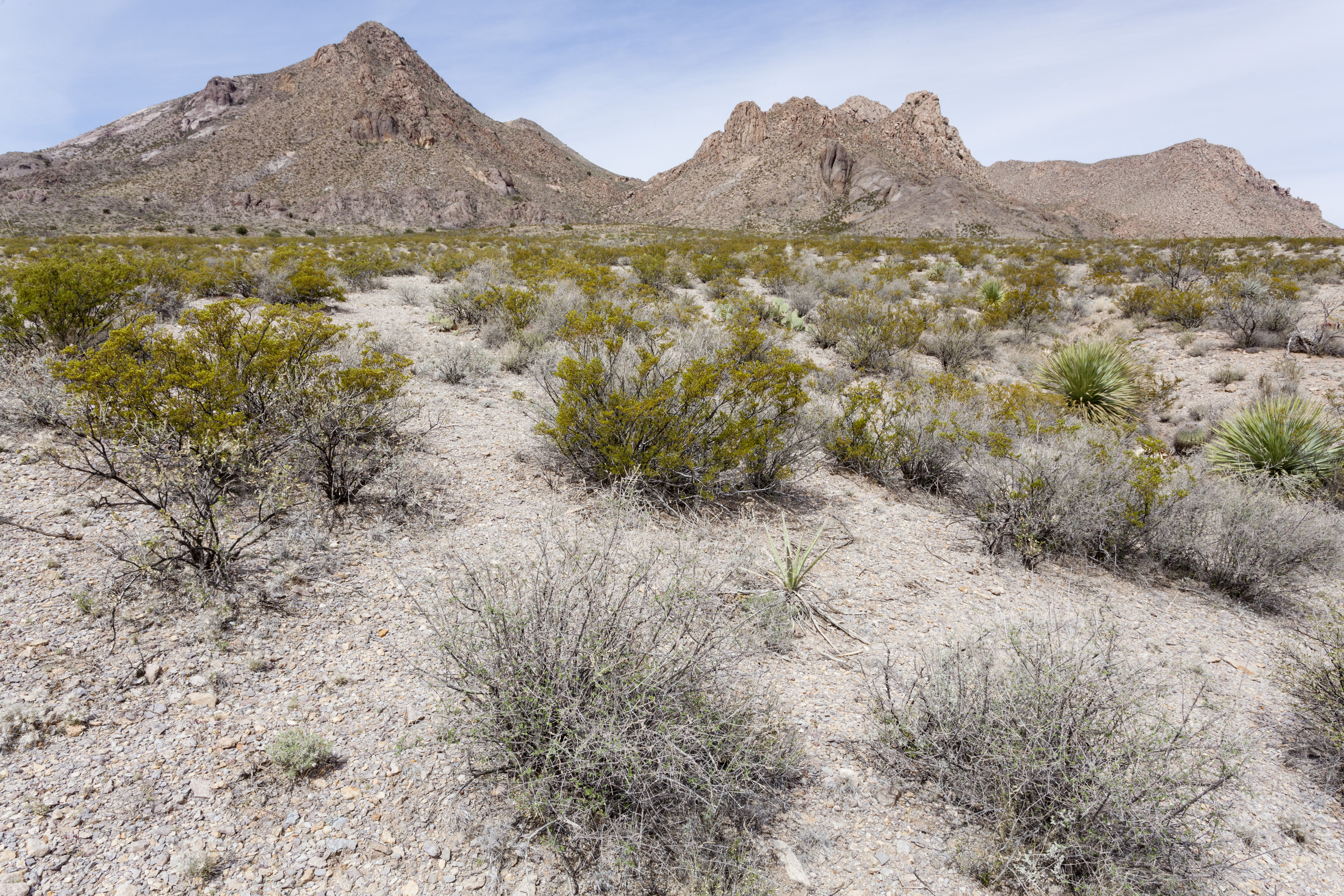
Southeastern base of the Doña Ana Mountains

The Doña Ana Mountains are a mountain range in Doña Ana County, New Mexico. The highest elevation in the range is Doña Ana Peak at 5,835 feet (1,779 meters), at 32°27′15″N 106°47′18″W.

== Description ==
The Doña Ana Mountains are a small, rugged mountain range in the desert a few kilometers north of the city of Las Cruces, New Mexico and just east of the Rio Grande. The range is bounded by escarpments to the east and south. Doña Ana Peak is located in the southeastern part of the range, where it is prominent viewed from Las Cruces, and Summerford Mountain is prominent in the northeast corner of the range. The range is heavily eroded and largely barren of vegetation, exposing some 130 square kilometers (50 sq mi) of bedrock.

== Geology ==
The mountains were formed in the late Tertiary as a fault block, which was uplifted on the east side along the Jornada fault and subsided to the west along the Robledo fault. This tilted the block by about 15 degrees towards the west. The northern part of the mountains is underlain by Pennsylvanian and Permian sedimentary rock, with a large syenite sill at Summerford Mountain. The middle section is Eocene lava flows and volcaniclastics (broken volcanic debris) of the Palm Park Formation, which were erupted about 43 million years ago. The southern part of the range exposes part of the Dona Ana caldera, which formed during the eruption of the Dona Ana Rhyolite about 36 million years ago. Beds of the Dona Ana Rhyolite ash flow tuff are up to 440 meters (1,440 ft) thick. The Summerford Mountain sill was intruded somewhat later, at around 33 million years ago.

== Mining ==
The mountains contain limited volcanic-epithermal vein deposits. These are minerals deposited in fractures by hot groundwater associated with the Dona Ana caldera. Limited mining of these deposits took place during the early 1900s, producing just $5000 in copper, silver, and gold. There is limited potential for lead-zinc, gold skarn, and carbonate-hosted replacement ores at depth below the surface. Marble has been quarried in small amounts for crushed stone from the mountains.
