= Bearwallow Mountain Andesite =

Geologic formation in New Mexico

- Stratigraphic range: Oligocene to Miocene, 27–23 Ma
- Type: Geologic formation
- Unit of: Mogollon Group
- Underlies: Gila Conglomerate
- Overlies: Bloodgood Canyon Tuff
- Thickness: 300 m (980 ft)

Lithology
- Primary: Andesite
- Other: Basaltic andesite, dacite

Location
- Coordinates: 33.449°N 108.669°W
- Region: New Mexico
- Country: United States

Type section
- Named for: Bearwallow Mountain (33.449°N 108.669°W)
- Named by: W.E. Elston
- Year defined: 1968
- Bearwallow Mountain Andesite (the United States) Bearwallow Mountain Andesite (New Mexico)

The Bearwallow Mountain Andesite or Bearwallow Mountain Formation is a geologic formation exposed in and around the Mogollon Mountains of southwest New Mexico. It has a radiometric age of 27 to 23 million years, corresponding to the late Oligocene to early Miocene epochs.

== Description ==
The Bearwallow Mountain Andesite is composed of calc-alkaline volcanic rock ranging from basaltic andesite to dacite, but predominantly andesite. These form a group of low cones or shield volcanoes and range in age from 27 to 23 million years old. Younger basalt flows and silica-rich dacites and rhyolites are excluded from the current definition of the unit.

The formation overlies the Bloodgood Canyon Tuff or eolian sandstones and is in turn overlain by the Gila Conglomerate. It is found throughout the Mogollon-Datil volcanic field as far southeast as the Black Range, and is included in the upper Mogollon Group.

The unit is interpreted as postcaldera volcanism of the Mogollon-Datil volcanic field along faults associated with Basin and Range Province extensional tectonics.

=== Members ===
The unit is locally separated into lower and upper informal members by interbedded tuffs, such as the rhyolite of Angel Roost.

== History of investigation ==
The unit was first defined as the Bearwallow Mountain Formation by W.E. Elston in 1968 as a thick sequence of volcanic flows found in the vicinity of Bearwallow Mountain in the Mogollon Mountains. In 1987, R.F. Marvin and coinvestigators restricted the definition to calc-alkaline andesites and basaltic andesites erupted as low cones or shield volcanoes.
