= City of Rocks State Park =

State park in New Mexico, United States

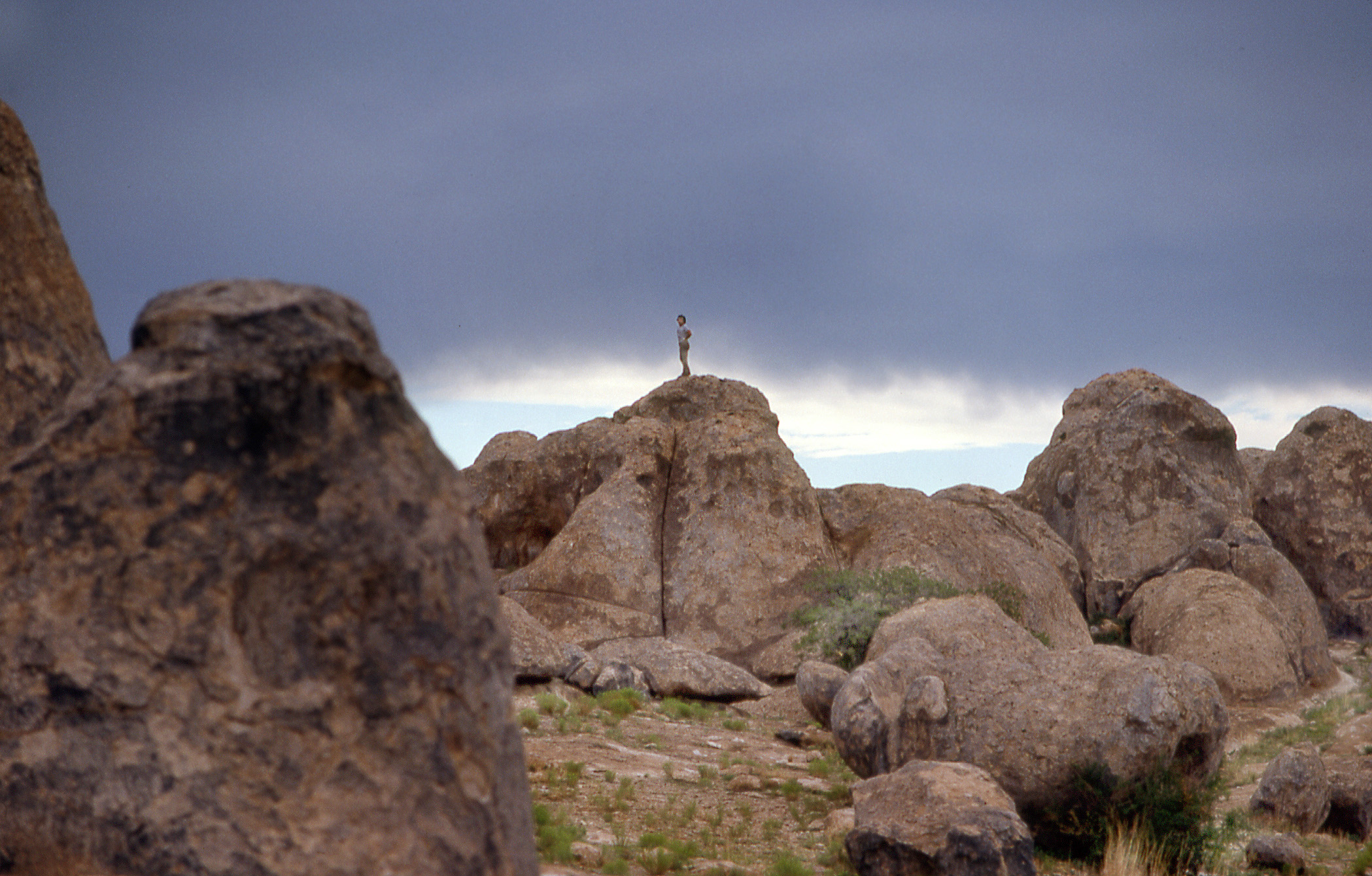
- City of Rocks State Park

- Location within New Mexico
- Location: Grant County, New Mexico, United States
- Coordinates: 32°35′17″N 107°58′26″W
- Area: 1,230 acres (500 ha)
- Elevation: 5,259 ft (1,603 m)
- Established: 1953
- Administrator: New Mexico State Parks Division
- Website: Official website

City of Rocks State Park is a state park in New Mexico, consisting of large sculptured rock formations in the shape of pinnacles or boulders rising as high as 40 feet (12 m).

== Geology ==
The bedrock forming City of Rocks was created 34.9 million years ago by a volcanic eruption. Then over millions of years, erosion sculpted the rock formations seen today. The eruption was from the Emory Caldera, centered near Hillsboro Peak at the southern end of the Black Range. The eruption was estimated to be a VEI 8 eruption, and it emplaced the Kneeling Nun Tuff, a tuff bed covering an area of 314-square-mile (810 km^{2}), which makes up the bedrock of the park. The rocks formed were shaped by the weathering of ash-flow tuff, through a combination of freeze-thaw cycles and plant growth. Water enters the crevices, expands when freezing, which widens the cracks. Plant growth in the cracks also contribute to the expansion of the cracks.

== History ==
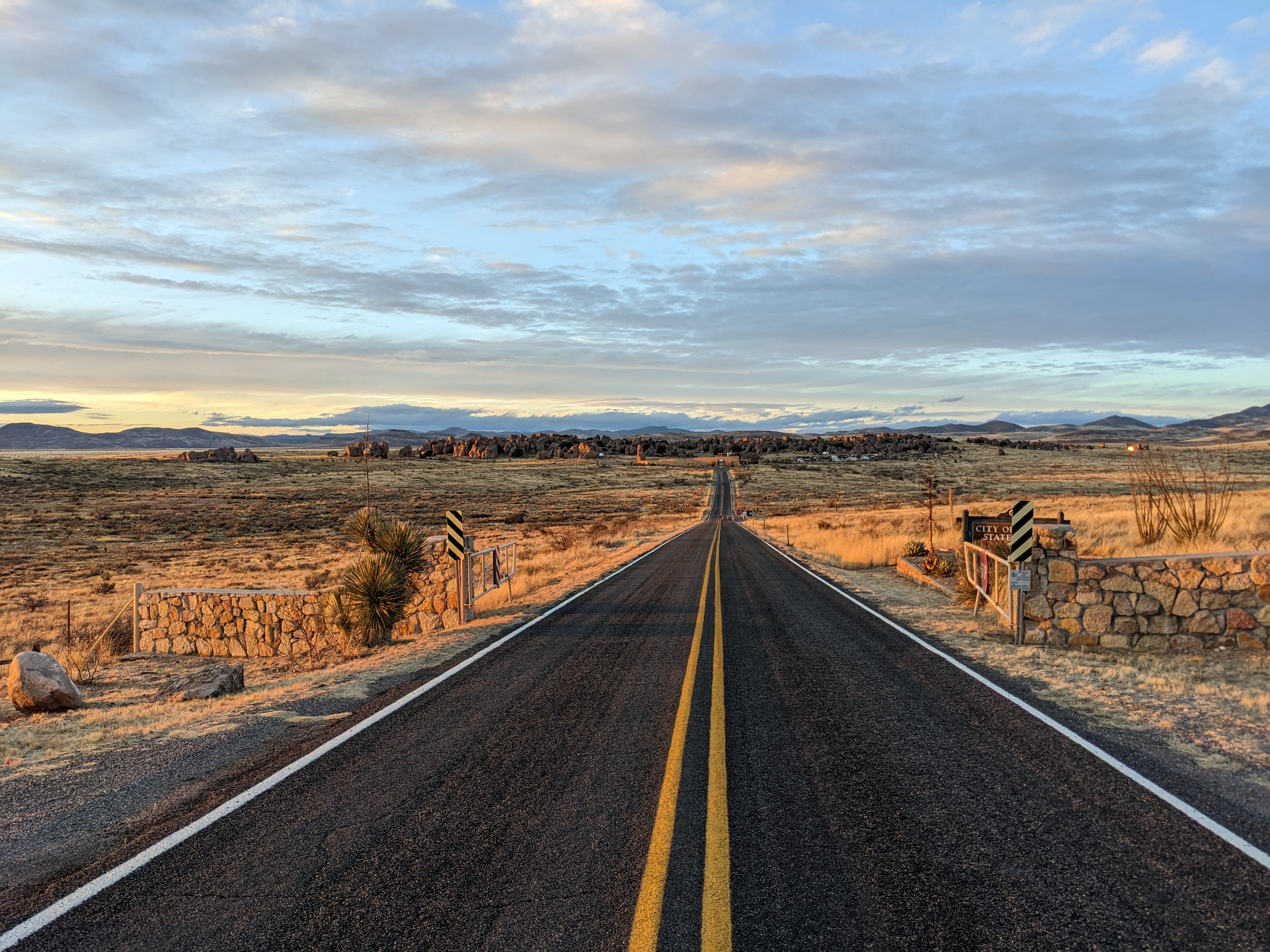
Looking N/NW towards the main entrance to City of Rocks State Park at sunset

The Mimbreno Indians settled in the area from 750 to 1250 AD. Pottery, arrowheads, and other artifacts show evidence of prehistoric Indians in the area. The pottery they left behind included images of people and animals, along with geometric patterns that exhibited such precision that it hints at the potential involvement of mechanical tools. Indian wells, or conical holes, are found in the rocks where water would be allowed to collect. The area also saw the presence of Spanish conquistadors who, during their time, carved crosses into the rocks.

In the 1800s city of rocks was also used as a landmark for the Butterfield Overland Mail Route, also known as the “Oxbow Route,'' because of the shape it traced on a map. Starting in St. Louis Missouri then carving through the southern states in efforts to avoid the rocky mountains, to end in San Francisco California.

Chapter 110 of the 1953 Laws of New Mexico created City of Rocks State Park on March 20, 1953. This legislation provided for the lease of 640 acres (2.6 km^{2}) of land from the Commissioner of Public Lands, New Mexico State Land Office for the purpose of a State Park and recreation area.

== Features ==
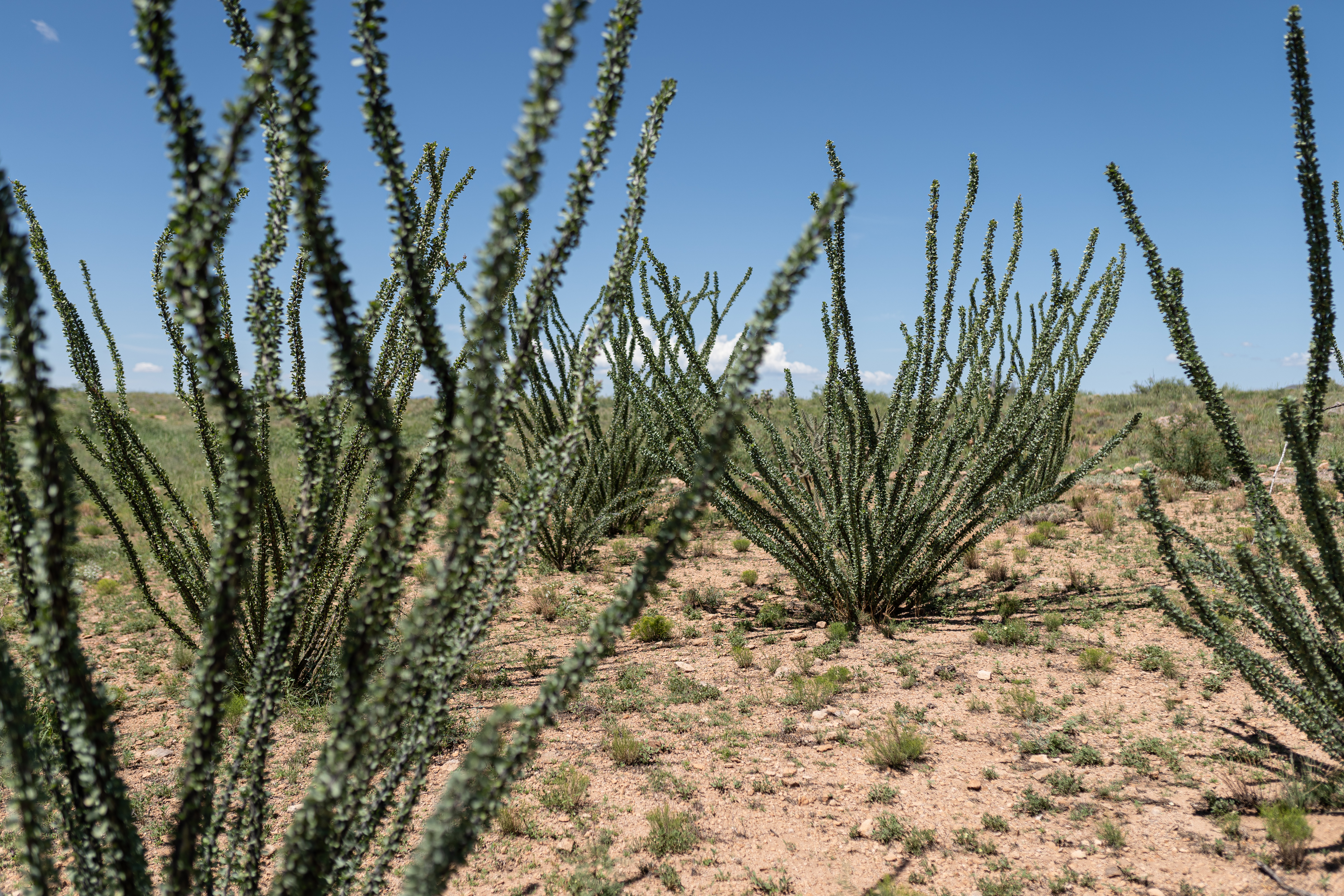
Ocotillo in the City of Rocks State Park's desert botanical garden

City of Rocks State Park provides opportunities for walks, hiking, camping, rock climbing, picnicking, wildlife viewing, and dark night-sky viewing (including a 14-inch (36 cm) telescope). Other features of the park include hiking trails, picnic areas and a desert botanical garden.

=== Wildlife ===
The park is home to a wide range of wildlife including many species of snakes, lizards, desert tortoise, and scorpion. Squirrels, chipmunks, mountain lions, coyotes, deer, and black bears can also be spotted here. Additionally there are at least 35 different bird species that can be found here including the New Mexico state bird, the Roadrunner.

The park also features a botanical garden housing cow's tongue, a type of succulent, bunny ear cacti, and Yuccas. The park itself is situated within the Chihuahuan Desert, whose land boasts diverse vegetation, including over 10 species of cacti. Notably, one of the more easily identifiable species is the rotund Fishhook Barrel Cactus, which stands out with its distinctive hooked spines and often showcases an array of yellow, egg-like fruits on its top.

=== Hiking trails ===
The City of Rocks State Park is also home to three main hiking trails: the Hydra trail, the Table Mountain trail, and the newly added Cienega Trail. The Hydra trail is 3.3 miles long with an elevation gain of 164 ft. The Table Mountain trail is 3 miles long with an elevation gain of 695 ft. The Cienega trail is about 2 miles, making it the shortest.

== Facilities ==
The park is open all year. The state park is about 29 miles away from nearby city Deming, and about 30 miles away from Silver City. Facilities include electrical and water hookups for camping, with restrooms and hot showers. At least 50,000 people visit the park annually.

Park map

One mile South from the park entrance is the visitors center. Inside the center there are murals of the wildlife and desert plants found in the state. And one of the otter walls there is a large mural; a result of the combined efforts of the local Youth Mural Program and the Western New Mexico University (WNMU) Outdoor Program. The entire mural was designed and painted by 23 kids in the Youth Mural Program. The mural is a depiction of the City of Rocks, it also showcases some of the native wildlife such as an owl and rattlesnake and the pristine night sky that the park is known for. The mural was finished with the handprints of the artists along the border.

The visitor center was constructed out of stone, as to blend in with its surroundings, and stands at around 20 feet tall. The center also provides books, maps, and other information for visitors. Additionally, the visitor center also sells camping supplies, and firewood, to accommodate the camping grounds.

City of Rocks State Park features the Gene and Elisabeth Simon Observatory, the first observatory constructed within a New Mexico state park. This facility was made possible through a donation from a nearby ranching couple, Gene and Elisabeth Simon, after whom it was named. This facility provides visitors with the opportunity to observe distant galaxies and celestial objects through telescopes or on video monitors after sunset.

A park map is displayed to the right including the trails and other man made features, such as restrooms and the visitor center.

== Recreational activities ==
The City of Rocks State Park has been designated as an International Dark Sky Park. Dark Sky Parks are distinctions awarded to parks that have demonstrated exceptional efforts in preserving and protecting dark skies. This recognition highlights the park's commitment to maintaining high-quality starry nights and offers opportunities to enhance visitor experiences. Additionally, achieving Dark Sky Park certification provides support from the National Park Service for expanding dark sky ranger programs and creates economic opportunities for neighboring communities through astronomy-based tourism, and increases the individuals experience while visiting. Though this certification does not carry any legal or regulatory authority, rather, it showcases the park's commitment to improving the quality of the night skies for its visitors.

== See also ==
- Faywood Hot Springs
