= Mogollon-Datil volcanic field =

Volcanic field in western New Mexico, United States

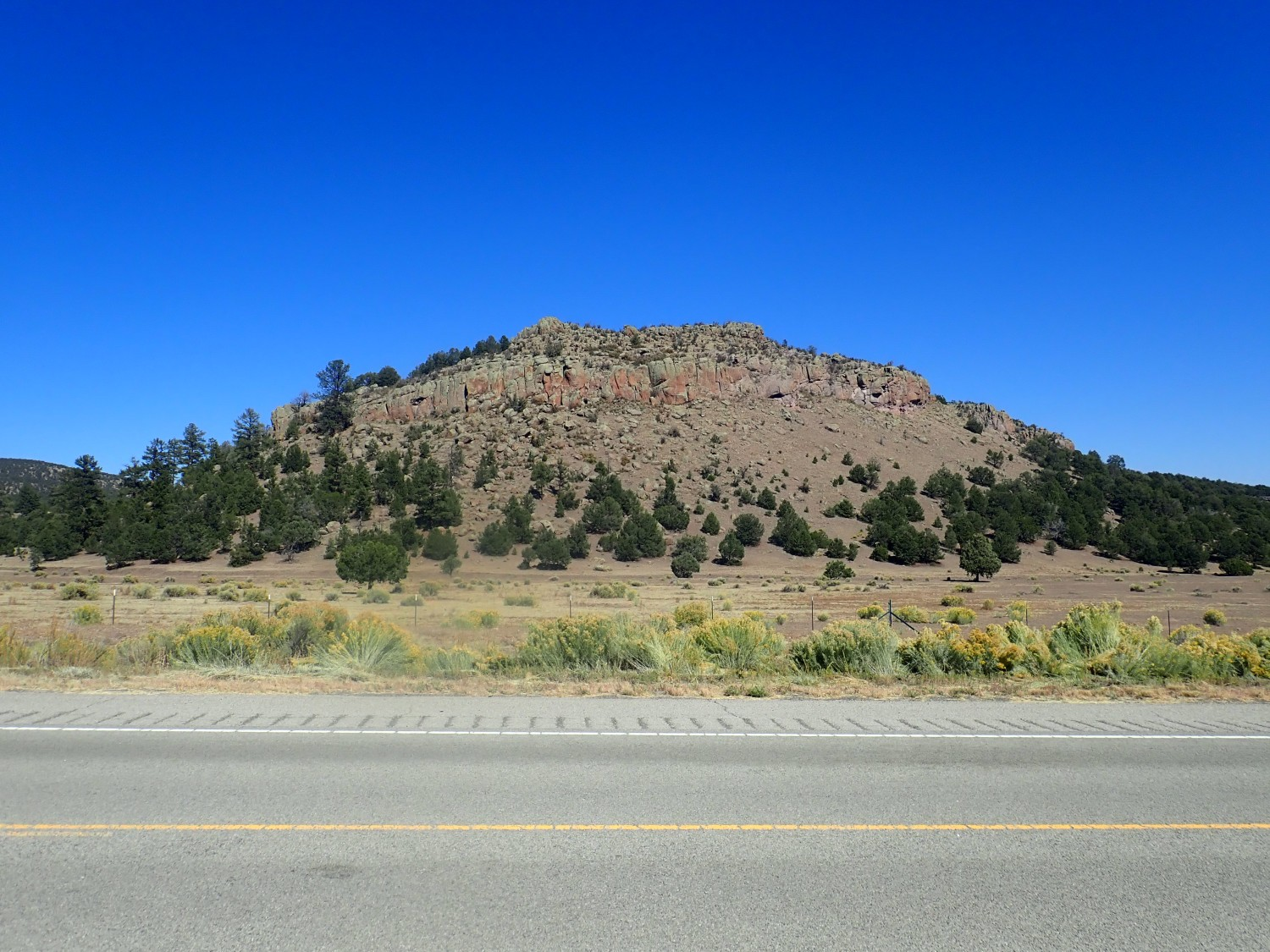
- Andesite-capped mesa in White House Canyon in the Mogollon-Datil volcanic field

Highest point
- Coordinates: 33°30′N 108°00′W

Geography
- Location: New Mexico, United States

Geology
- Rock age: Middle Tertiary
- Mountain type: Volcanic field

The Mogollon-Datil volcanic field is a large (40,000 square kilometers (15,000 sq mi)) silicic volcanic field in western New Mexico (Mogollon Mountains-Datil, New Mexico). It is a part of an extensive Eocene to Oligocene volcanic event which includes the San Juan volcanic field in southwestern Colorado, the Trans-Pecos volcanic field in west Texas and north central Mexico, the Boot Heel volcanic field in the bootheel of southwestern New Mexico and adjacent areas of Arizona and Mexico; and the vast volcanic field of the Sierra Madre Occidental of western Mexico. The Mogollon-Datil volcanic field was formed in "four discrete pulses representing synchronized activity of two separate cauldron complexes".

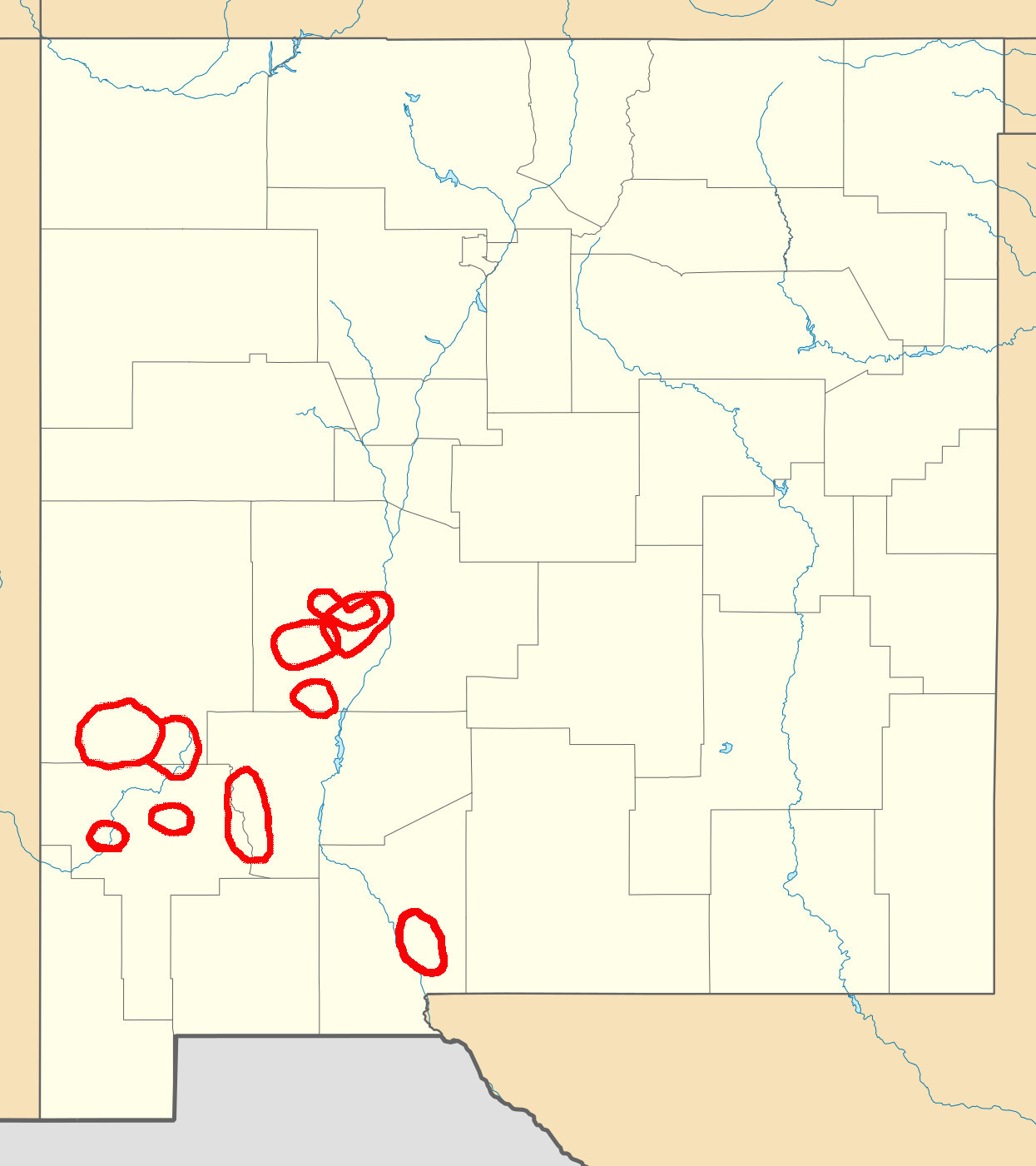
Calderas of Mogollon-Datil volcanic field

== Geologic history ==
The volcanic activity of the Mogollon-Datil began near present-day Las Cruces, New Mexico about 36.2 million years ago (mya) with the eruption of the Cueva Tuff from the Organ Caldera. Activity spread to the northwest to the Mogollon caldera by 34.0 mya, and this first pulse of activity died down around 33.5 mya. A second short pulse of activity occurred between 32.1 and 31.4 mya, with activity both in the existing southern part of the field and at a new caldera complex centered west of Socorro, New Mexico. The third and most extensive pulse of activity lasted from 29.0 to 27.4 mya. A fourth small pulse occurred from 26.1 to 24.3 mya.

The caldera eruptions produced enormous volumes of tuffs across the region. The first two pulses of activity produced a total volume of 3,000 cubic kilometers (720 cu mi) of tuffs, while the third pulse produced over 6,000 cubic kilometers (1,400 cu mi) of tuffs.

The silica-rich caldera eruptions were accompanied by eruptions of less silica-rich (mafic to intermediate) volcanic rock. These were mostly andesite during the first eruptive pulse, becoming less silica-rich (mostly basaltic andesite) in later eruptive pulses. The third eruptive pulse was also accompanied by less explosive rhyolite eruptions of the Taylor Creek Rhyolite, which may have come from a single magma chamber less enriched in volatiles.

The initial mafic to intermediate volcanism has chemical signatures typical of calc-alkaline volcanic rock of volcanic arcs. The later eruptions have been attributed to a "mini-plume" produced by the disintegration of the Farallon plate.

== Formations ==
The stratigraphic framework for the Mogollon-Datil volcanic field has undergone many revisions. The Datil Formation was originally defined by Winchester in 1920 to include all the extrusive units from the field. The Datil Formation was later promoted to group rank with the addition of some related sedimentary formations, such as the Baca Formation and the Spears Formation. The base of the group, as originally defined, rests unconformably on the Mesaverde Formation, and the series is succeeded by the Popotosa Formation of the Santa Fe Group.

The stratigraphic framework proposed by Cather, Chamberlin, and Ratte in 1994 divides the units associated with the Mogollon-Datil volcanic field into three groups and removes the Baca Formation:

| Volcanic Units | | Sedimentary Units | |
|---|---|---|---|
| Mogollon Group | tuff of Turkey Springs (24.3 Ma); Bearwallow Mountain Andesite (27 to 23 Ma); Uvas Basaltic Andesite; La Jara Peak Basaltic Andesite; South Canyon Tuff (27.4 Ma); Lemitar Tuff (28.0 Ma); Apache Springs Tuff (28.0 Ma); Bloodgood Canyon Tuff (28.0 Ma); Squirrel Springs Andesite; Shelley Peak Tuff (28.1 Ma); Vicks Peak Tuff (28.4 Ma); La Jencia Tuff (28.7 Ma); Davis Canyon Tuff (29.0 Ma); Sawmill Canyon Formation; Luis Lopez Formation basaltic andesite of Poverty Creek | Spears Group | South Crosby Peak Formation; Rincon Windmill Formation; Chavez Canyon Formation; Dog Springs Formation; Rubio Peak Formation; Palm Park Formation; Pueblo Creek Formation; Bell Top Formation; Rock Springs Formation; Red Rock Ranch Formation; Piloncillo Sediments unit of East Red Canyon sandstone of Monument Park sandstone of Escondido Mountain volcaniclastic unit of Canon del Leon volcaniclastic unit of Largo Creek |
| lacuna (31.4-29.0 Ma) | | Spears Group | South Crosby Peak Formation; Rincon Windmill Formation; Chavez Canyon Formation; Dog Springs Formation; Rubio Peak Formation; Palm Park Formation; Pueblo Creek Formation; Bell Top Formation; Rock Springs Formation; Red Rock Ranch Formation; Piloncillo Sediments unit of East Red Canyon sandstone of Monument Park sandstone of Escondido Mountain volcaniclastic unit of Canon del Leon volcaniclastic unit of Largo Creek |
| Datil Group | Tadpole Ridge Tuff (31.4 Ma); Caballo Blanco Tuff; Hells Mesa Tuff (32.0 Ma); Box Canyon Tuff (33.5 Ma); Blue Canyon Tuff (33.7 Ma); Cooney Tuff (34.0 Ma) andesite of Dray Leggett Canyon; Rock House Canyon Tuff (34.2 Ma) tuff of Bishop Peak (34.8 Ma); Kneeling Nun Tuff (34.9 Ma); Bell Top Formation (#3: 35.0 Ma); Sugarlump Tuff tuff of Farr Ranch; Datil Well Tuff (35.0 Ma) andesite of White House Canyon; Dona Ana Tuff; Squaw Mountain Tuff (35.8 Ma); Achenbach Park Tuff (35.8 Ma); Cueva Tuff (36.2 Ma) | Spears Group | South Crosby Peak Formation; Rincon Windmill Formation; Chavez Canyon Formation; Dog Springs Formation; Rubio Peak Formation; Palm Park Formation; Pueblo Creek Formation; Bell Top Formation; Rock Springs Formation; Red Rock Ranch Formation; Piloncillo Sediments unit of East Red Canyon sandstone of Monument Park sandstone of Escondido Mountain volcaniclastic unit of Canon del Leon volcaniclastic unit of Largo Creek |

Cather, Chamberlin, and Ratte find that the Alum Mountain Formation in the southern part of the field may span the lacuna between the Mogollon and Datil Groups, though they suggest a tentative assignment to the Mogollon Group. Still further south, voluminous volcanic activity in northern Chihuahua took place in this time period and no lacuna exists.

Clasts of the Vicks Peak and La Jencia Tuffs have been found in the gravel beds of the Benavidez Member of the Cerro Conejo Formation in the Rio Puerco valley west of Albuquerque. These suggest that the outflow sheets of the Datil-Mogollon volcanic field reached as far north as the northern edge of the younger Mount Taylor volcanic field, where they interfingered with the Chuska Sandstone and with cherty gravels eroded off the Zuni Mountains. This outflow sheet was subsequently completely eroded away north of the Rio Salado.

== Notable calderas ==
=== Northern complex ===
Socorro-Magdalena caldera cluster

Location: West of Socorro, South of Magdalena, and Southeast of Datil.

| Name | Associated tuff | Coordinates | Age |
|---|---|---|---|
| Bear Trap Caldera | tuff of Turkey Springs | 33°45′N 107°36′W | 24.3 Ma |
| Mount Withington Caldera | South Canyon Tuff | 33°48′N 107°30′W | 27.4 Ma |
| Hardy Ridge Caldera | Lemitar Tuff | 33°54′N 107°18′W | 28 Ma |
| Sawmill Canyon Caldera | La Jencia Tuff | 34°00′N 107°18′W | 28.7 Ma |
| Socorro Caldera | Hells Mesa Tuff | 34°00′N 107°06′W | 32 Ma |

=== Southern complex ===
Located from Las Cruces to Mogollon:

| Name | Associated tuff | Coordinates | Age |
|---|---|---|---|
| Bursum Caldera | Bloodgood Canyon Tuff | 33°30′N 108°30′W | 28.0 Ma |
| Gila Cliff Dwellings Caldera | Shelley Peak Tuff; Davis Canyon Tuff | 33°30′N 108°15′W | 28.1 Ma; 29.0 Ma |
| Nogal Caldera | Vicks Peak Tuff | 33°36′N 107°24′W | 28.4 Ma |
| Twin Sisters Caldera | Tadpole Ridge Tuff; Caballo Blanco Tuff | 33°00′N 108°15′W | 31.4 Ma; 31.7 Ma |
| Schoolhouse Mountain Caldera | Box Canyon Tuff | 32°45′N 108°36′W | 33.5 Ma |
| Mogollon Caldera (just one fragment in the Bursum Caldera wall) | Cooney Tuff; Fanney Rhyolite; Apache Springs Tuff | 33°30′N 108°30′W | 34.0 Ma |
| Emory Caldera | Kneeling Nun Tuff; Fall Canyon Tuff | 33°00′N 107°45′W | 34.9 Ma |
| Organ Caldera | Squaw Mountain Tuff; Achenback Park Tuff; Cueva Tuff | 32°30′N 106°45′W | 35.8 Ma; 35.8 Ma; 36.2 Ma |

== See also ==
- List of volcanoes in the United States
- List of volcanic fields
- Datil-Mogollon Section
