= Palm Park Formation =

Geologic formation in New Mexico

- Stratigraphic range: Eocene; 45.0–39.6 Ma
- Type: Formation
- Unit of: Spears Group
- Underlies: Bell Top Formation, Rincon Valley Formation, Santa Fe Group
- Overlies: Love Ranch Formation
- Thickness: 2,000 feet (610 m)

Lithology
- Primary: Conglomerate
- Other: Siltstone

Location
- Coordinates: 32.7570203°N 107.144351°W
- Region: New Mexico
- Country: United States

Type section
- Named for: Palm Park
- Named by: Kelley and Silver
- Year defined: 1952
- Palm Park Formation (the United States) Palm Park Formation (New Mexico)

The Palm Park Formation is a geologic formation in southern New Mexico. It preserves fossils dating back to the Eocene epoch.

== Description ==
The formation consists of reddish clastic sediments, including some beds of boulder conglomerate with individual boulders up to 12 feet (3.7 m) in diameter. The red color is attributed to a source in the Abo Formation. The upper beds contains considerable latite to andesite breccia interbedded with tuffaceous claystone and siltstone. The Palm Park Formation rests gradationally on the Love Ranch Formation, is unconformably overlain by the Bell Top Formation, Rincon Valley Formation, or Santa Fe Group, and has a thickness of about 2,000 feet (610 m).

The original age estimate, based on radiometric ages of intrusions and interbedded flows, ranged from 42 to 51 million years. More recent high-precision U-Pb dating gives an age of 45.0±0.7 Ma for an ash fall tuff in the lower part of the formation in the Robledo Mountains and an age of 39.6±0.5 Ma for an ash fall tuff in the upper part of the formation in the Sierra de las Uvas. The interbedded ash fall tuffs and volcaniclastic beds of the formation are interpreted as volcanic activity after the end of Laramide mountain building but before the opening of the Rio Grande Rift. At this time, the remnants of the Farallon Plate began to sink into the deep mantle and hot mantle rock rose to take their place, triggering the Mid-Tertiary ignimbrite flare-up.

== Fossils ==
The Palm Park Formation contains hot-water stromatolites. Stable oxygen isotope measurements show that the fine layers (laminae) making up the stromatolites were deposited seasonally, with the sparry (coarsely crystalline) layers deposited in the spring and summer, and the micritic (fine-grained) layers deposited in the fall and winter. This suggests that laminae in more ancient stromatolites are also seasonal in nature.

The formation also contains Eocene fossil vertebrates of Chadronian age. These are found in deeply weathered volcaniclastic beds of the middle and upper part of the formation that are interbedded with plant- and gastropod-bearing travertines, and most are also badly weathered. However, they include shell fragments of the tortoise Stylemys, jaw fragments of Hyaenodon horriblis, tooth fragments likely of Hyracodon, and a partial skeleton of a protoceratid.

== Economic geology ==
Barite-galena-manganese deposits are present in the Palm Park Formation in the Rincon basin. These had produced 10,520 tons of barite and 1529 tons of 27%-40% manganese ore by 1998. The formation also contains gypsum and travertine, but not in economic amounts for the 1998 market.

== History of investigation ==
The formation was first named by V.C. Kelley and Caswell Silver in 1952 for exposures in Palm Park, southeast of Caballo. Because no complete section exists, a type locality was designated instead of a type section. Steven M. Cather and his coinvestigators assigned the Palm Park Formation to the Spears Group in 1994.

== See also ==
- List of fossiliferous stratigraphic units in New Mexico
- Paleontology in New Mexico
