= Rubio Peak Formation =

Geologic formation in New Mexico, USA

- Stratigraphic range: Eocene
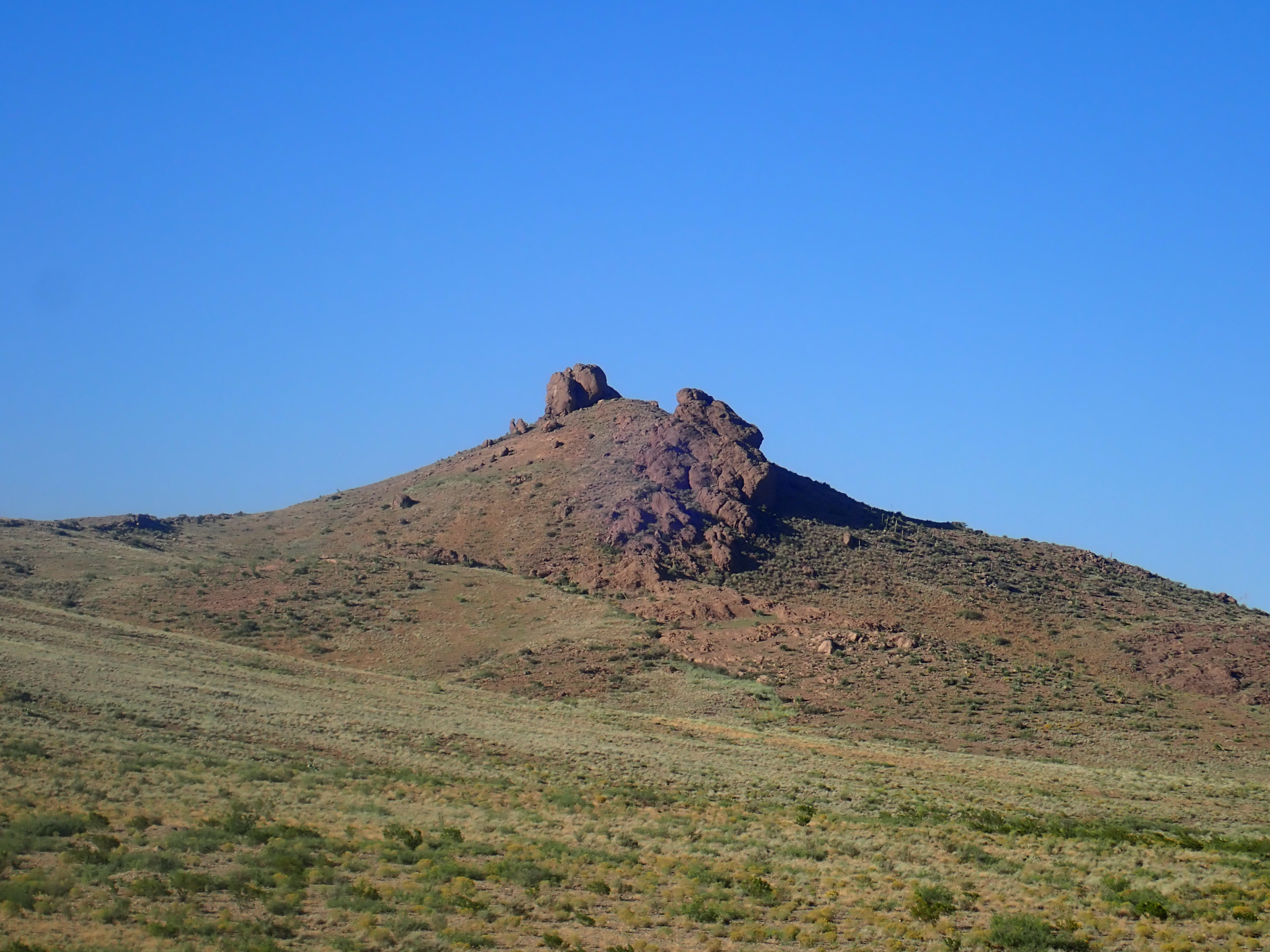
- Monument Peak, located near Lake Valley, New Mexico, USA, is underlain by Rubio Peak Formation.
- Type: Formation
- Unit of: Spears Group
- Underlies: Sugarlump Tuff
- Overlies: early Tertiary plutons
- Thickness: 5,000 feet (1,500 m)

Location
- Coordinates: 32.6899504°N 107.8944869°W
- Region: New Mexico
- Country: United States

Type section
- Named by: W.E. Elston
- Year defined: 1953
- Rubio Peak Formation (the United States) Rubio Peak Formation (New Mexico)

The Rubio Peak Formation is a geologic formation located in southwestern New Mexico. It is thought to have been deposited in the Eocene Epoch.

== Description ==
The formation is volcanic, consisting mostly of flows of amphibole latites to pyroxene andesites and associated volcaniclastics and tuffs. The flows have a silica content of 59-63%. The appearance is highly variable, from pinkish gray to red to brown to black, with large to small phenocrysts and with glassy to fully crystalline texture. However, the chemical composition is reasonably uniform across the formation. The maximum thickness is as much as 5,000 feet (1,500 m). It lies on older Tertiary intrusive rocks and is overlain and interfingers with the Sugarlump Tuff.

Oxygen isotope ratios suggest that the magma from which the formation solidified had its origin in the Earth's mantle and underwent a degree of fractional crystallization.

The formation has not been directly dated. However, the overlying Sugarlump Tuff has been radiometrically dated as 35.17±0.12 million years old, so the Rubio Peak Formation cannot be younger than this nor older than the Tertiary rocks on which it was deposited. This suggests an Eocene age for the formation.

== Fossils ==
The formation contains Duchesnean and early Chadronian mammal fossils. These included a jaw of the brontothere Duchesneodus.

== History of investigation ==
The formation first appears informally in a chart prepared by R.M. Hernon and coinvestigators in 1953, but was apparently first used in an unpublished paper by W.E. Elston that same year. C.H. Dane and G.O. Bachman (1961) mapped the formation throughout southwestern New Mexico and extended the definition to include some flows that appeared to be of Cretaceous age, but subsequent work has restricted the definition to flows near the type area and of Eocene to Olicocene age. The formation was assigned to the Spears Group by Steven M. Cather and coinvestigators in 1994, who excluded the volcanic units and restricted the formation to the associated volcaniclastics.
