= Volcaniclastics =

Geologic materials composed of broken fragments of volcanic rock

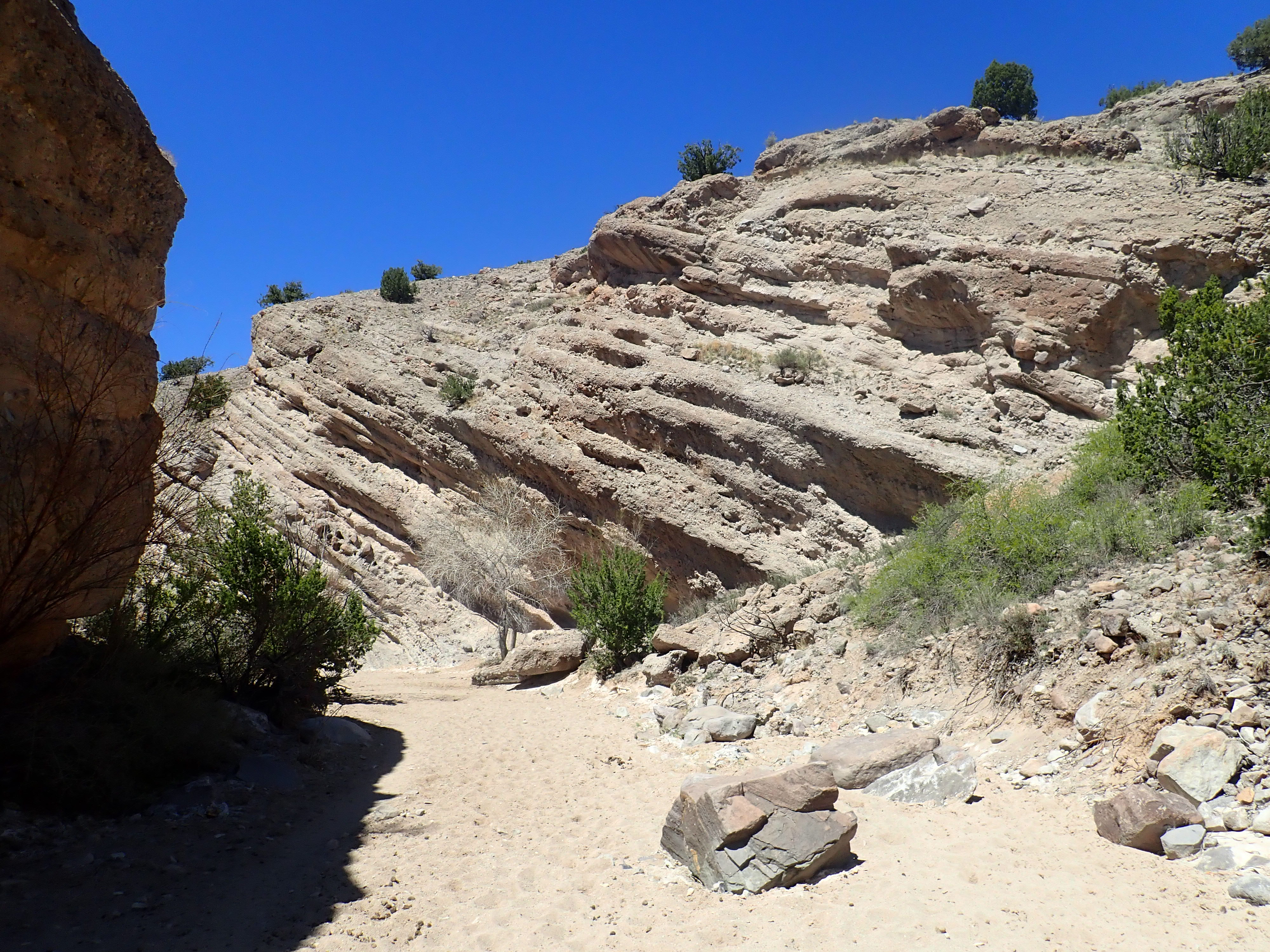
The Espinaso Formation includes a wide variety of volcaniclastic materials.

Volcaniclastics are geologic materials composed of broken fragments (clasts) of volcanic rock. These encompass all clastic volcanic materials, regardless of what process fragmented the rock, how it was subsequently transported, what environment it was deposited in, or whether nonvolcanic material is mingled with the volcanic clasts. The United States Geological Survey defines volcaniclastics somewhat more narrowly, to include only rock composed of volcanic rock fragments that have been transported some distance from their place of origin.

In the broad sense of the term, volcaniclastics includes pyroclastic rocks such as the Bandelier Tuff; cinder cones and other tephra deposits; the basal and capping breccia that characterize ʻaʻā lava flows; and lahars and debris flows of volcanic origin.

Volcaniclastics make up more of the volume of many volcanoes than do lava flows. Volcaniclastics may have contributed as much as a third of all sedimentation in the geologic record.

== Classification of volcaniclastics ==
Volcaniclastics are composed of a range of pyroclastic detritus mixed with epiclastic sediments and formed in variable depositional environments. Volcaniclastics include pyroclastic rock and tephra; volcanic autoclastic, alloclastic, and epiclastic materials; and fault gouge where faults displace volcanic rock. All are defined below. These can be divided into primary volcaniclastics and secondary volcaniclastics (epivolcaniclastics).

Primary versus secondary volcaniclastic rocks
Primary volcaniclastic deposits (Characteristic clasts must be more than 75% of volume)	Secondary volcanic deposits (epivolcaniclastic deposits)
Pyroclastic tuff or tephra (Pyroclastic deposit); Autoclastic rock or loose deposit Hyaloclastic rock or loose deposit (Hyaloclastite); Redeposited pyroclastic tephra Redeposited autoclastic loose deposit Redeposited hyaloclastic loose deposit	Epiclastic deposits have more than 75% epiclasts in the general case. They are epivolcanicastic deposits if they have recognizable volcanic fragments in any proportion.

=== Pyroclastic ===
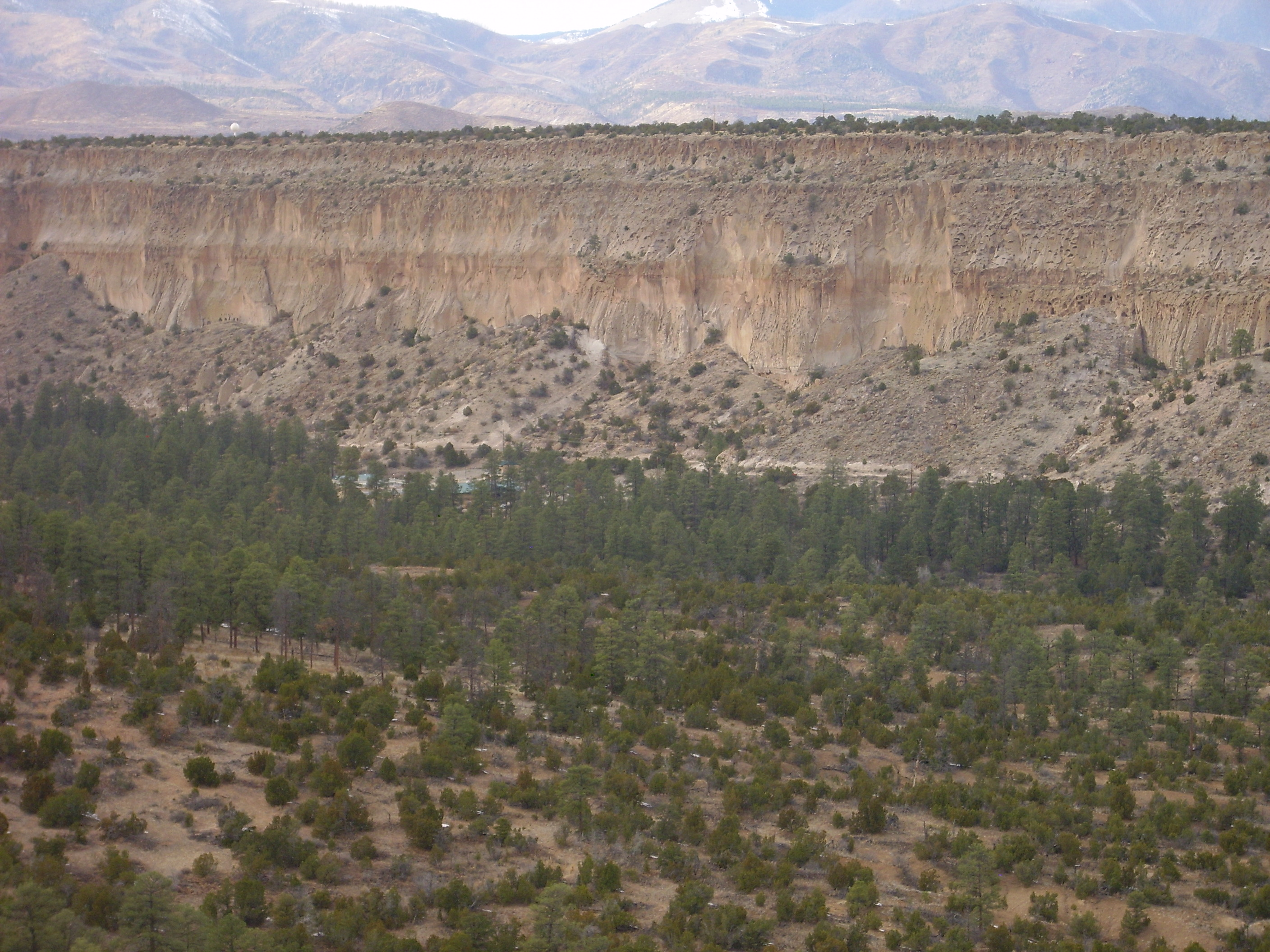
The Bandelier Tuff is an example of a pyroclastic rock formation.

Pyroclastic material is composed of rock fragments produced by explosive volcanism and erupted from the vent as individual particles, without reference to the particle origin or the nature of the eruption. These may include particles of country rock entrained within the vent. Accumulations of pyroclastic material that have not been consolidated are described as tephra, while those that have undergone significant consolidation are described as pyroclastic rock. Hydroclastic material is a special case of pyroclastic material produced by a variety of processes at magma-water interfaces.

=== Autoclastic ===
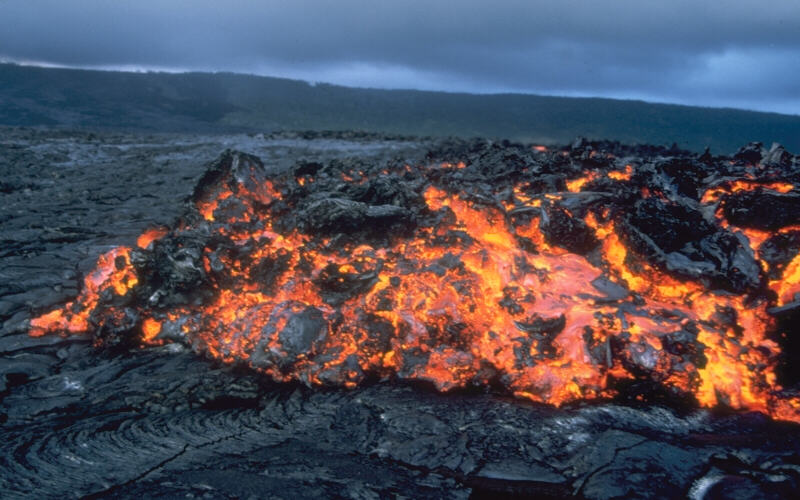
'A'a lava flow with capping breccia at Kīlauea volcano

Autoclastic volcanic material is produced by processes active during movement of solid or semisolid lava. These include rock fragments that are produced within volcanic vents but not extruded, rock fragments produced by motion or gas explosions within volcanic flows, or rock fragments produced by gravitational collapse of lava domes or spines. The characteristic basal and capping breccia of ʻaʻā lava flows are autoclastic volcaniclastics.

=== Other kinds of volcaniclastic material ===
Alloclastic volcanic material is formed by fragmentation of existing igneous rock by subsurface igneous activity that may or may not involve magma intrusions. Fault gouge produced by motion along a fault in volcanic rock is also a type of volcaniclastic material.

=== Epivolcaniclastics ===
Volcanic epiclastic material (epivolcaniclastics) contains a substantial fraction of epiclasts (rock fragments produced by weathering and erosion) derived from volcanic rock.

=== Mixed pyroclastic-epiclastic rocks ===
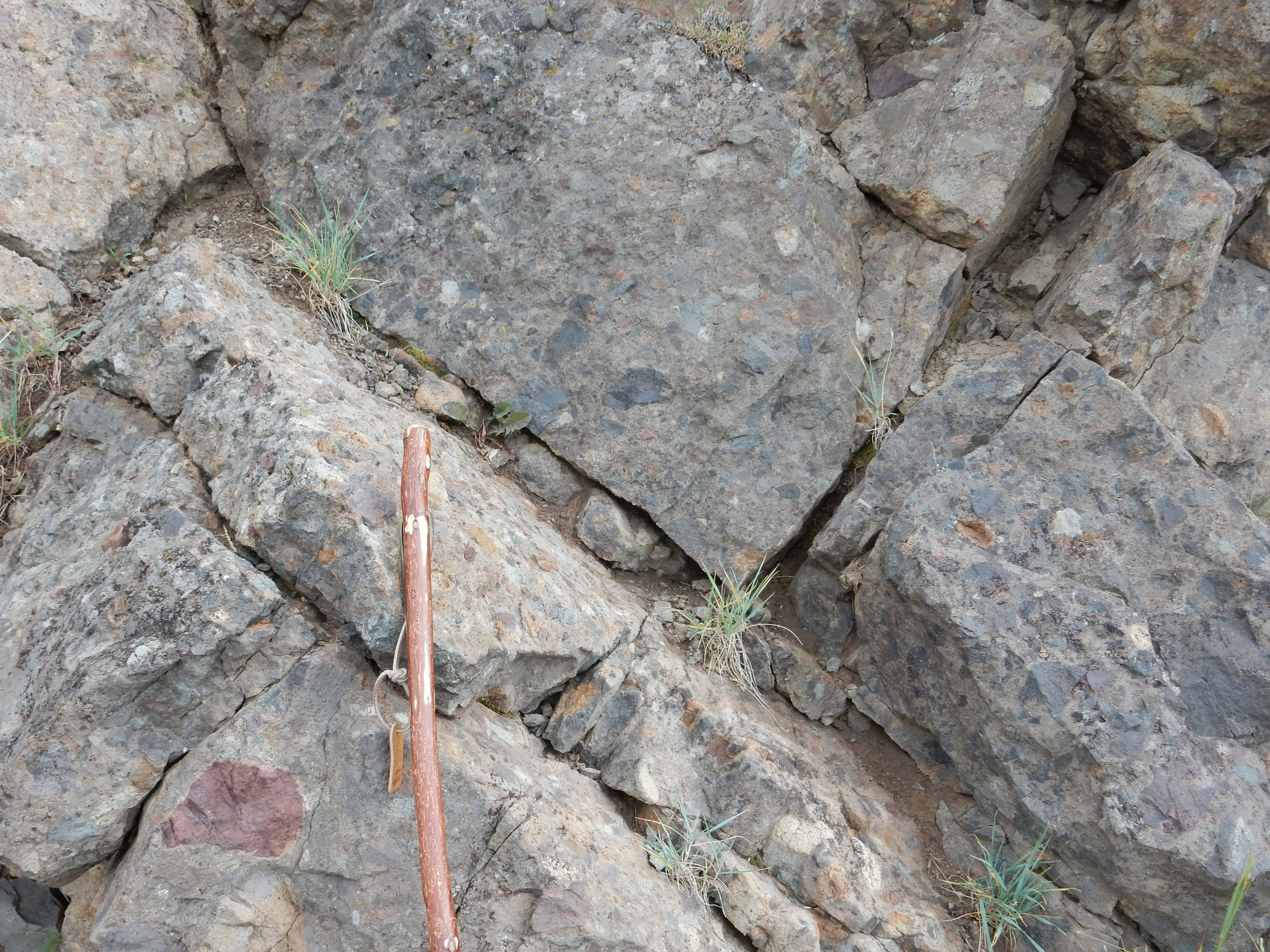
The Washburn Group of Yellowstone National Park includes volcaniclastic conglomerate.

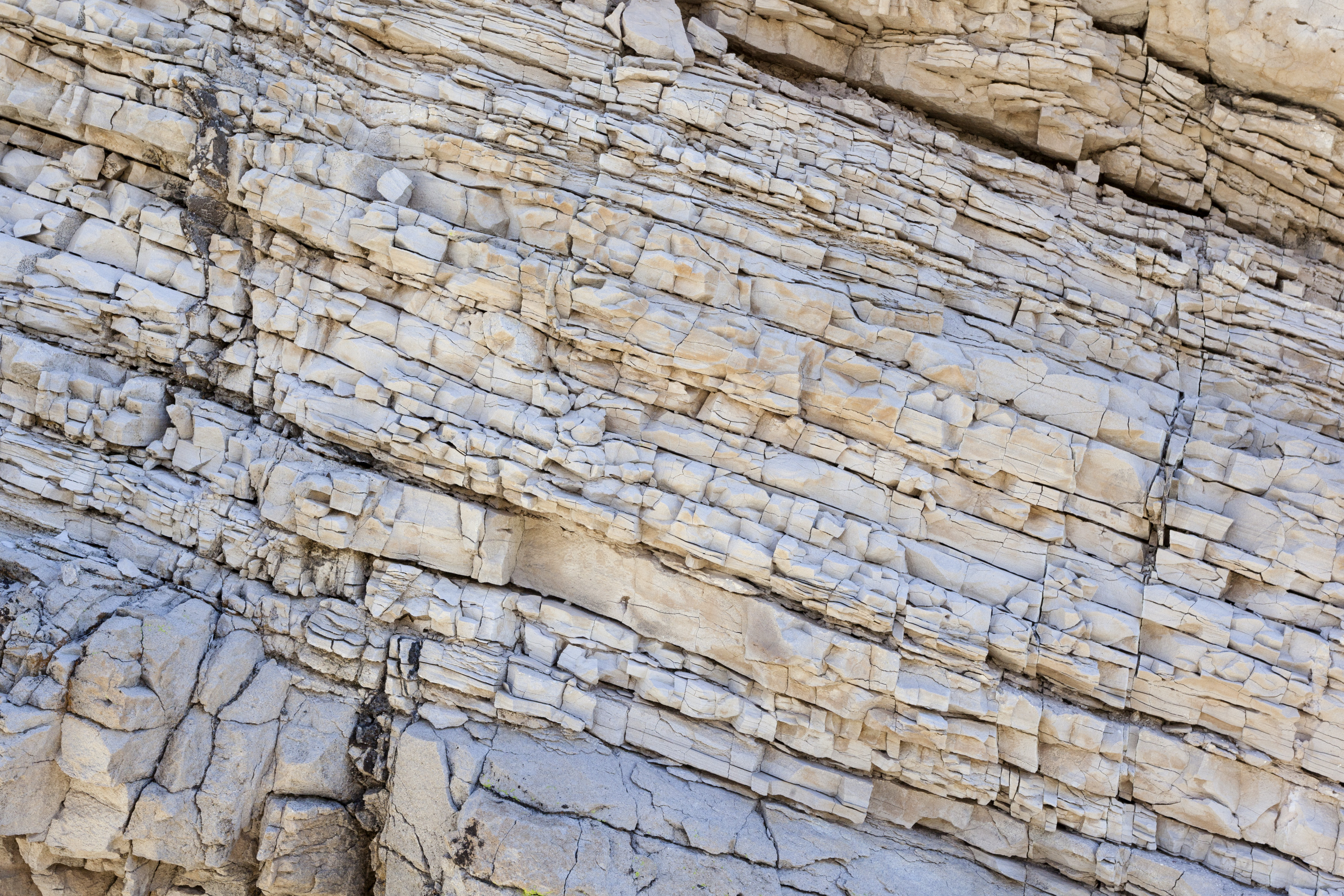
Tuffaceous sandstone layers in New Mexico

Deposits containing pyroclastic material that has been reworked in stream or lake environments or mingled with epiclastic material (whether volcanic or nonvolcanic) pose a special difficulty and are among the materials most usefully described simply as volcaniclastic. A more specific classification is problematic for these cases. The Espinaso Formation of New Mexico is an example of a rock unit that is composed of a complex mixture of pyroclastic and volcanic epiclastic material and so is described simply as volcaniclastic. Another is the Washburn Group of the Yellowstone area, which includes debris flows of reworked volcanic ash and volcanic epiclastic rock.

Mixed pyroclastic-epiclastic deposits may be classified by average clast size and percentage of pyroclastic material.

Terms for mixed pyroclastic-epiclastic rocks
Pyroclastic	Tuffites (mixed pyroclastic-epiclastic)	Epiclastic (volcanic or nonvolcanic)	Average clast size (mm)
Agglomerate, agglutinate pyroclastic breccia	Tuffaceous conglomerate, tuffaceous breccia	Conglomerate, Breccia	> 64
Lapillistone	Tuffaceous conglomerate, tuffaceous breccia	Conglomerate, Breccia	2 – 64
Coarse ash tuff	Tuffaceous sandstone	Sandstone	0.0625 – 2
Fine ash tuff	Tuffaceous siltstone	Siltstone	0.004 – 0.0625
Fine ash tuff	Tuffaceous mudstone, tuffaceous shale	Mudstone, shale	< 0.004
75–100% pyroclasts	25–75% pyroclasts	0–25% pyroclasts	

== See also ==
- Peperite
- Tuffite
