= List of New Mexico railroads =

The following railroads operate in the US state of New Mexico.

== Common freight carriers ==
- Arizona Eastern Railway (AZER)
- BNSF Railway (BNSF)
- New Mexico Central Railroad (NMC)
- Santa Fe Southern Railway (SFSR)
- Santa Teresa Southern Railroad (STS)
- Southwestern Railroad (SW)
- Texas and New Mexico Railroad (TXN)
- Union Pacific Railroad (UP)

== Private freight carriers ==
- Escalante Western Railway
- Navajo Mine Railroad

== Passenger carriers ==
- Amtrak (AMTK)
- Cumbres and Toltec Scenic Railroad
- New Mexico Rail Runner Express (NMRX)

== Defunct railroads ==
Name	Mark	System (Note: This is one or more of the Class I railroads that the railroad became part of, if any.)	From	To	Successor	Notes
Alamogordo and Sacramento Mountain Railway		SP	1898	1937	El Paso and Southwestern Railroad	
Albuquerque Eastern Railway		ATSF	1901	1908	New Mexico Central Railroad	
Arizona and Colorado Railroad		SP	1904	1910	Arizona Eastern Railroad	
Arizona Eastern Railroad		SP	1904	1955	Southern Pacific Company	
Arizona and New Mexico Railway		SP	1883	1935	El Paso and Southwestern Railroad	
Atchison, Topeka and Santa Fe Railroad		ATSF	1878	1895	Atchison, Topeka and Santa Fe Railway	
Atchison, Topeka and Santa Fe Railway	ATSF	ATSF	1895	1996	Burlington Northern and Santa Fe Railway	
Atlantic and Pacific Railroad		ATSF	1866	1897	Santa Fe Pacific Railroad	
Burlington Northern Railroad	BN		1981	1996	Burlington Northern and Santa Fe Railway	
Burro Mountain Railroad		SP	1909	1934	N/A	
Cerrillos Coal Railroad		ATSF	1892	1901	Atchison, Topeka and Santa Fe Railway	
Chicago, Rock Island and Choctaw Railway		RI	1903	1903	Chicago, Rock Island and El Paso Railway	
Chicago, Rock Island and El Paso Railway		RI	1900	1910	Chicago, Rock Island and Pacific Railway	
Chicago, Rock Island and Pacific Railroad	RI, ROCK	RI	1948	1980	St. Louis Southwestern Railway	
Chicago, Rock Island and Pacific Railway	RI	RI	1910	1947	Chicago, Rock Island and Pacific Railroad	
Cimarron and Northwestern Railway			1907	1930	N/A	
Clifton and Lordsburg Railway		SP	1883	1883	Arizona and New Mexico Railway	
Colorado and Southern Railway	C&S, CS	CB&Q	1898	1981	Burlington Northern Railroad	
Cuba Extension Railroad			1923	1927	Santa Fe Northern Railroad	
Dawson Railway		SP	1901	1955	Southern Pacific Company	
Denver and Rio Grande Railroad		DRGW	1886	1921	Denver and Rio Grande Western Railroad	
Denver and Rio Grande Railway		DRGW	1870	1886	Denver and Rio Grande Railroad	
Denver and Rio Grande Western Railroad	D&RG, D&RGW, DRGW	DRGW	1920	1970	Cumbres and Toltec Scenic Railroad	
Denver, Texas and Fort Worth Railroad		CB&Q	1887	1890	Union Pacific, Denver and Gulf Railway	
Eastern Railway of New Mexico		ATSF	1902	1912	Atchison, Topeka and Santa Fe Railway	
El Paso and Northeastern Railway		SP	1897	1937	El Paso and Southwestern Railroad	
El Paso and Rock Island Railway		SP	1900	1955	Southern Pacific Company	
El Paso and Southwestern Company		SP	1908	1924	El Paso and Southwestern Railroad	
El Paso and Southwestern Railroad		SP	1902	1955	Southern Pacific Company	
Fort Worth and Denver Railway	FWD	CB&Q	1981	1982	Burlington Northern Railroad	
Hanover Railroad		ATSF	1899	1900	Atchison, Topeka and Santa Fe Railway	
Lordsburg and Hachita Railroad		SP	1901	1911	Arizona and New Mexico Railway	
Missouri Pacific Railroad	MP	MP	1978	1989	Texas – New Mexico Railroad	
New Mexican Railroad		ATSF	1882	1899	Atchison, Topeka and Santa Fe Railway	
New Mexican Railway Company	Unknown	Unknown	1860	1865?	Unknown	Incorporated Feb 2, 1860; Memorial... in Relation to the Pacific Railroad - May 21, 1860
New Mexico Central Railroad		ATSF	1908	1918	New Mexico Central Railway	
New Mexico Central Railway		ATSF	1918	1972	Atchison, Topeka and Santa Fe Railway	
New Mexico Gateway Railroad	NMGR		2001	2006	N/A	
New Mexico Midland Railway			1904	1931	none, route abandoned	hauled coal from Carthage to San Antonio, NM
New Mexico and Southern Pacific Railroad		ATSF	1878	1899	Atchison, Topeka and Santa Fe Railway	
Pecos Northern Railroad		ATSF	1890	1890	Pecos Valley Railway	
Pecos Valley Railroad		ATSF	1890	1890	Pecos Valley Railway	
Pecos Valley Railway		ATSF	1890	1898	Pecos Valley and Northeastern Railway	
Pecos Valley and Northeastern Railway		ATSF	1898	1907	Eastern Railway of New Mexico	
Rio Grande Eastern Railway			1923	1931		Served Hagan from near San Felipe
Rio Grande, Mexico and Pacific Railroad		ATSF	1880	1899	Atchison, Topeka and Santa Fe Railway	
Rio Grande, Mexico and Pacific Railroad Extension Company		ATSF	1881	1881	Rio Grande, Mexico and Pacific Railroad	
Rio Grande and Pagosa Springs Railroad			1895	1914	N/A	
Rio Grande and Santa Fe Railroad		DRGW	1895	1908	Denver and Rio Grande Railroad	
Rio Grande and Southwestern Railroad		DRGW	1903	1924	N/A	
Rocky Mountain and Santa Fe Railway		ATSF	1915	1943	Atchison, Topeka and Santa Fe Railway	
St. Louis, Rocky Mountain and Pacific Railway		ATSF	1905	1915	Rocky Mountain and Santa Fe Railway	
St. Louis Southwestern Railway	SSW	SP	1980	1997	Union Pacific Railroad	
Santa Fe, Albuquerque and Pacific Railroad		ATSF	1900	1901	Santa Fe Central Railway	
Santa Fe Central Railway		ATSF	1901	1908	New Mexico Central Railroad	
Santa Fe Northwestern Railway			1920	1941	N/A	
Santa Fe Northern Railroad			1927	1928	Santa Fe, San Juan and Northern Railroad	
Santa Fe Pacific Railroad		ATSF	1897	1902	Atchison, Topeka and Santa Fe Railway	
Santa Fe, Raton and Des Moines Railroad			1906	1914	N/A	Operated by Santa Fe, Raton and Eastern Railroad
Santa Fe, Raton and Eastern Railroad		ATSF	1906	1924	Rocky Mountain and Santa Fe Railway	
Santa Fe, San Juan and Northern Railroad			1928	1941	N/A	
Santa Fe Southern Railway (19th-century "Chili Line")		DRGW	1889	1895	Rio Grande and Santa Fe Railroad	
Santa Fe Southern Railway (21st century)		SFS	1992	2014	N/A	
Santa Rita Railroad		ATSF	1897	1900	Atchison, Topeka and Santa Fe Railway	
Silver City, Deming and Pacific Railroad		ATSF	1882	1899	Atchison, Topeka and Santa Fe Railway	
Silver City and Northern Railroad		ATSF	1891	1899	Atchison, Topeka and Santa Fe Railway	
Southern Pacific Railroad		SP	1879	1955	Southern Pacific Company	
Southern Pacific Company	SP	SP	1885	1969	Southern Pacific Transportation Company	
Southern Pacific Transportation Company	SP	SP	1969	1998	Union Pacific Railroad	
Southwestern Railroad of New Mexico		SP	1901	1902	El Paso and Southwestern Railroad	
Texas–New Mexico Railway	TNM	MP	1927	1978	Missouri Pacific Railroad	
Texas, Santa Fe and Northern Railroad		DRGW	1880	1884	Santa Fe Southern Railway	
Tierra Amarilla Southern Railroad		DRGW	1892	1902	Denver and Rio Grande Railroad	
Tucumcari and Memphis Railway		RI	1909	1910	Chicago, Rock Island and El Paso Railway	
Union Pacific, Denver and Gulf Railway		CB&Q	1890	1898	Colorado and Southern Railway	

Private

- Silver City, Pinos Altos and Mogollon Railroad
- United States Potash Railroad

Electric

- Albuquerque Traction Company
- Citizens' Traction Company
- City Electric Company
- Las Vegas Railway and Power Company
- Las Vegas and Hot Springs Electric Railway, Light and Power Company
- Las Vegas Transit Company
