= Blackshare Formation =

Geologic formation in New Mexico, USA

- Stratigraphic range: Miocene, 23–11.6 Ma
- Type: Formation
- Unit of: Santa Fe Group
- Underlies: Tuerto Formation
- Overlies: Tanos Formation
- Thickness: Over 1,260 m (4,130 ft)

Lithology
- Primary: Sandstone, conglomerate
- Other: Mudstone

Location
- Coordinates: 35.418°N 106.307°W
- Region: New Mexico
- Country: United States

Type section
- Named for: Blackshare Ranch
- Named by: S.D. Connell and S.M. Cather
- Year defined: 2002
- Blackshare Formation (the United States) Blackshare Formation (New Mexico)

The Blackshare Formation is a geologic formation exposed in the Hagan Basin west of the Ortiz Mountains of New Mexico. It is estimated be to of Miocene age.

== Description ==
The Blackshare Formation consists primarily of sandstone and conglomerate with minor mudstone. The conglomerate forms lenticular bodies, with clasts consisting mostly of Ortiz porphyry with small amounts of hornfels and chert. The sandstone layers tends to be more coarse at their base. The dip of the beds (which is to the northeast) decreases from 16 degrees to 1 degree from the base to the top of the formation. Paleocurrents confirm deposition by stream flow from the Ortiz Mountains to the east. The total thickness is over 1,260 meters (4,130 ft).

The formation is divided into four informal members, described as a sandstone facies, a conglomeratic sandstone facies, a conglomerate facies, and a muddy sandstone facies. The formation interfingers with the underlying Tanos Formation and is overlain with angular unconformity by the Tuerto Formation.

An ash bed about 200 meters (660 ft) below the top of the formation has a radiometric age of 11.65 ± 0.38 million years (Ma).

The formation is interpreted as deposition by streams flowing from the east into a closed basin. The progressive tilting of the beds, with the lower beds showing significant dip while the uppermost are nearly horizontal, may be connected to the uplift of the Sandia Mountains to the south while the sediments making up the formation were being deposited.

== History ==
The beds making up this formation were first assigned to the Santa Fe Formation by Stearns in 1953. They were designated as the Blackshare Formation of the Santa Fe Group by Connell et al. in 2002.
