= William Henry Andrews =

American politician (1846–1919)

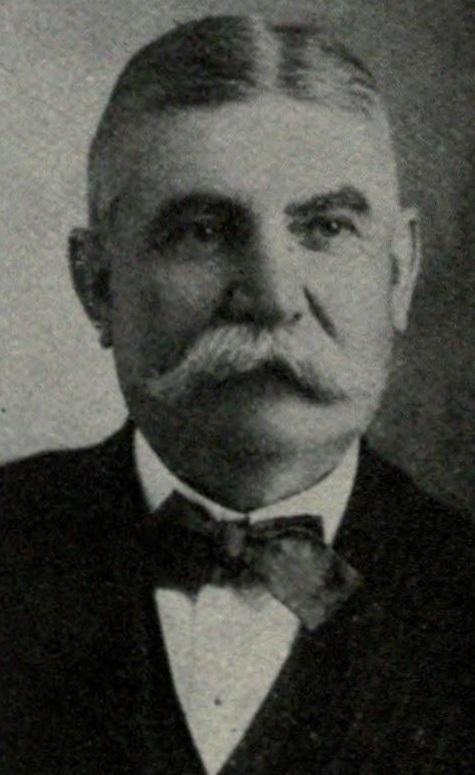

Member of the U.S. House of Representatives from New Mexico's at-large district
- In office March 4, 1905 – January 7, 1912 (Delegate)
- Preceded by: Bernard S. Rodey
- Succeeded by: district abolished

Chairman of the Pennsylvania Republican State Central Committee
- In office 1889–1890

Member of the Pennsylvania State Senate
- In office ?? 1895 – ?? 1895

Member of the Pennsylvania House of Representatives
- In office 1889–1893

Personal details
- Born: January 14, 1846 Youngsville, Pennsylvania
- Died: January 16, 1919 (aged 73) Carlsbad, New Mexico
- Party: Republican

William Henry "Bull" Andrews (January 14, 1846 – January 16, 1919) was an American politician who served as a Republican representative in the Pennsylvania General Assembly and as a delegate from the New Mexico Territory.

Andrews was born in Youngsville, Pennsylvania. He was educated in public schools and engaged in the mercantile and railroad industries early in his life. He was a member of the Pennsylvania State Senate in 1895, and a member of the Pennsylvania House of Representatives from 1889 to 1893. From 1889 to 1890, he was chair of the Pennsylvania Republican State Central Committee. When the voters "retired him from office" in 1902, Andrews moved to Sierra County, New Mexico, where he managed a gold mine (the mining camp now ghost town of Andrews, New Mexico, northeast of Hillsboro, was named for him). He later moved to Albuquerque, New Mexico to get himself re-involved in politics.

Andrews became an astute and dominant politician in territorial New Mexico. A year after arriving, he was elected to the New Mexico Territorial Council. He was elected to Congress in 1905 (narrowly defeating Octaviano Ambrosio Larrazolo), and reelected twice, serving in the 59th, 60th and 61st Congress, 1905–1911 until New Mexico became a state.

Andrews, working with old contacts in the federal government from his days in Pennsylvania politics, was influential in obtaining statehood for New Mexico. He expected to be rewarded by election to the U.S. Senate; however, an alliance between Thomas B. Catron and Albert B. Fall thwarted Andrews' efforts.

Andrews organized and promoted the Pennsylvania Development Company, builders of the New Mexico Central Railroad. While in office, he was blamed for a $300,000 shortage in a Pennsylvania bank, money allegedly used to finance the Santa Fe Central Railway.

Andrews died in Carlsbad, New Mexico virtually penniless. His body was shipped back to his home in Titusville, Pennsylvania and buried at Woodlawn Cemetery. He spent a fortune in politics, always hopeful that he would get a seat in the U.S. Senate. Ironically, Albert B. Fall, after being appointed to a Cabinet position in 1921, said that if Andrews were still alive, he would have convinced the Governor to appoint him to Fall's senate seat.

U.S. House of Representatives
Preceded by Bernard S. Rodey	Delegate to the U.S. House of Representatives from New Mexico; 1905-1912	Succeeded by statehood achieved
