= Tuerto Formation =

Geologic formation in New Mexico, USA

- Stratigraphic range: Pliocene–Pleistocene
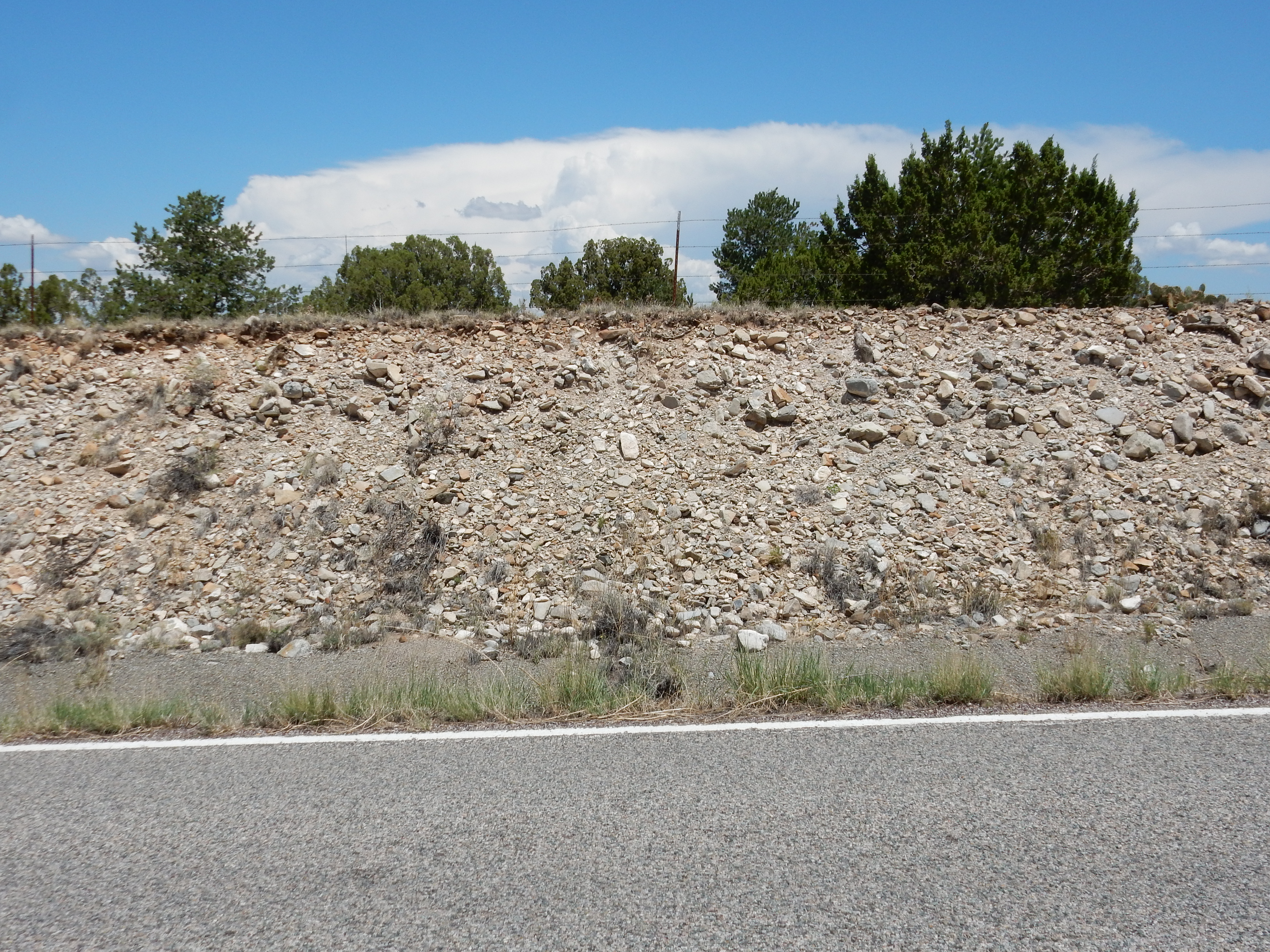
- Tuerto Formation in a road cut north of the Ortiz Mountains
- Type: Formation
- Unit of: Santa Fe Group
- Overlies: Blackshare Formation
- Thickness: 7–21 m (23–69 ft)

Lithology
- Primary: Conglomerate
- Other: Sandstone

Location
- Coordinates: 35.36°N 106.24°W
- Region: New Mexico
- Country: United States

Type section
- Named by: C.E. Stearns
- Year defined: 1953
- Tuerto Formation (the United States) Tuerto Formation (New Mexico)

The Tuerto Formation is a geologic formation exposed around the Ortiz Mountains of New Mexico. It is estimated to be of Pliocene to Pleistocene age, and forms the gravel cap of the Ortiz surface, one of the first pediment surfaces recognized by geologists.

== Description ==
The Tuerto Formation consists primarily of conglomerate with minor sandstone. The clasts (rock fragments) making up the conglomerate consist largely of hornfels and Ortiz porphyry eroded off the Ortiz Mountains and Cerrillos Hills and deposited as a thin alluvial fan in the Hagan basin. Beds containing limestone clasts eroded off the east slopes of the Sandia Mountains are sometimes also included in the formation. The formation is informally divided into a lower well-cemented cliff-forming member and an upper poorly cemented member.

The formation lies with angular unconformity on the Blackshare Formation. It is distinguished from the coeval Ancha Formation in containing mostly volcanic clasts, while the Ancha Formation is rich in granite clasts.

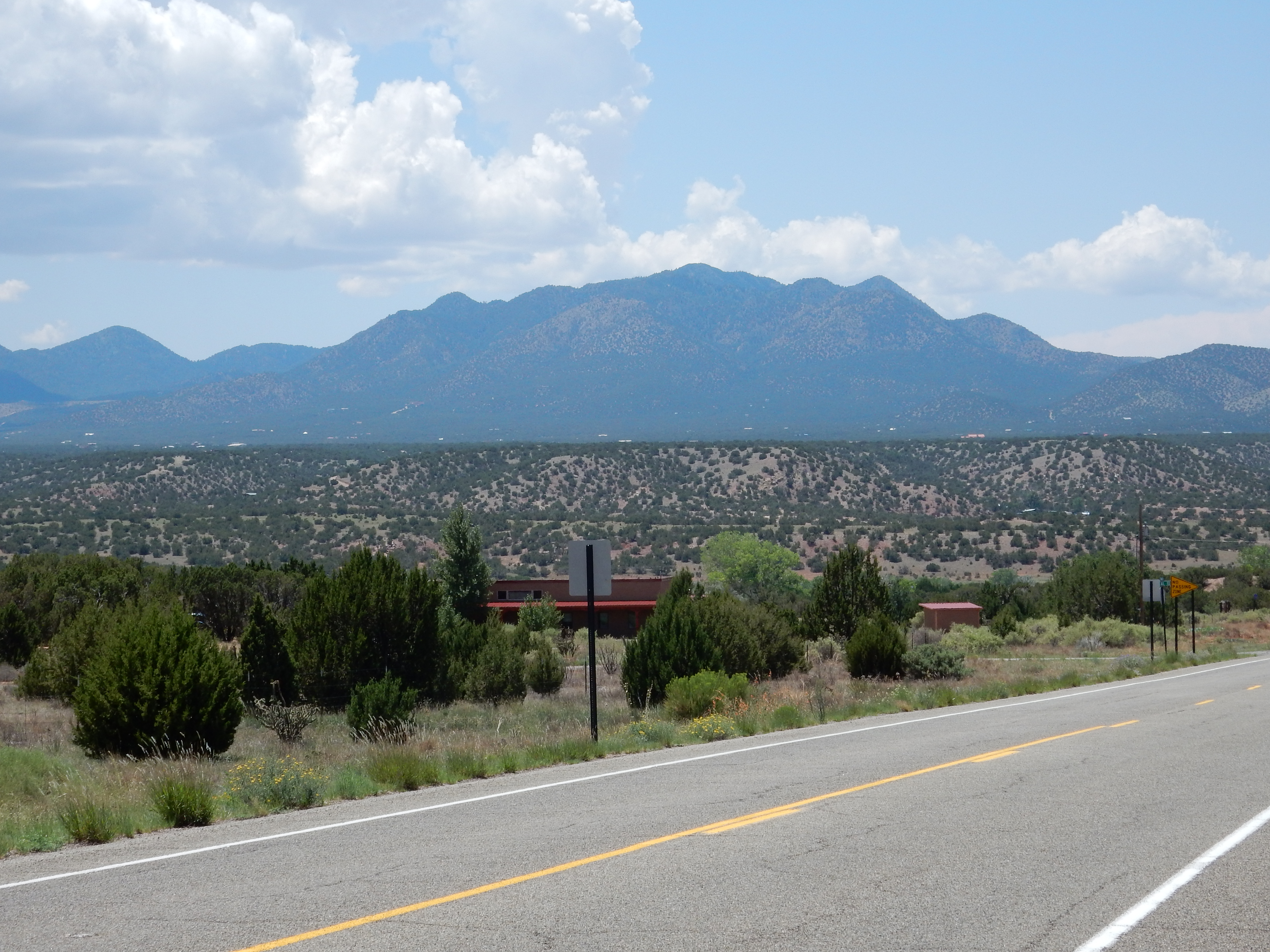
Tuerto pediment surface at feet of the Ortiz Mountains

The unit underlies the Ortiz surface, one of the first pediment surfaces recognized, by I.H. Ogilvie in 1905.

== History ==
The unit was first named the Tuerto Gravel by C.E. Stearns in 1953 for exposures southwest of Santa Fe, New Mexico. Daniel Koning, Sean Connell, Frank Pazzaglia, and William McIntosh described the unit as the Tuerto formation in 2020, and Connell first argued for formalizing it at formation rank in a footnote to a 2002 paper. It was so treated in a draft geologic map of the Hagan area in 2002.
