= Tijeras Canyon =

Mountain pass in New Mexico east of Albuquerque

Coordinates: 35°04′51″N 106°23′15″W

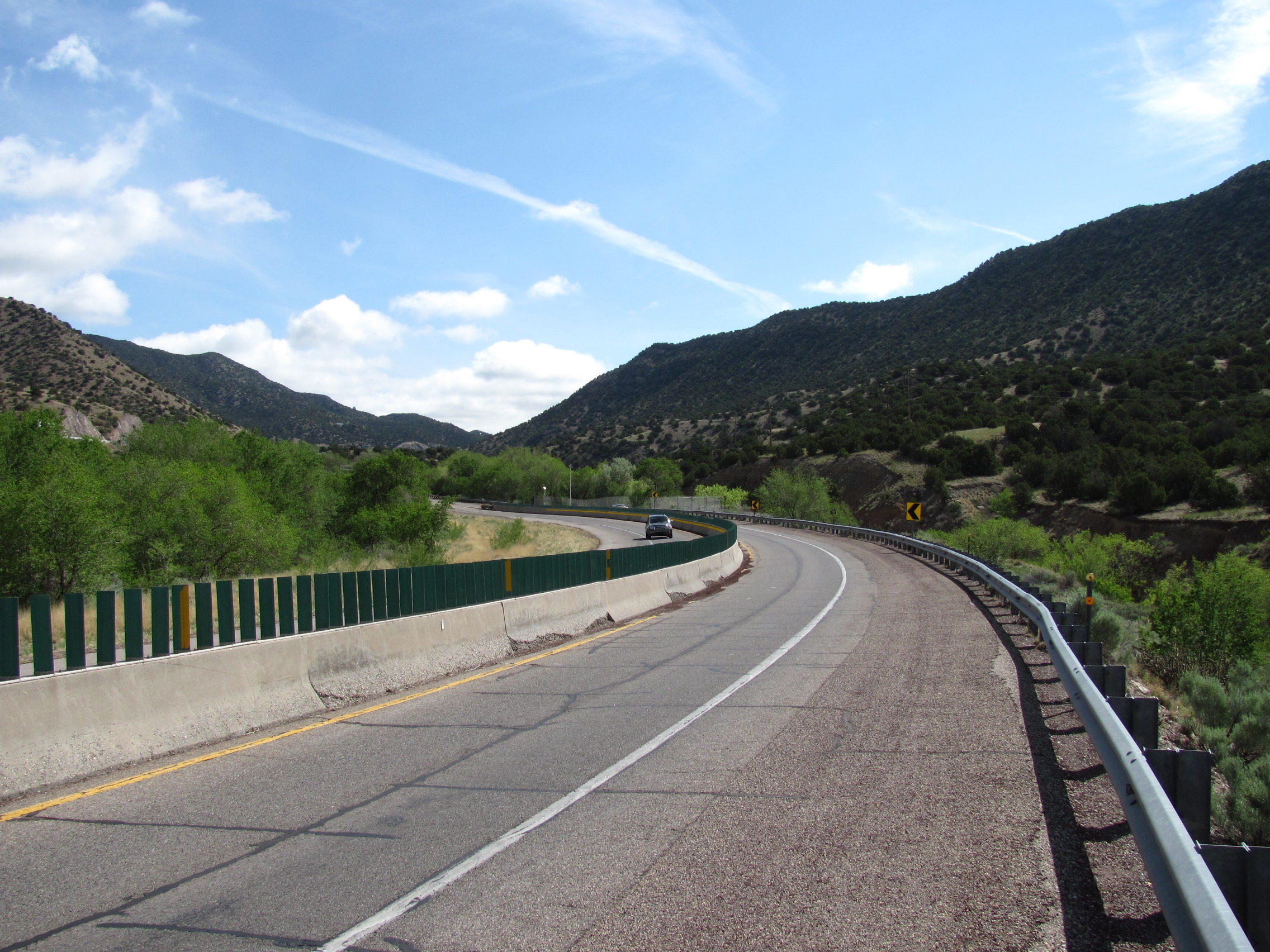
Deadman's curve on old Route 66

Tijeras Canyon (sometimes also referred to as Tijeras Pass) is a prominent canyon in the central part of the U.S. state of New Mexico. It separates the Sandia Mountains subrange to the north from the Manzano Mountains subrange (specifically the lower "Manzanitas" subrange) to the south. These subranges are part of the larger Sandia–Manzano Mountains; Tijeras Canyon forms a pass through this range. Elevations along the bottom of the canyon range from 5,600 feet (1,700 m) to 7,000 feet (2,100 m) above sea level. The canyon drains to the west, into a large dry wash known as Tijeras Arroyo, which runs through Kirtland Air Force Base, passes just south of the Albuquerque International Sunport, and then joins the Rio Grande. The arroyo heads at the historically important pass (approximately 7,040 feet (2,150 m)), and this pass and the entire canyon are traversed by Interstate 40, following the path of historic U.S. Route 66. (Route 66 originally passed through Santa Fe and entered Albuquerque from the North. In 1937 Governor Arthur Hannett re-routed the road away from Santa Fe and through Tijeras Canyon as revenge on politicians who he perceived had thwarted his re-election.)

A railroad, the Albuquerque Eastern Railway, was proposed to run through the Canyon in 1901, connecting to the New Mexico Central at Moriarty, with a branch to the coalfields around Hagan. Some grading for the trackbed was done (still visible at places near the western mouth) but tracks were never laid in the canyon, and the project was abandoned in 1908.

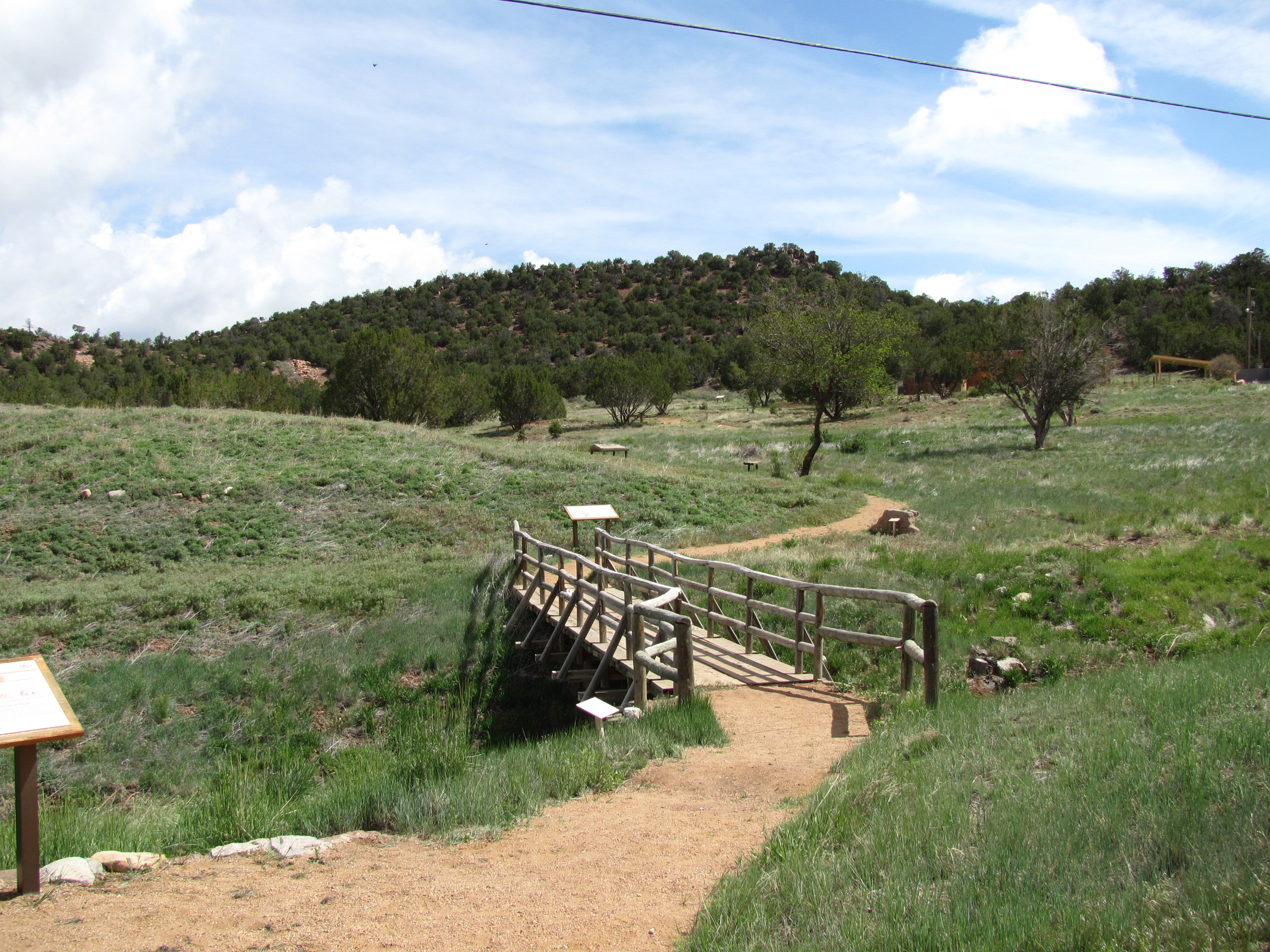
Tijeras Pueblo archeological site

The name Tijeras means "scissors" in Spanish, and the name is said to come from the junction of two tributary canyons, or perhaps of two roads. The name is most properly applied only to the small village, Tijeras, at the junction, as the original name of the canyon was Cañon de Carnué. However the name Tijeras is now almost universally applied to the canyon.

The original inhabitants of the canyon were Pueblo people, occupying Tijeras Pueblo near the site of the present-day town of Tijeras, but the site has long been deserted.

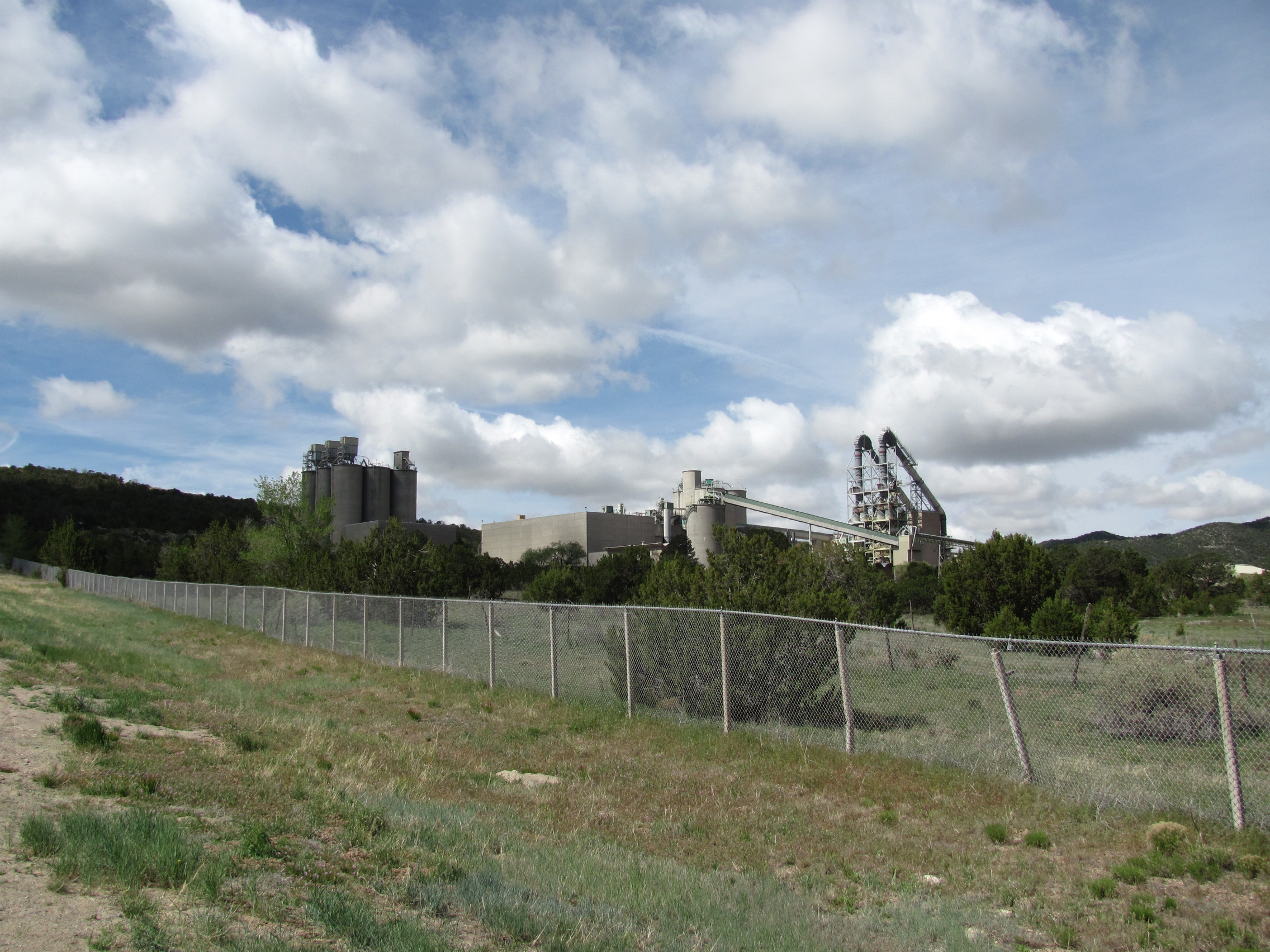
The cement plant

The largest employer in the Canyon is a cement plant which opened in the late 1950s. Its buildings and excavations dominate the portion of the canyon and surrounding hills southwest of the town of Tijeras.

In 1950, the Tijeras Canyon job was the largest road project ever let in the State of New Mexico. It also carried the honor of being the first U. S. Route 66 four-lane divided highway built in New Mexico. Skousen, Isbell & Johnston Contracting Company was awarded the contract. The job reached completion in 1951. The project extended from Albuquerque's eastern city limits to roughly a mile east of Tijeras.
