= Tanos Formation =

Geologic formation in New Mexico

- Stratigraphic range: Oligocene, 25.4–23 Ma
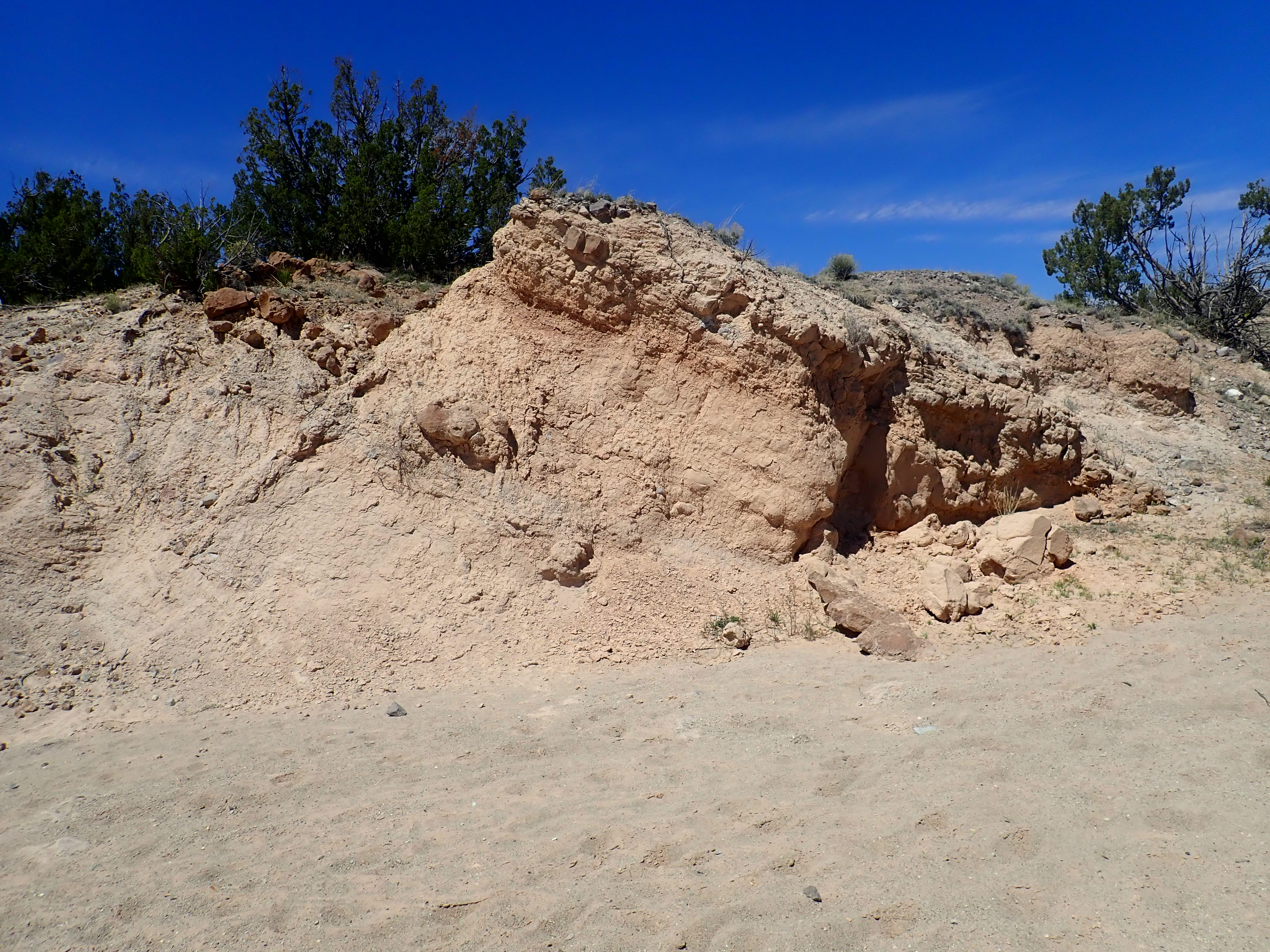
- Tanos Formation outcrop near Espinaso Ridge, New Mexico, USA
- Type: Formation
- Unit of: Santa Fe Group
- Underlies: Blackshare Formation
- Overlies: Espinaso Formation
- Thickness: 279 m (915 ft)

Lithology
- Primary: Mudstone, sandstone
- Other: conglomerate

Location
- Coordinates: 35.414°N 106.311°W
- Region: New Mexico
- Country: United States

Type section
- Named for: Arroyo de la Vega de los Tanos
- Named by: Connell et al.
- Year defined: 2002
- Tanos Formation (the United States) Tanos Formation (New Mexico)

The Tanos Formation is a geologic formation in central New Mexico. It is estimated to be about 25 million years in age, corresponding to the Oligocene epoch.

== Description ==
The Tanos Formation consists of a very pale brown basal conglomerate overlain by reddish-yellow to reddish-brown sandstone and reddish-brown and olive-gray mudstone. It is exposed in a small belt along the east flank of Espinaso Ridge in the Hagan basin of central New Mexico, where it is truncated to the northwest by the San Francisco Fault and disappears to the southeast in the subsurface. The formation is 279 m (915 ft) thick at the type section on Arroyo de la Vega de los Tanos east of Espinaso Ridge. The age is constrained by an interbedded basalt flow at the bottom of the formation that has a radiometric age of 25.41 ± 0.32 million years (Ma). The upper age range is poorly controlled but may extend into the Miocene.

The formation lies disconformably on the Espinaso Formation and interfingers with the overlying Blackshare Formation, with the boundary placed at the highest thickly bedded tabular sandstone below the lenticular conglomerate of the Blackshare Formation. The Tanos Formation dips 20 to 32 degrees to the northeast.

It is interpreted as sediments deposited in a closed basin during early rifting along the Rio Grande rift, and is the oldest exposed Santa Fe Group formation near the Albuquerque Basin.

== History ==
The beds were first studied in detail by Charles E. Stearns in 1953, who tentatively assigned them to the Abiquiu Formation. However, no clasts of Amalia Tuff, pervasive in the Abiquiu Formation further north, are present. The beds were reassigned to the Zia Formation by V.C. Kelley in 1977 and finally designated as the Tanos Formation by S.D. Connell, S.M. Cather, N.W. Dunbar, and W.C. McIntosh in 2002.
