= Espinaso Formation =

Geologic formation in New Mexico, USA

- Stratigraphic range: Late Eocene to Early Oligocene; 34.6–26.9 Ma
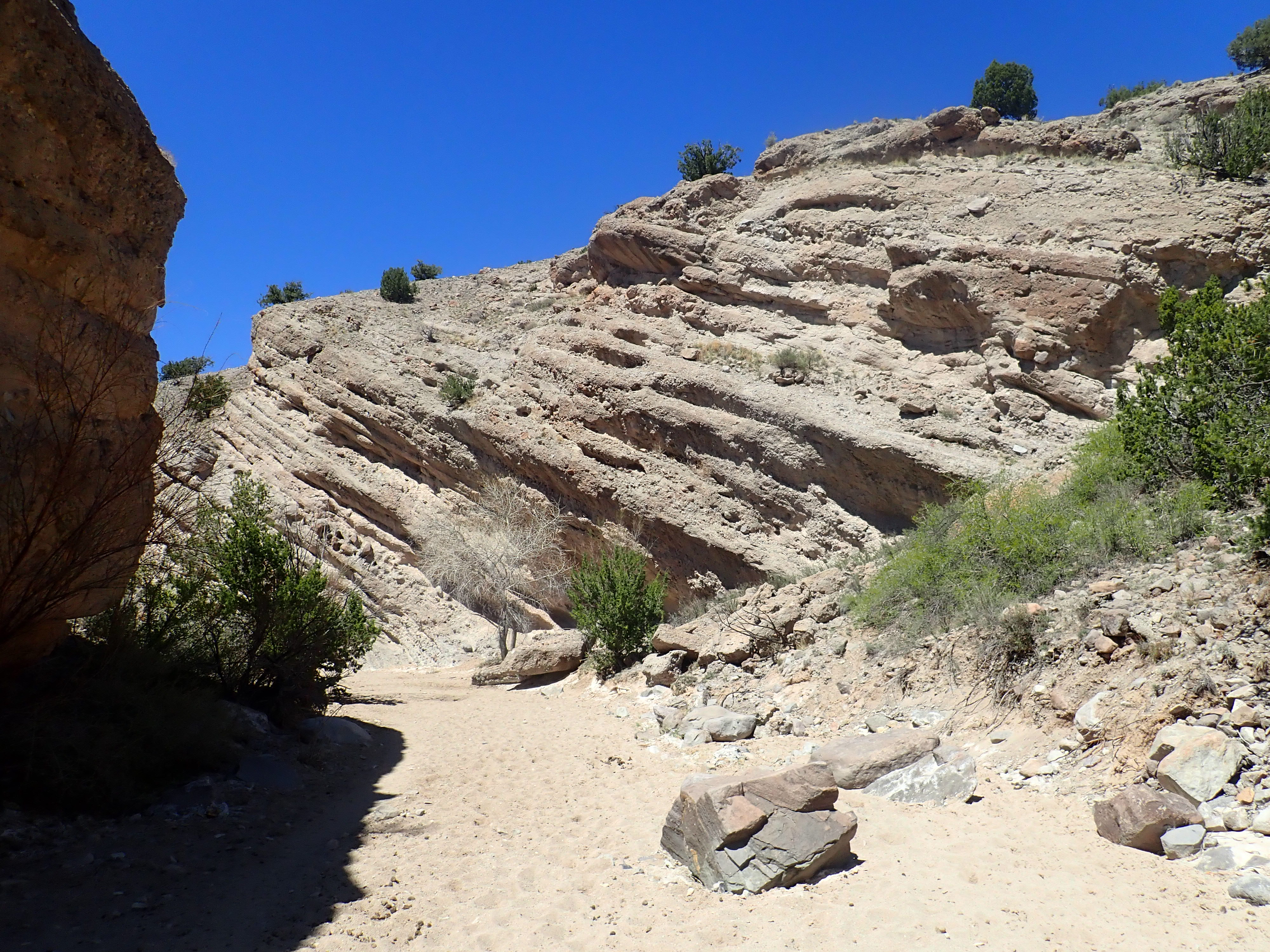
- Volcaniclastic beds of the Espinaso Formation at Arroyo del Tuerto
- Type: Formation
- Underlies: Tanos Formation
- Overlies: Galisteo Formation
- Thickness: 430 m (1,410 ft)

Lithology
- Primary: Volcaniclastic

Location
- Coordinates: 35.4065805°N 106.3183249°W
- Region: Central New Mexico
- Country: United States

Type section
- Named for: Espinaso Ridge
- Named by: K. Bryan and J.E. Upson
- Espinaso Formation (the United States) Espinaso Formation (New Mexico)

The Espinaso Formation is a geologic formation in New Mexico. It has a radiometric age of 34.6 to 26.9 million years, corresponding to the late Eocene through Oligocene epochs.

== Description ==
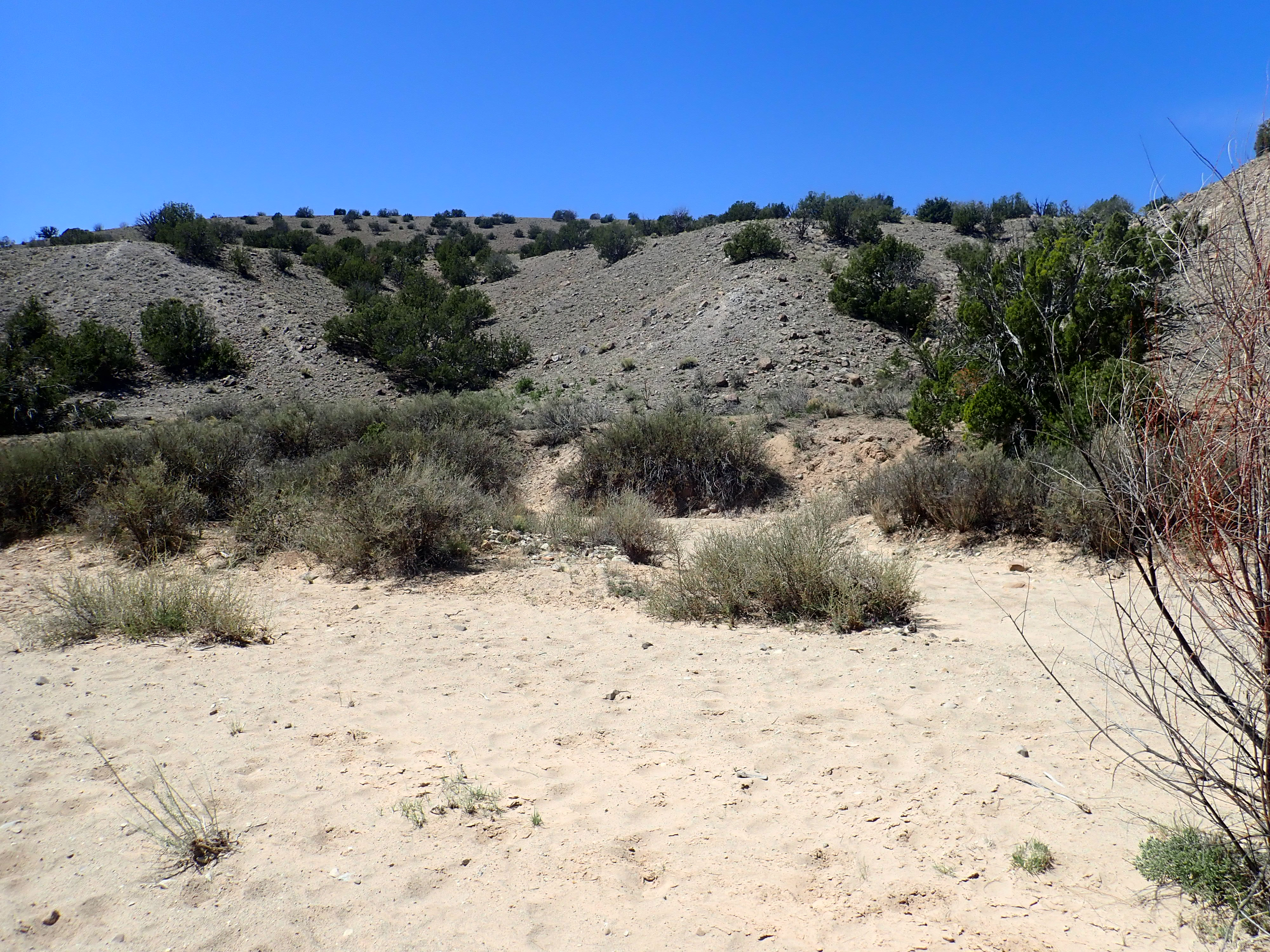
Espinaso Ridge near Arroyo del Tuerto

The Espinaso Formation is principally debris flows and lahars from the Ortiz porphyry belt, with some interbedded lava flows and tuff beds. The upper part of the formation is dominated by upward-fining sequences, where sediments are coarser near the base of the sequence and finer towards the top. This suggests waning volcanic activity and decreasing topographic relief. The formation intertongues with the underlying Galisteo Formation but unconformably underlies the Tanos Formation of the Santa Fe Group. Radiometric dating gives an age range of 34.3 +/-0.8 million years (Ma) near the base of the formation, 34.6 +/-0.7 Ma near the middle, and 26.9 +/-0.6 my near the top. A basalt flow at the base of the overlying Tanos Formation has an age of 25.1 +/-0.6 Ma.

The formation crops out in the Hagan and Galisteo Basins and the La Cienega area of New Mexico. The type section is at Arroyo del Tuerto (Arroyo Pinovetito) where the arroyo cuts a slot canyon through Espinaso Ridge. Espinaso Ridge is a hogback produced by the strongly cemented volcaniclastics of the Espinaso Formation, which contrast with the less erosion-resistant beds of the underlying Galisteo Formation and overlying Tanos Formation. The formation is also found in the subsurface in the southern Espanola Basin, where it was deposited on the eroded surface of a now-buried block of crust that was uplifted during the Laramide orogeny and thrown back down with the opening of the Rio Grande rift.

The formation records the style and composition of volcanic activity in the Ortiz porphyry belt, which is otherwise obscured by erosion of the volcanic centers. The paleomagnetism of the formation has been closely studied, with one study indicating that the block of crust on which the formation was deposited subsequently experienced a counterclockwise rotation of 17.8° ± 11.4°, due to opening of the Rio Grande Rift, but another showing no such rotation.

== History of investigation ==
The formation was first described by C.E.Stearns in 1943, who credited the name "Espinaso Volcanics" to an unpublished manuscript by Kirk Bryan and J.E. Upson. P.F. Kautz and coinvestigators recognized that it was primarily alluvial and designated it as the Espinaso Formation in 1981.
