= Tonque Pueblo =

- U.S. National Register of Historic Places
- NM State Register of Cultural Properties
- Location within New Mexico Location within the United States
- Nearest city: Tejon Grant, New Mexico
- Coordinates: 35°21′49″N 106°21′7″W
- Area: 36 acres (15 ha)
- Built: 1600
- NRHP reference No.: 84003045
- NMSRCP No.: 915

Significant dates
- Added to NRHP: January 12, 1984
- Designated NMSRCP: January 14, 1983

Tonque (TONG-kee) is a large abandoned Pre-Columbian pueblo in Sandoval County, New Mexico, United States, about 7 miles / 12 km southeast of San Felipe Pueblo. It was a site of significant ceramic industry, and may have provided up to one-third of the glaze decorated pottery used in contemporary pueblos in the middle Rio Grande valley.

== Pueblo complex ==
Tonque pueblo (LA240), now a severely eroded ruin, was constructed of adobe and may never have exceeded a single storey. It comprised between 1500 and 2000 rooms arranged in an E, with four parallel arms running approximately east–west, of about 120 to 280 metres length and of 4 to 10 rooms width, and with a continuous block of rooms running north–south, now mostly destroyed, along the west side.

The pueblo is sited on the north edge of Tonque arroyo, a normally dry tributary to the Rio Grande, while a spring occurs on the south side. There is evidence that the arroyo floor downstream (west) of the pueblo was cultivated, probably with maize and beans, which may have been largely dependent on seasonal flooding.

Numerous petroglyphs can be found in the vicinity of Tonque.

== History ==
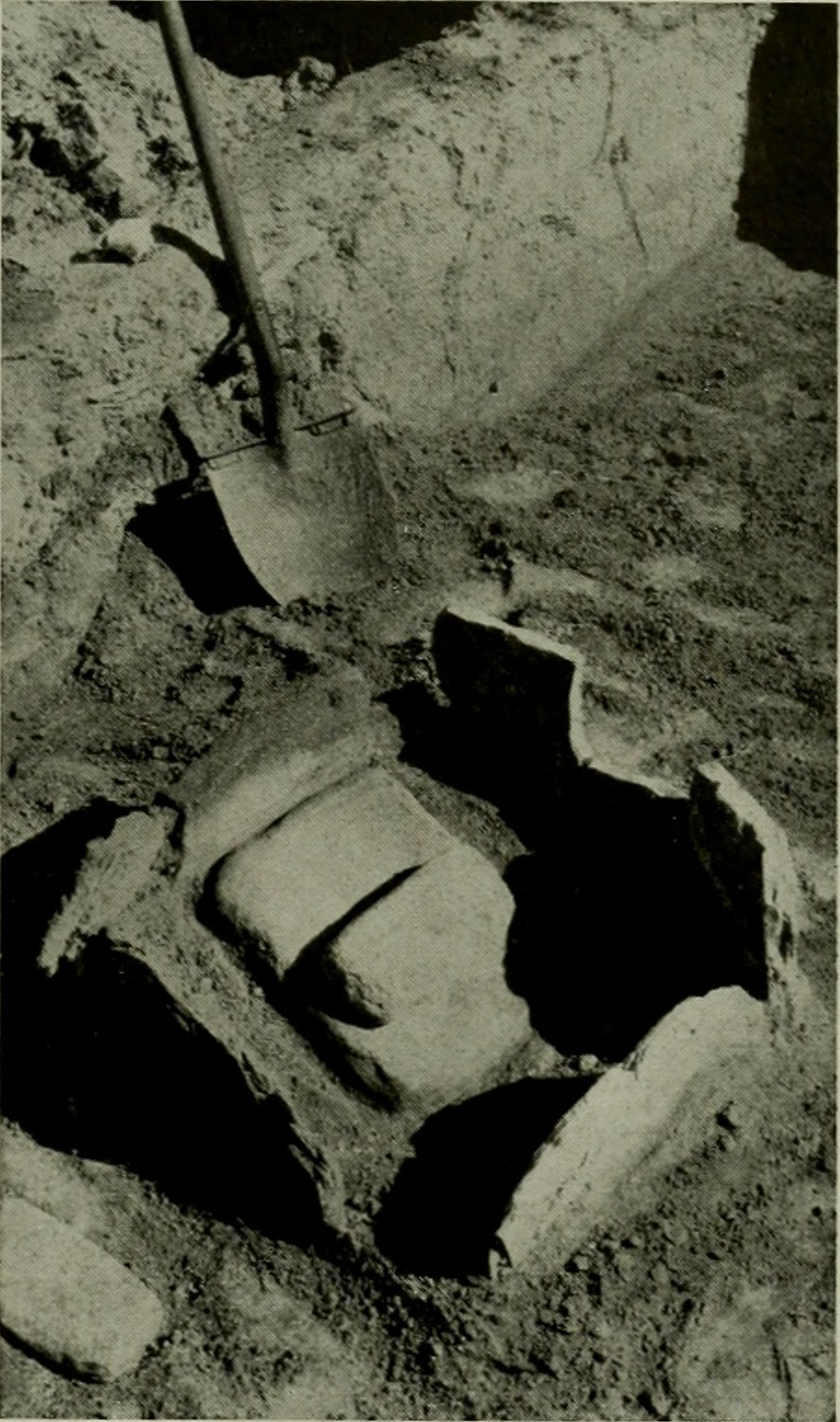
A metate excavated at Tonque Pueblo

Archaeological evidence suggests that the site was first occupied from the early 14th century, and was active until the middle of the 16th century. Tonque is not mentioned in Spanish records by that name, but may be one of two unnamed pueblos visited by Gaspar Castano de Sosa in 1591. Oñate also did not list it in 1598, but it may have been El Tuerte in his record. Alphonse Bandelier stated in 1892 that it was a Tano village known as Tunque, El-Tunque, Tungee or Tun-ge. The word ‘’tung’’, however is Tewan for basket or tray, which implies that it was known as the Pueblo of Basket Makers.

The reasons for abandonment are uncertain. Dendrochronology (Tree-ring dating) at sites in the region indicates that a severe drought occurred in the late 16th century. Various other Pueblo legends relate to general unrest at that time. De Sosa’s journal entry recounts that the two pueblos he visited had been abandoned “only days before,” with evidence of many deaths, and that natives in his party told him that the abandonment was the result of war with other tribes. Evidence from excavation at Tonque suggests that it was already in decline by that time.

== Ceramics industry ==
The arroyo banks provide clay of very high quality, and mica-like materials for tempering are also found nearby. Lead ore and associated minerals for glaze paint can be found in the nearby Ortiz Mountains. The fired clay of Tonque is of cream to light orange color with a crystal tuff tempering.

Tonque became a major producer of glaze-on-yellow pottery, of excellent craftsmanship, color and design, between AD 1350 and 1450. Dating is based on variations in the glaze and pattern, referred to by archaeologists as Glaze Periods A through C for wares at Tonque. The presence of Glaze Period F sherds suggests a possible reoccupation in the late seventeenth century, but no artefacts have been found datable to the period between the late 16th and middle 17th.

Collections of Tonque pottery owned by the Albuquerque Archaeological Society are housed at the Maxwell Museum of Anthropology at the University of New Mexico.

== 20th century ==
During development of coal mining at Hagan about 4.5 miles / 7.5 km southeast of the pueblo, a brick factory, Tonque Brick and Tile Company, was constructed in 1912 at the south-western corner of the ruins, making use of the clay deposits. An archaeological dig was conducted in 1914 by Nels C. Nelson, who dug 266 rooms on the western side, much of which was later obliterated by the quarrying of brickmaking clay. In 1933 The Archaeological Society of Albuquerque High School dug the only known kiva. Amateur archaeologists reported digging 144 rooms in 1969.

A railroad was constructed in 1924 to serve Hagan and passed just north of the ruins, serving also the brick factory. When the mines played out, the railroad ceased operations in 1933 and was removed. Unpaved Indian Service Road 844/Madera Road now follows the old trackbed. The brick factory closed in 1942, and little more than the foundations now remain.

The ruins are on land owned by San Felipe Pueblo, and are considered a sacred site. Tonque Pueblo is not open to the public, except by occasional organized tours.

== See also ==
- National Register of Historic Places listings in Sandoval County, New Mexico
