= Lac Minerals Ltd v International Corona Resources Ltd =

- Supreme Court of Canada

Hearing: 11–12 October 1988 Judgment: 11 August 1989
- Citations: 1989 CanLII 34 (SCC), [1989] 2 SCR 574
- Docket No.: 20571
- Prior history: APPEAL from a judgment of the Ontario Court of Appeal, (1987), 44 D.L.R. (4th) 592, (1987) 62 O.R. (2d) 1, dismissing an appeal from a judgment of R. Holland J., (1986), 25 D.L.R. (4th) 504, 53 O.R. (2d) 737.
- Ruling: Appeal dismissed

Court membership
- Chief Justice: Brian Dickson; Puisne Justices: William McIntyre, Antonio Lamer, Bertha Wilson, Gérard La Forest, Claire L'Heureux-Dubé, John Sopinka, Charles Gonthier, Peter Cory

Reasons given
- Majority: La Forest J
- Concurrence: Wilson J
- Concur/dissent: Sopinka J, joined by McIntyre J
- Concur/dissent: Lamer J

Lac Minerals Ltd v International Corona Resources Ltd is a landmark Supreme Court of Canada decision on the nature of fiduciary and confidential relationships that can be created in the course of business, together with appropriate remedies for restitution when such relationships are breached.

== The facts ==
International Corona was a junior mining company that was investigating the mineral potential of a property at Hemlo in Northern Ontario. Lac Minerals, a senior mining company, heard of Corona's activity and arranged to visit the site. Corona showed Lac's representatives detailed information about their geological findings, together with their underlying theory about its mineral potential and importance. In further discussions about development and financing options, detailed private information was disclosed. Corona was advised by Lac to aggressively pursue the Williams property. The matter of confidentiality was not raised.

Lac proceeded to stake their own claims east of Corona's property, and acquired the adjacent Williams property on which Corona had been negotiating, without the latter having been advised of Lac's intentions. Subsequent attempts by Corona to negotiate the transfer of Lac's interest in the Williams property failed.

Corona formed a joint venture with Teck Corporation to develop a mine on the Corona property, and proceeded to sue Lac for the return of the property.

== The judgments below ==
The trial judge held that there was no binding contract, but Lac was still liable for breach of confidence and breach of fiduciary duty. He ordered the return of the property to Corona, but allowed Lac's claim in part for a lien for the cost of improvements and other payments.

The Ontario Court of Appeal affirmed the trial judge's ruling, also noting that a constructive trust was an appropriate remedy for both the breach of confidence and fiduciary duty.

== The issues ==
There were three questions before the Supreme Court of Canada:

- Did a fiduciary relationship exist between Corona and Lac which was breached by Lac's acquisition of the property?
- Did Lac misuse confidential information obtained by it from Corona and thereby deprive Corona of the property?
- If either question were answered affirmatively, what was the appropriate remedy?

== Decision of the Supreme Court of Canada ==
The court ruled unanimously that there had been a breach of confidence, and by 3-2 it was held that no fiduciary duty existed in this case, and by 3-2 that the imposition of a constructive trust on Lac in favour of Corona was the appropriate remedy.

= majority
= dissent

Analysis of ruling
Issue	La Forest J	Wilson J	Sopinka J, joined by McIntyre J	Lamer J
Breach of confidence on the part of Lac Minerals Ltd	Yes	Yes	Yes	Yes
Existence of a fiduciary relationship	Yes	No ongoing relationship, but a fiduciary duty arose when Corona made confidential information available to Lac with respect to the Williams Property	No	No
Appropriate remedy	Award Corona a constructive trust over that land. Damages are not an appropriate award.	Imposition of a constructive trust on Lac in favour of Corona with respect to the property. The remedy of constructive trust is available for breach of confidence as well as for breach of fiduciary duty.	The conventional remedies for breach of confidence are an accounting of profits or damages. Corona is entitled to damages and related interest.	Concur with La Forest J.

=== Fiduciary relationships ===
There are three conditions that must be present for a fiduciary relationship to exist:

- the fiduciary has scope for the exercise of some discretion or power;
- the fiduciary can unilaterally exercise that power or discretion so as to affect the beneficiary's legal or practical interests; and
- the beneficiary is peculiarly vulnerable to or at the mercy of the fiduciary holding the discretion or power.

There was no element of dependency shown in this case.

=== Breach of confidence ===
Three elements must exist for a breach of confidence to have occurred:

- the information conveyed was confidential;
- it was communicated in confidence; and
- it was misused by the party to whom it was communicated.

The law of confidence and the law relating to fiduciary obligations are not coextensive and yet are not completely distinct. A claim for breach of confidence will only be made out, however, when it is shown that the confide has misused the information to the detriment of the confider. Fiduciary law, however, is concerned with the duty of loyalty and does not require that harm result. Duties of confidence, unlike fiduciary obligations, can arise outside a direct relationship. Another difference is that breach of confidence also has a jurisdictional base at law, and accordingly can draw on remedies available in both law and equity, whereas fiduciary obligations arise only in equity and can only draw upon equitable remedies.

The court can exercise considerable flexibility in fashioning a remedy for breach of confidence because the action does not rest solely on any one of the traditional jurisdictional bases for action - contract, equity or property - but is sui generis and relies on all three.

=== The appropriate remedy ===
The constructive trust was the only appropriate remedy here, given the uniqueness of the property, given the fact Corona would have acquired the property but for Lac's breaches of duty, and given the virtual impossibility of accurately valuing the property. In addition, it was the only just remedy, regardless of whether it was based on breach of confidence or breach of a fiduciary relationship. The remedies available under one head are those available to the other. Given a breach of a duty of confidence, the finding of a fiduciary relationship was not strictly necessary.

== Significance ==
The noteworthy aspect is that the Court is reluctant to impose fiduciary duties on arm's-length commercial parties, and that such duties should not supplant or amplify other more appropriate causes for action.

The consequences attendant on a finding of a fiduciary relationship and its breach have resulted in judicial reluctance to do so except where the application of this "blunt tool of equity" is really necessary. It is rare that it is required in the context of an arm's length commercial transaction. ...the fact that confidential information is obtained and misused cannot itself create a fiduciary obligation. No doubt one of the possible incidents of a fiduciary relationship is the exchange of confidential information and restrictions on its use. Where, however, the essence of the complaint is misuse of confidential information, the appropriate cause of action in favour of the party aggrieved is breach of confidence and not breach of fiduciary duty.

The decision has also served to consolidate the law in Canada on the nature and use of confidential information, as well as to clarify the nature of fiduciary relationships and duties in Canadian law.

Lac Minerals further confirms the divergence of Canadian common-law jurisprudence on constructive trusts to that of English law, which began to arise in Pettkus v. Becker. While English law is based on the concept of institutional constructive trusts (as it was later described by Lord Browne-Wilkinson in Westdeutsche Landesbank Girozentrale v Islington London Borough Council), Canadian courts have broadened it to include remedial constructive trusts. Australian and New Zealand jurisprudence can be characterized as falling in between the other two.

== See also ==
- Meinhard v. Salmon
