= Golden, New Mexico =

- census-designated place
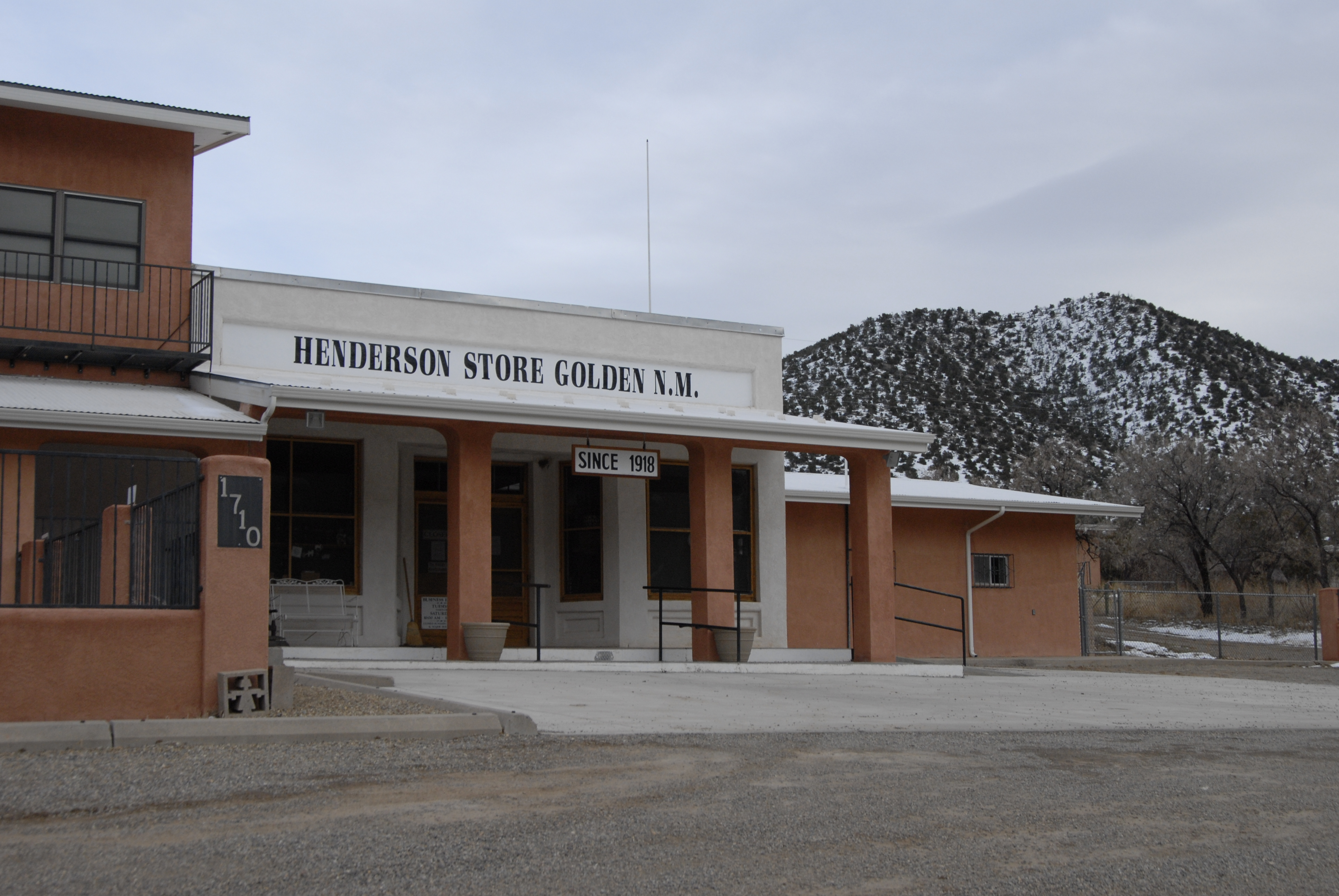
- Henderson General Store
- Interactive map of Golden, New Mexico
- Coordinates: 35°15′25″N 106°13′45″W
- Country: United States
- State: New Mexico
- County: Santa Fe

Area
  - Total: 6.73 sq mi (17.42 km^{2})
  - Land: 6.73 sq mi (17.42 km^{2})
  - Water: 0 sq mi (0.00 km^{2})
- Elevation: 7,061 ft (2,152 m)

Population (2020)
  - Total: 19
  - Density: 2.8/sq mi (1.09/km^{2})
- Time zone: UTC-7 (Mountain (MST))
  - Summer (DST): UTC-6 (MDT)
- ZIP code: 87047
- Area code: 505
- Census Class Code: U5
- GNIS feature ID: 2584105

Golden is a census-designated place (CDP) located between the towns of Cedar Crest and Madrid in Santa Fe County, New Mexico, United States. As of the 2020 census, Golden had a population of 19.

== History ==
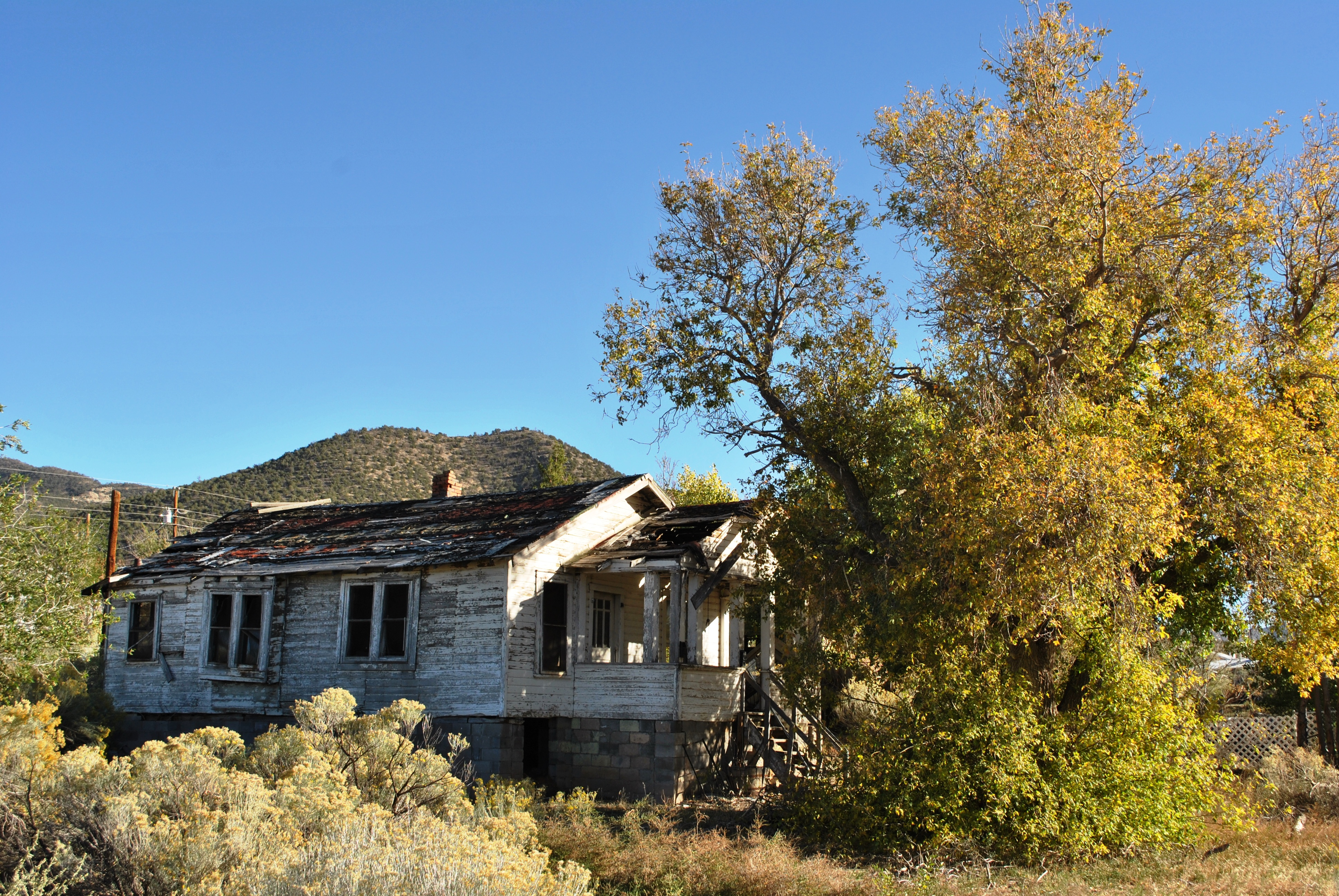
Abandoned house in Golden, New Mexico

Golden was inhabited by Native Americans and Spaniards long before American settlers came to the area. However, it began to boom when gold was discovered in 1825. Years before the California and Colorado gold rushes, the site of Golden became the first gold rush west of the Mississippi River.

Placer gold was first discovered on Tuerto Creek on the southwest side of the Ortiz Mountains and in the late 1820s two small mining camps, El Real de San Francisco and Placer del Tuerto, developed as a result of the mineral finds. The area remained quiet for decades until several large companies began to put money into the mines, bringing in numerous workers, and followed by many individual prospectors. It was shortly after these mining camps were formed that the San Francisco Catholic Church was built around 1830.

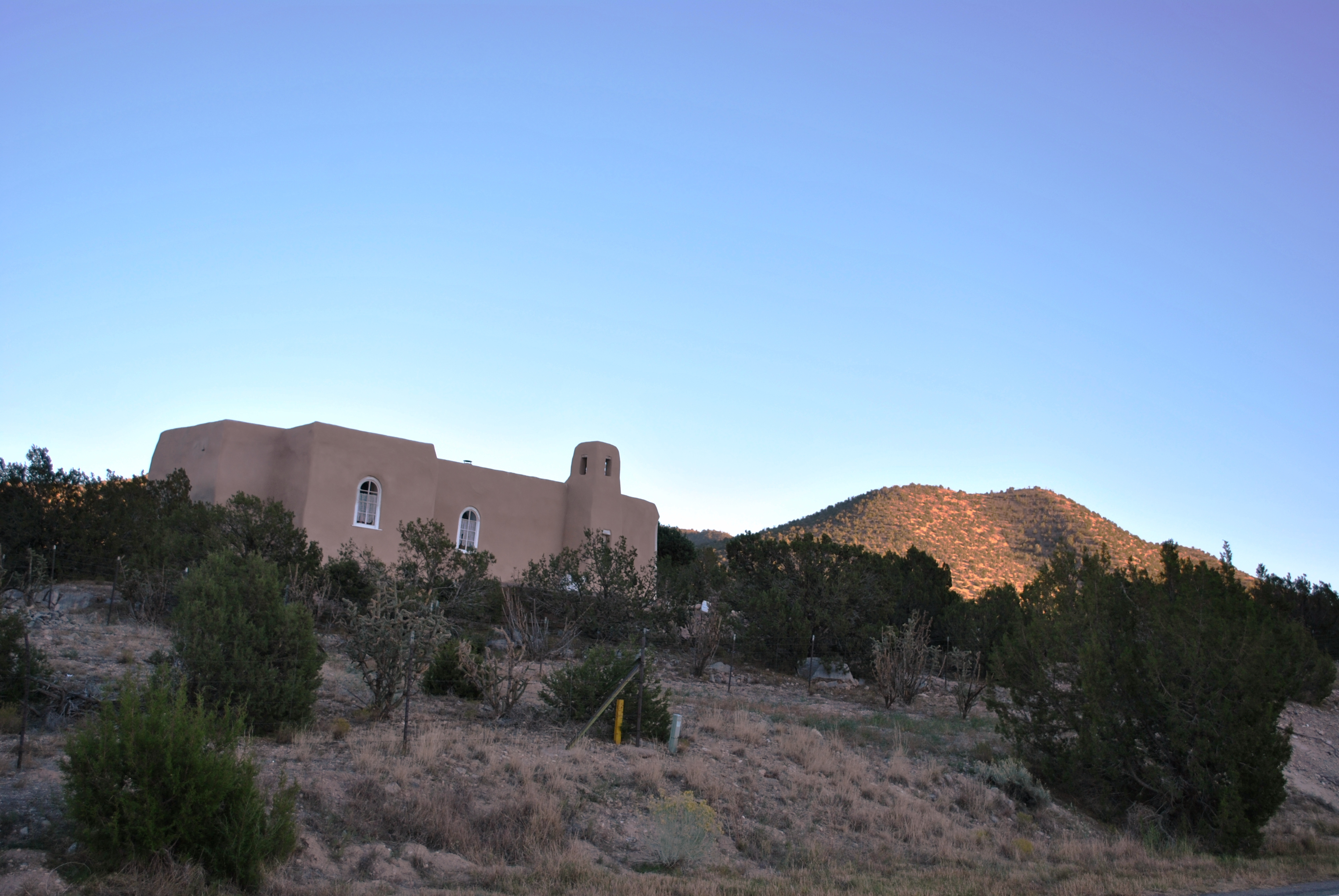
San Francisco Catholic Church

Just south of Tuerto, a new town called Golden was being formed, which soon absorbed both El Real de San Francisco and Placer del Tuerto. Officially formed in 1879, Golden was selected as the center of the new gold-mining district and soon grew to support several saloons, businesses, a school, and even a stock exchange. In 1880, the post office was opened.

But mining continued on a small scale until about 1892 and ranching continued to be a mainstay of the economy. In 1918 the Golden General Merchandise Store opened, which is the only business in town that continues to operate today. It is now referred to by the locals as Henderson General Store, giving credit to its owner.

By 1928, the population was so reduced that the post office closed and Golden officially became a ghost town. For years afterwards, its many abandoned buildings remained, tumbling down between its few remaining occupied structures. During this time, vandalism also took its toll on the town and its remaining structures, but a few crumbling ruins still provide excellent photo opportunities. Golden's most photographed building is the San Francisco Catholic Church, which was restored by historian and author, Fray Angelico Chavez, in 1960, while he was the padre of the St Joseph Church in Los Cerrillos. Across the highway, west of the church, are the ruins of another large structure, as well as mining remnants.

== Geography ==
Golden is located along the Turquoise Trail Scenic Byway and is about ten miles north of the Sandia Park junction on NM-14.

== Demographics ==
Historical population
Census	Pop.	Note	%±
2020	19		—
U.S. Decennial Census

Recently, Golden has seen a small rebirth as new residents have moved into the area, building new homes and restoring others, but still it remains a small village. It is home to the Henderson Store, which sells Native American jewelry and pottery.

== Education ==
It is within Moriarty-Edgewood School District.

== See also ==
- List of census-designated places in New Mexico
