= Bernard Shandon Rodey =

American judge

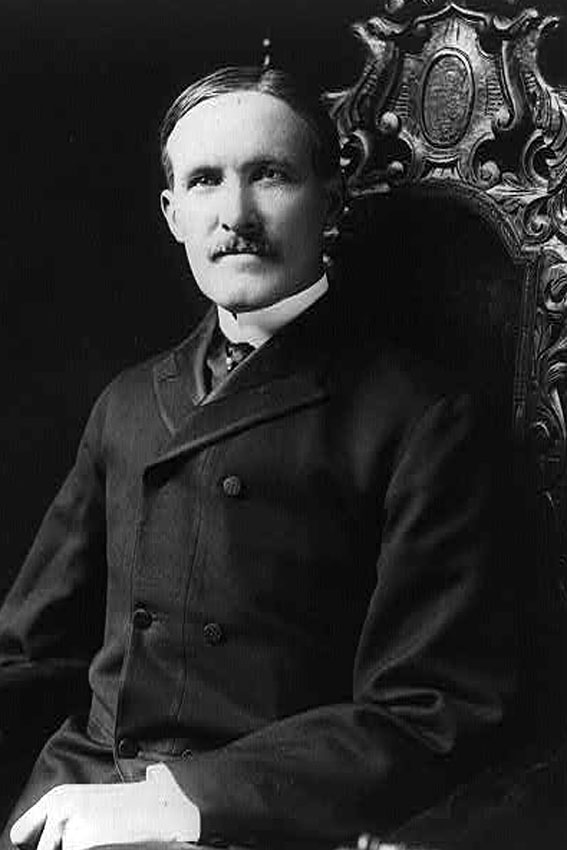

U.S. Attorney for the 2nd Division of Alaska
- In office 1910–1913

Judge for the U.S. District Court for the District of Puerto Rico
- In office 1906–1910

Member of the U.S. House of Representatives from New Mexico Territory's At-large district
- In office March 4, 1901 – March 3, 1905 (Delegate)
- Preceded by: Pedro Perea
- Succeeded by: William H. Andrews

Personal details
- Born: March 1, 1856 County Mayo, Ireland
- Died: March 10, 1927 (aged 71) Albuquerque, New Mexico
- Party: Republican
- Education: Harvard University
- Occupation: lawyer, politician

Bernard Shandon Rodey (March 1, 1856 – March 10, 1927) was an Irish-born American politician who was a Delegate from the New Mexico Territory and later a federal judge in Puerto Rico.

== Early life ==
Rodey was born in County Mayo, Ireland. He emigrated with his parents in 1862 to the Province of Canada, and was educated in Sherbrooke, Quebec. After leaving Canada, he went to Massachusetts where he studied law at Harvard University. Rodey moved to Albuquerque, New Mexico in 1881 where he became employed as a private secretary for the Atlantic and Pacific Railroad Company. He left the railroad to practice law and was admitted to the bar in 1883. Active in politics from a young age, Bernard was elected to the territorial senate representing Bernalillo County in 1889. He introduced legislation to create the University of New Mexico. The bill detailed the acquisition of funds and land for the institution, locating its construction in New Albuquerque. Passage of the bill on February 28, 1889, earned Rodey the title "Father of the University" and Rodey Hall was named in his honor.

== Congressional seat ==
In 1900 Rodey was elected as a Republican to the U.S. House of Representatives as a Delegate from the New Mexico Territory. During his two terms in office, he was best known for his unrelenting fight to gain statehood not only for New Mexico, but Arizona and Oklahoma as well. He fought against a consortium of Eastern senators led by Albert J. Beveridge of Indiana that was threatened by the admission of Western territories as states. Rodey was defeated in a primary fight against William Henry Andrews in 1904.

== Judicial tenure ==
After his terms in Congress, President Theodore Roosevelt appointed Rodey as federal judge for the United States District Court for Puerto Rico in 1906. Rodey's tenure on the bench was controversial and he became involved in the political dispute that culminated in adoption of the Olmsted Amendment and led some prominent Puerto Rican attorneys to unsuccessfully advocate for the abolition of the federal court in Puerto Rico or severely limit its jurisdiction. Rodey left the bench in 1910 and was succeeded by John J. Jenkins.

At the 1908 Republican National Convention, Rodey was one of several Republicans who convinced Taft to promise statehood for New Mexico and Arizona in his election campaign. Rodey was appointed by President William Taft as a federal government attorney in the Territory of Alaska, and then helped investigate a coal scandal in Alaska in 1913. He returned to Albuquerque to found the law firm of Rodey and Rodey, which ultimately grew into the present-day firm of Rodey, Dickason, Sloan, Akin & Robb.

== Private life ==
Although President Warren Harding attempted to persuade Rodey back into politics, he never sought another public office. He died in Albuquerque in 1927 at the age of 71.

U.S. House of Representatives
Preceded by Pedro Perea	Delegate to the U.S. House of Representatives from New Mexico; 1901-1905	Succeeded by William H. Andrews
Preceded by Charles F. McKenna	Judge, United States District Court for the District of Puerto Rico; 1906–1910	Succeeded by John J. Jenkins
