= Pedro Perea =

American politician

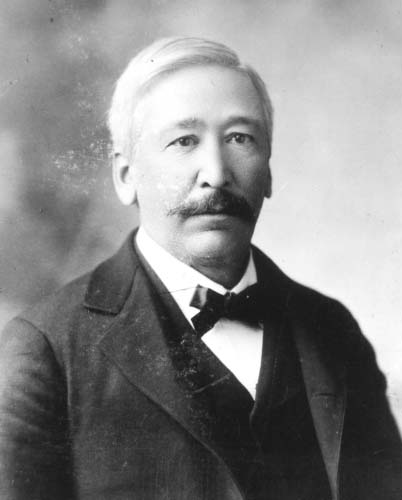

Member of the U.S. House of Representatives from New Mexico Territory's At-large district
- In office March 4, 1899 – March 3, 1901 (Delegate)
- Preceded by: H. B. Fergusson
- Succeeded by: Bernard S. Rodey

Personal details
- Born: April 22, 1852 Bernalillo, New Mexico Territory
- Died: January 11, 1906 (aged 53) Bernalillo, New Mexico Territory
- Party: Republican
- Education: Saint Louis University
- Occupation: businessman, banker

Pedro Perea (April 22, 1852 – January 11, 1906) was a sheep rancher, politician and banker in the Territory of New Mexico. He served as a delegate to Congress from the Territory of New Mexico (1899 to 1901), after serving three terms on the council of the New Mexico Legislature. He was a younger cousin of Francisco Perea, who also served in Congress from New Mexico.

== Early life and education ==
Pedro Perea was born in Bernalillo, New Mexico to a Hispano Catholic family whose ancestors had been in the area since the colonial era. He went to Santa Fe to attend St. Michael's College, Santa Fe, then equivalent to a boys' seminary. He next studied at Georgetown College, Washington, D.C., soon after it was founded. He graduated from St. Louis College, St. Louis, Missouri, in 1871.

== Ranching and politics ==
After returning to New Mexico, Perea owned and operated a ranch where he raised agricultural crops and large sheep herd.

He entered politics in his late 30s, being elected as a Republican member of the council of the New Mexico Territorial legislature in 1889, 1891, and 1895. He served as delegate to the Republican National Convention in 1896. He served as president of the First National Bank of Santa Fe in 1890–1894.

Perea was elected in 1898 as a Republican to the Fifty-sixth Congress (March 4, 1899 – March 3, 1901). He did not run for another term.

He engaged in banking and stock raising. Perea was appointed as Territorial insurance commissioner in early 1906, serving days until his death in Bernalillo, New Mexico, on January 11, 1906.

He was interred in the Perea Cemetery (called the "Bernalillo Cemetery" on Google Maps) in Bernalillo, Sandova County, New Mexico.

== See also ==
- List of Hispanic Americans in the United States Congress

== Sources ==
- United States Congress. "Pedro Perea (id: P000225)". Biographical Directory of the United States Congress.

U.S. House of Representatives
Preceded by H. B. Fergusson	Delegate to the U.S. House of Representatives from New Mexico; 1899-1901	Succeeded by Bernard S. Rodey
