= Lac Minerals =

Canadian mining company

- Industry: mining
- Founded: Incorporated in Quebec in 1981 as Long Lac Minerals Ltd; since 1995 known as Barrick Gold Corporation
- Headquarters: Quebec, Canada
- Area served: mineral holdings in North America and South America
- Products: mining precious metals, copper and lead-zinc mines

LAC Minerals was a Canadian mining company established in 1981 with extensive mineral holdings in North America and South America. They specialized in mining precious metals, but also had copper and lead-zinc mines. In 1994 they were purchased by Barrick Gold Corporation.

== Corporate history ==
Originally incorporated in Quebec in 1981 as Long Lac Minerals Ltd., the company's name was changed to LAC Minerals Ltd. the following year when it acquired Les Terrains Aurifères Malartic (Québec) Ltée, Les Mines-Est Malartic Ltée, and Willroy Mines Ltd. In 1985, LAC Minerals Ltd. acquired Lake Shore Mines Limited, Little Long Lac Gold Mines Limited, and Wright-Hargreaves Mines Limited. In 1992, the company changed its name to Lac Minerals Ltd.. In 1994, Royal Oak Mines attempted a hostile takeover of the company, but a more attractive bid was made by Barrick Gold, and Lac Minerals was acquired by AB Acquisition Inc., which was a wholly owned subsidiary of American Barrick Resources Corporation, since 1995 known as Barrick Gold Corporation.

=== International Corona lawsuit ===
In 1983 International Corona, a smaller mining corporation, sued LAC Minerals for breach of fiduciary duty after LAC had purchased a mining property out from under Corona, when Corona had done all of the exploratory work and had shared the information with LAC. The result in Lac Minerals Ltd. v. International Corona Resources Ltd. was a clear statement by the Supreme Court of Canada on the nature of fiduciary and confidential relationships that can be created in the course of business, together with appropriate remedies for restitution when such relationships are breached. The stock price of LAC Minerals dropped considerably on the Toronto Exchange upon the Ontario Supreme Court's ruling in March 1986.

=== Friends of Santa Fe County lawsuit ===
In 1990 the Friends of Santa Fe County sued LAC Minerals over a number of environmental issues based on LAC Minerals' exploratory work and initial mining in the gold fields of the Ortiz Mountains. Some of the claims were dismissed, but an eventual settlement was reached. Under the settlement, LAC Minerals was required to clean up a plume of groundwater contaminated by nitrates and cyanide that had resulted from the heap leaching of gold ore. Also under the settlement, 1,350 acres of the mine were donated to the Santa Fe Botanical Garden for the Ortiz Mountain Educational Preserve.
