= Albuquerque Eastern Railway =

Defunct railroad in New Mexico, United States

Overview
- Headquarters: Albuquerque
- Locale: New Mexico
- Dates of operation: 1901–1908

Technical
- Track gauge: 4 ft 8 1/2 in (1,435 mm)
- Length: 8 mi (13 km)

The Albuquerque Eastern Railway, sometimes called the Albuquerque Eastern Railroad, was chartered July 22, 1901, by the same parties interested in the Santa Fe Central Railway which was completed in 1903 between a rail junction at Torrance, New Mexico and Santa Fe, New Mexico. The plan was for the Albuquerque Eastern to branch from the Santa Fe Central at Moriarty, New Mexico and run 43 miles west through the Tijeras Pass to Albuquerque. The entire line was graded with a railbed, however, construction was halted in 1905 after only the first 8 miles of track out of Moriarty had been built, due to the Comptroller of the Currency closing the doors of the bank financing the construction.

Other routes were surveyed, including a branch running northwest toward the coalfields around Hagan, New Mexico and on to Algodones or San Felipe; but, none were brought to fruition. The Albuquerque Eastern was consolidated with the Santa Fe Central in 1908 to form the New Mexico Central Railroad.
