= Santa Fe Central Railway =

Defunct New Mexico railroad

Overview
- Headquarters: Santa Fe
- Locale: New Mexico
- Dates of operation: 1900–1908

Technical
- Track gauge: 4 ft 8 1/2 in (1,435 mm)
- Length: 116 mi (187 km)

Originally chartered December 7, 1900, as the Santa Fe, Albuquerque and Pacific Railway Company, this line became the Santa Fe Central Railway in July 1901. Its 116-mile route was completed in 1903 between a rail junction at Torrance, New Mexico and Santa Fe, New Mexico. The Governor of the New Mexico Territory called it “(o)ne of the most important railway projects for New Mexico in recent years….” The principals behind the line also intended a branch called the Albuquerque Eastern Railway running 43 miles west from Moriarty, New Mexico through the Tijeras Pass to Albuquerque. However, construction on that line was halted in 1905 after only the first 8 miles of track out of Moriarty had been built, due to the Comptroller of the Currency closing the doors of the bank financing these railroad construction projects.

The Santa Fe Central was consolidated with the Albuquerque Eastern in 1908 to form the New Mexico Central Railroad.
