= Escalante Western Railway =

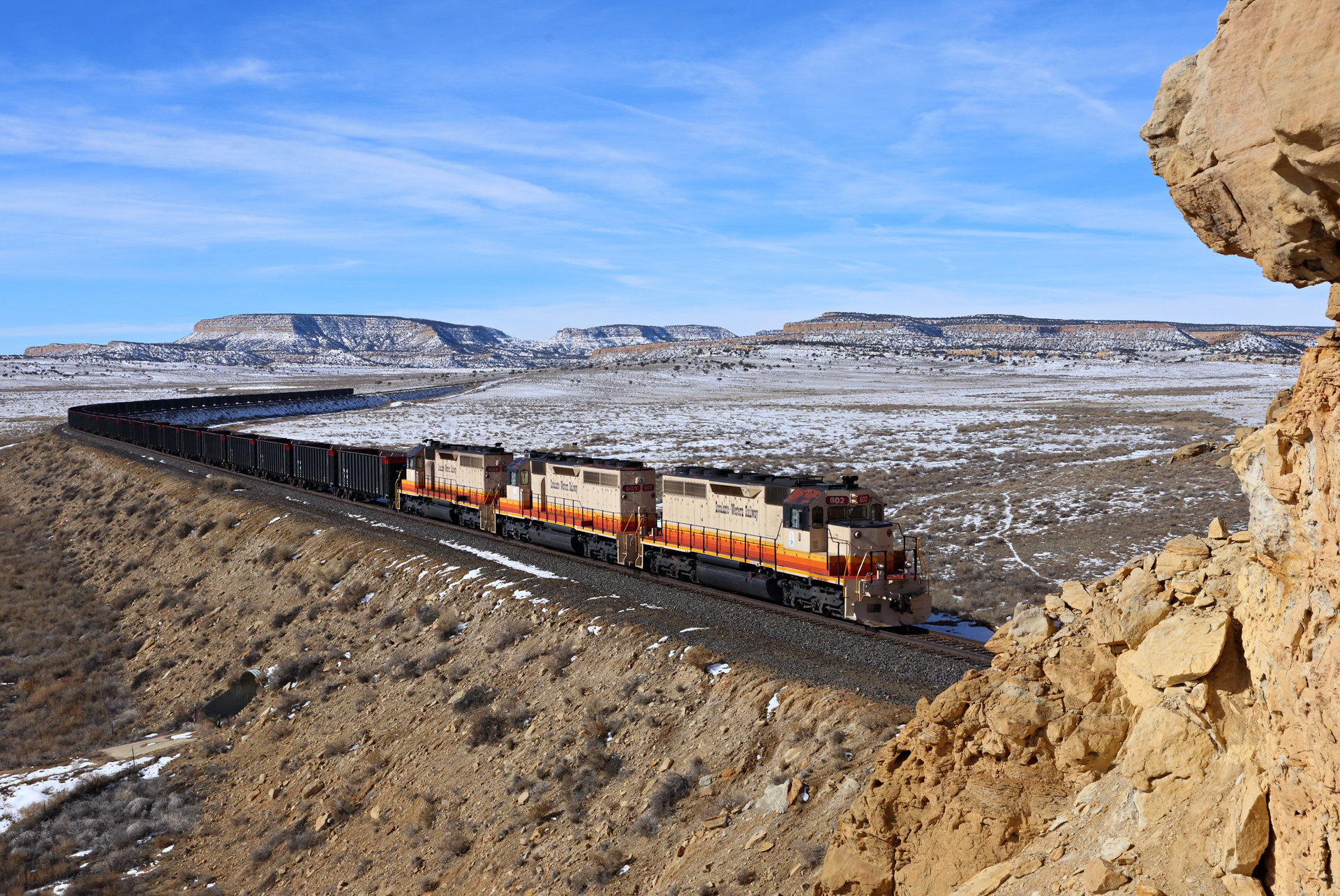
Escalante-Western Railway, Lee Ranch Jct.

Escalante Western Railway is a subsidiary of the Western Fuels Association. ESWR's sole purpose is to haul coal between Escalante Jct. (east of Gallup, New Mexico) and Peabody Coal Company's Lee Ranch Mine north of Grants, New Mexico.

== Closure ==
In January 2020, Tri-State Electrical Co-Op, the owner of the Escalante Generating Station announced the closure of the power plant by the end of 2020. With this announcement, the lone customer of the Escalante-Western Railway evaporated, and the final load of coal left the El Segundo Coal Mine for the Generating Station on April 29, 2020.
