= Ortiz porphyry belt =

Cluster of mountain ranges in New Mexico

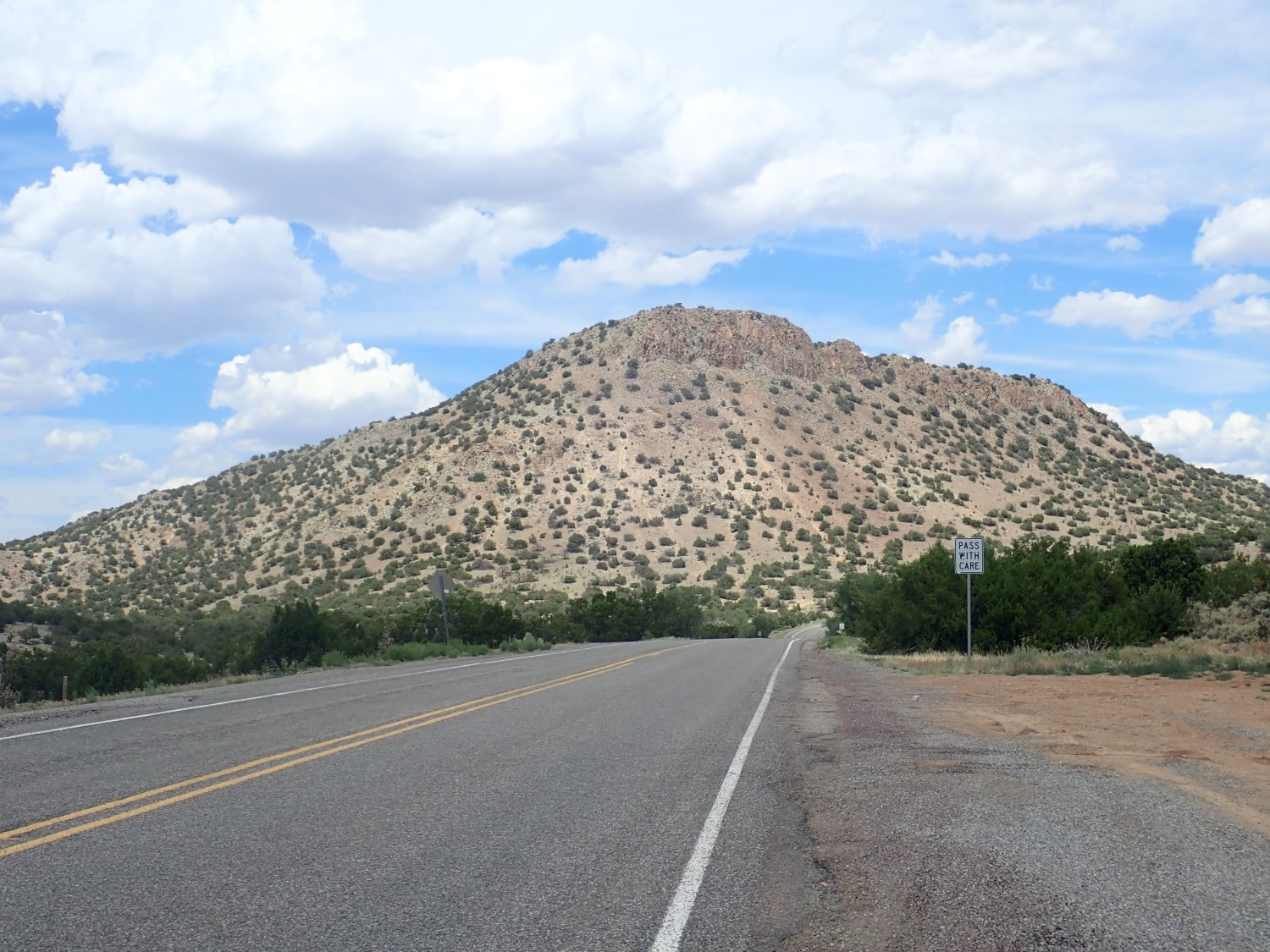
A hill within the Ortiz Porphry Belt

The Ortiz porphyry belt is a cluster of small mountain ranges in Santa Fe County, New Mexico. The mountains are laccoliths formed by intrusion of magma into the upper layers of the Earth's crust. This took place during the late Eocene through early Oligocene, from 36.2 to 31.4 million years ago (Ma.

The belt has been historically important as a mining district.

== Description ==
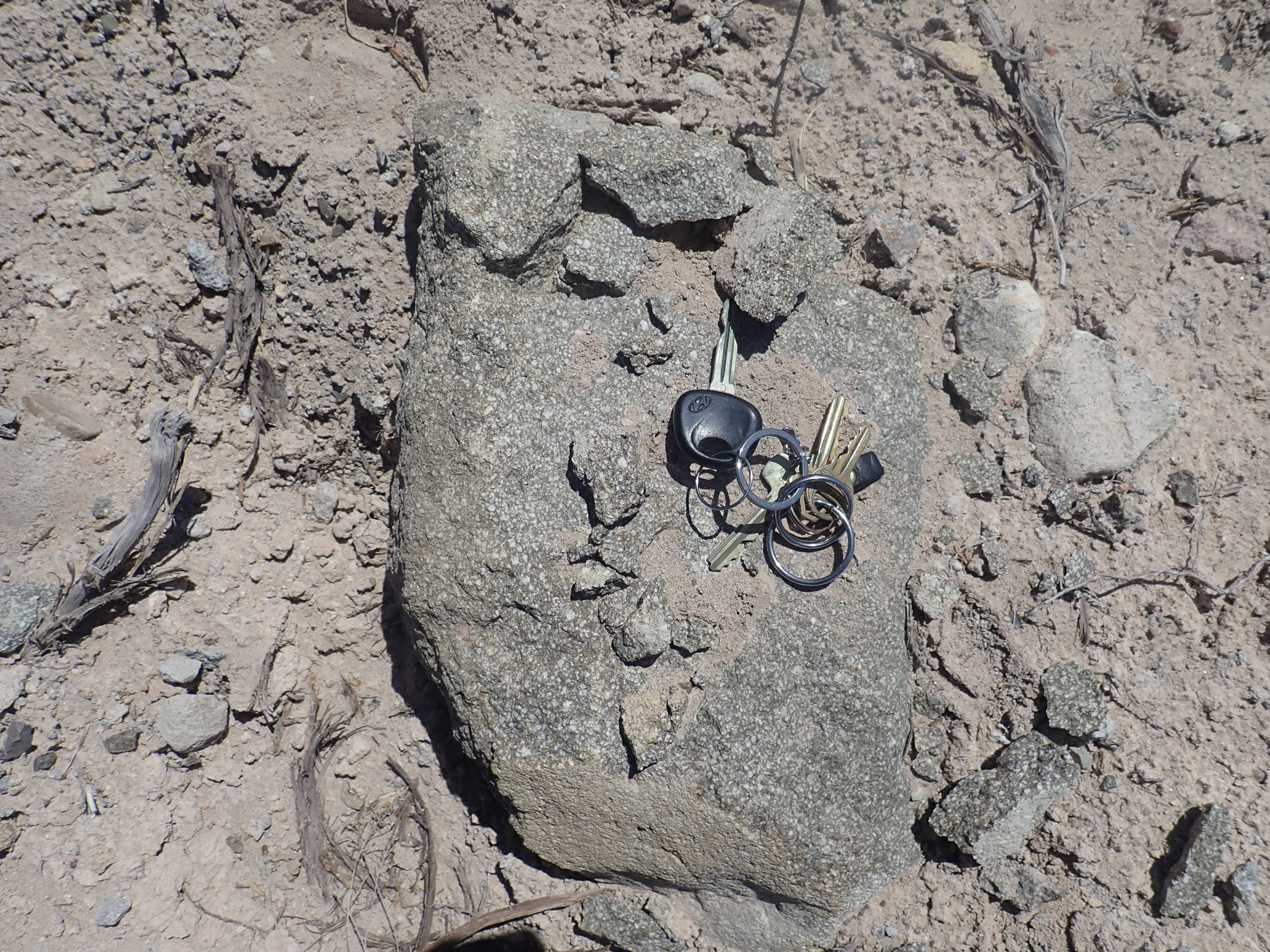
Sample of monzonite from the Ortiz porphyry belt

The main belt extends from the Cerrillos Hills in the north through the Ortiz Mountains to the San Pedro Mountains (35.2463111°N 106.1880296°W) and South Mountain (35.1840457°N 106.2213335°W). Cerro Pelon (35.3266488°N 105.9912396°W) is also geologically a part of the belt. Each of the clusters of mountains is a laccolith where magma intruded between sedimentary rock beds and cooled to form a dome-shaped body of rock. Magma preferentially intruded along bedding planes in the country rock, particularly in beds of weaker rock such as shales of the Chinle Formation or Mancos Shale. In some places, the magma broke through to the surface as lava to form volcanoes. The overlying volcanic rock and sedimentary beds subsequently were eroded away to leave the more resistant laccoliths.

The laccoliths have been radiometrically dated as 33.2 to 36.2 Ma. This was during Laramide compression of the Earth's crust in New Mexico, when the crust was being squeezed from west to east by subduction of the Farallon Plate under the western coast of North America. Compression favored formation of sills and laccoliths instead of dikes. A second set of intrusions at 27.9 to 31.4 Ma took place after compression had reversed and the crust in the area was put into tension, and these took the form of dikes and stocks that are responsible for most of the deposits of metal ores in the mining district.

The rock of the intrusions is fairly uniform over the entire belt and has been described as porphyritic andesite or monzonite. It typically consists of a roughly equal mixture of plagioclase and alkali feldspar with smaller quantities of quartz and considerable hornblende. Clasts (rock fragments) of this composition make up most of the Espinaso Formation in the neighboring sedimentary basins. The Espinaso Formation is interpreted as fanglomerates from Ortiz volcanoes.

=== Cieneguilla basanite ===
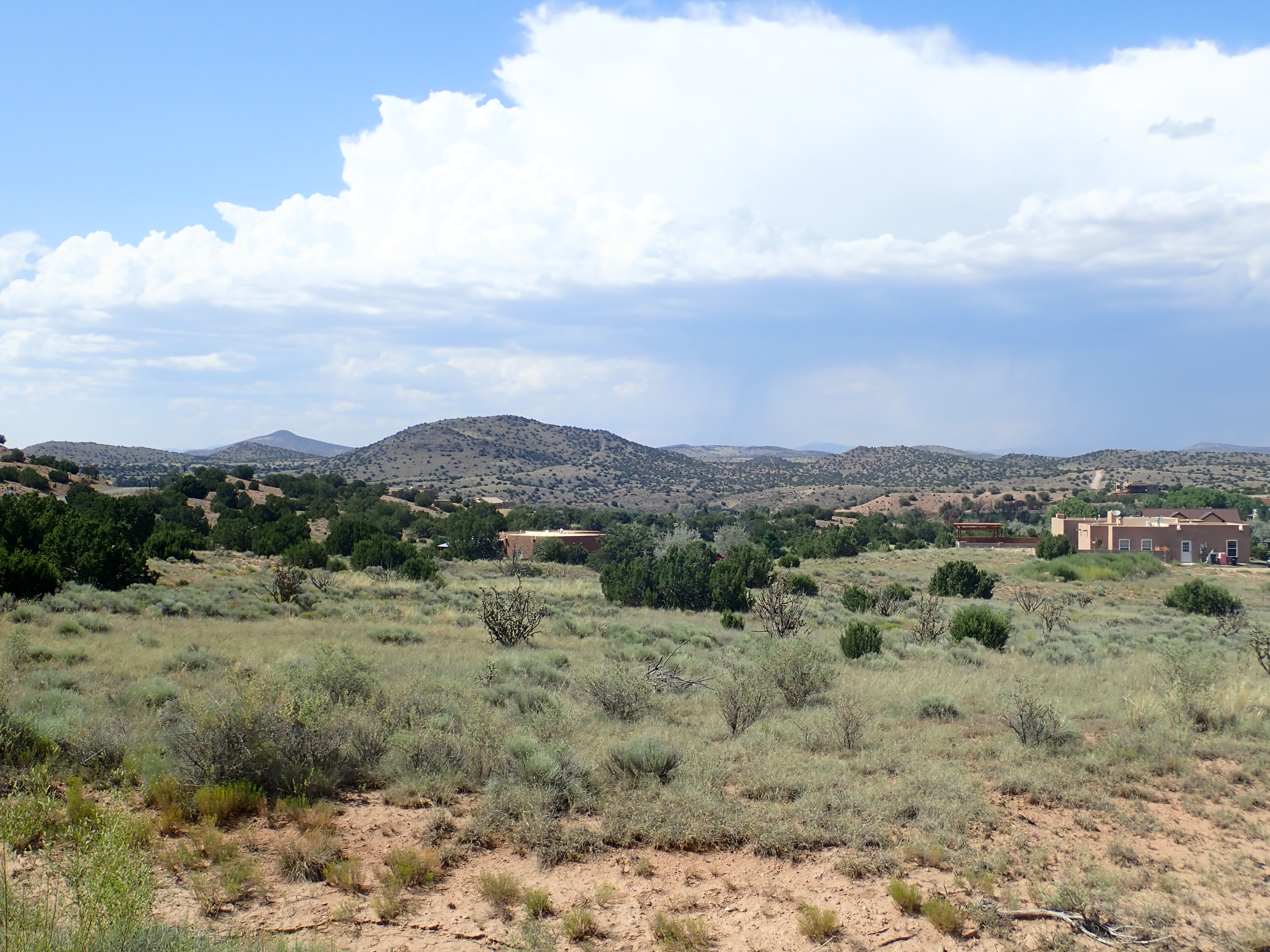
Cerro Seguro, a large hill underlain by Cieneguilla Basanite and Ortiz quartz monzonite

The younger intrusions in the belt are increasingly alkaline in composition, and include the 25-26 Ma Cieneguilla basanite. This is a small-volume extrusive unit exposed around the village of La Cienega that may represent the earliest stages of opening of the Rio Grande rift. The basanite is characterized by larger olivine crystals (phenocrysts) in a very fine-grained matrix of clinopyroxene, magnetite, and nepheline, with a total silica content of 42.40-44.10 wt % and a high magnesium oxide content (11.50-13.50 wt %). This places the basanite among the most primitive magmas of the central Rio Grande rift, meaning that the magma was practically unaltered during its ascent to the surface from its origin in the upper mantle of the Earth. Isotope data suggests that the basanite came from mixed mantle source regions.

== Economic geology ==
Turquoise and precious and base metals have been mined from the Ortiz porphyry belt from prehistoric times. Native Americans worked the Cerrillos Hills for turquoise and galena beginning before 700 CE. The mines were particularly active at the peak of the Chaco culture, around 1000 to 1200 CE, and during the expansion of pueblo culture in the Rio Grande valley, in 1350 to 1680 CE. Turquoise mining was centered at Mount Calchihuitl and Turquoise Hill, the former producing an open pit 300 feet (91 meters) across and 200 feet (61 meters) deep, and was all done with stone tools. Lead was mined for pottery glaze at Mina del Tiro, Bathsheba, and numerous other locations.

Spanish mining began in the 1580s with emphasis on silver and lead ores, centered on Mina del Tiro and Bathsheba. Mina del Tiro continued to be sporadically worked until 1943.

There was a brief mining boom between 1879 and 1881 that produced over a thousand mining claims, but most never developed beyond prospects and only a few dozen became working mines. Mining collapsed after the First World War.

The Ortiz Mountains have been mined for gold since the 1830s. The Ortiz Mine Grant has produced some 350,000 ounces of gold, and remaining reserves are estimated at 1 million ounces of gold and 18,000 metric tons of copper, mostly in Carache Canyon and Lukas Canyon. Mining ceased in the 1980s, and Santa Fe Gold, the current mineral rights owner, has encountered opposition to resuming mining from local land owners.
