= Ortiz Mountains =

Mountain range in New Mexico, United States

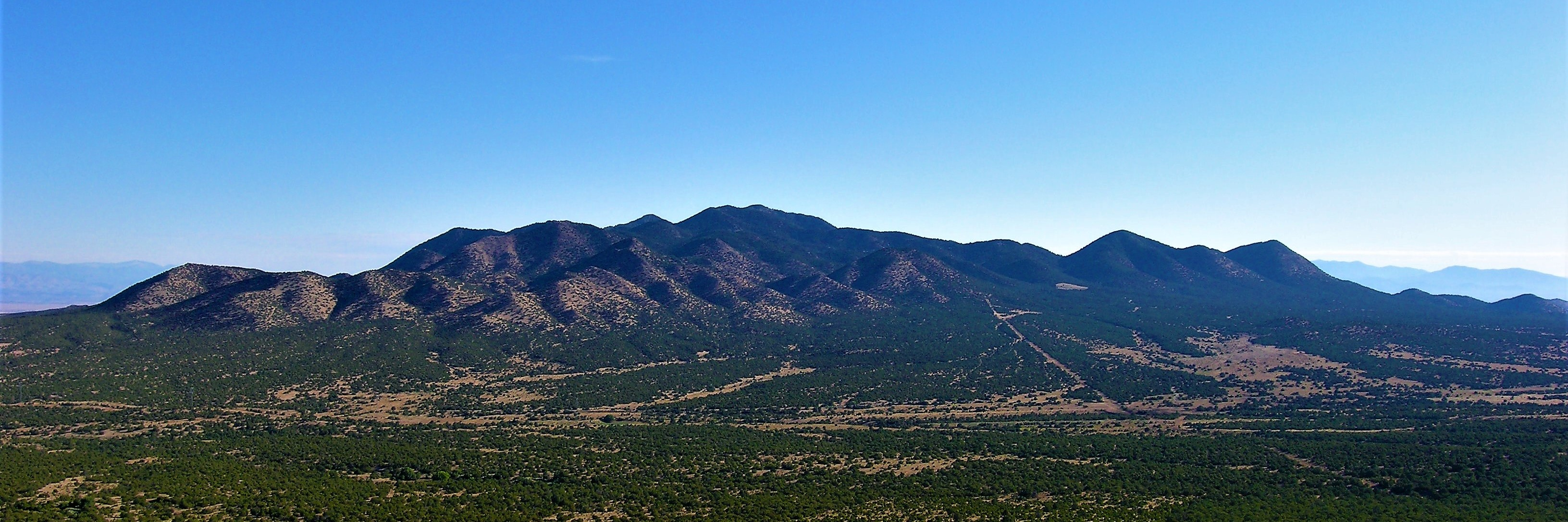
- Ortiz Mountains

Highest point
- Peak: Placer Peak
- Elevation: 8,897 ft (2,712 m)
- Coordinates: 35°20′8.1″N 106°10′11.3″W

Dimensions
- Length: 17 mi (27 km) N-S
- Width: 8 mi (13 km) E-W

Geography
- Country: United States
- State: New Mexico
- Region: Santa Fe County

The Ortiz Mountains are a mountain range in northern New Mexico, United States, in Santa Fe County, northeast of the Sandia Mountains and due north of the San Pedro Mountains. The Ortiz include Placer Peak, the highest peak in the range at 8,858 feet, Lone Mountain at 7,310 feet, Cedar Mountain at 7,041 feet, Cerro Chato at 6,965 feet, and the foothills known as the Los Lomas de la Bolsa. New Mexico State Road 14 passes through the northwestern portion of the Ortiz Mountains between the towns of Golden and Madrid.

== Geology ==
The Ortiz Mountains are on the east side of the Rio Grande Rift, with the Santa Domingo Basin and Hagan Basin of the rift to their west, with the Sandia uplift to the southwest, and the Espanola Basin and the Estancia Basin to the east. They form part of the watershed boundary between the Rio Grande and the Pecos River.

The Ortiz Mountains are part of the larger Ortiz porphyry belt of Santa Fe County, and consist of late Eocene to early Oligocene intrusive igneous rocks and their sedimentary host rock. Other members of the Ortiz porphyry belt are South Mountain, the San Pedro Mountains and the Cerrillos Hills. These porphyry intrusions were followed by movement on the Tijeras-Canoncito fault and later mid Oligocene (31.4–27.9 ma) intrusions of stocks and dikes with mineralization including both base and precious metals.

== History ==
Placer mining for gold in the Ortiz Mountains was carried out by the early Spanish using Indian slave labor, but the first significant placer workings began in 1821. The underground Ortiz Mine was opened in 1822. By 1832, several gold-bearing veins had been discovered. The first gold lode mine in the West was in the Ortiz, as well as the first railroad in New Mexico. The gold separation mill was the work of Thomas Edison. But following World War I, mining costs had risen and the low grade ores and relative lack of water resulted in the last mines being closed.

In 1973, Consolidated Gold Fields opened an open pit on the Cunningham Hill deposit, the same deposit that the Ortiz Mine had worked. Using the heap and leach method, they extracted approximately 250,000 ounces of gold before closing in 1986. A joint venture of LAC Minerals and Pegasus Gold Corporation did exploratory work beginning in 1989 primarily investigating the Carache Canyon and Lucas Canyon deposits. They did open a new adit into the Carache Canyon deposit, but stopped after 1719 feet due to regulatory issues, lawsuits and a declining gold price.

== Ecology ==
Precipitation averages twelve inches per year. The lowest elevations are Artemisia shrublands, known as sagebrush steppe, which give way to piñon-juniper woodlands at higher elevations.

=== Ortiz Mountains Educational Preserve ===
The Ortiz Mountains Educational Preserve (OMEP) opened to the public in 2003. The 1,350-acre reserve was created as settlement of a lawsuit by residents against Lac Minerals. It is owned by Santa Fe County and managed by the Santa Fe Botanical Garden.
