= New Mexico Central Railroad =

Defunct railroad in New Mexico, United States

New Mexico Southern
Overview
- Locale: New Mexico
- Dates of operation: 1908–1972

Technical
- Track gauge: 4 ft 8 1/2 in (1,435 mm)
- Length: 116 mi (187 km)

The New Mexico Central Railroad was formed in 1908 from the consolidation of the Santa Fe Central Railway and the Albuquerque Eastern Railway Co., to operate the 116 miles of track between Torrance and Santa Fe, New Mexico. That line, reorganized in 1918 as the New Mexico Central Railway, was sold to the Atchison, Topeka and Santa Fe Railroad in 1926. The New Mexico Central remained the nominal owner of the Santa Fe-leased line while the Santa Fe proceeded to abandon operation of the trackage in pieces, ending in 1972 with abandonment from Willard to Calvert (Moriarty), New Mexico.

== New Mexico Central Railroad (2017) ==
The original New Mexico Central is not to be confused with the New Mexico Central Railroad (NMCR) which was a newly created company around 2017 with the intent to take over Southwestern Railroad’s lease interest in a line from Rincon to Deming, New Mexico, and to further acquire an ownership interest in lines extending from Deming to Peruhill; from Peruhill to Whitewater; from Whitewater to both the Tyrone industrial Spur at Burro Mountain Jct. and to Santa Rita; and, from Hannover Junction to the Fierro Industrial Spur at the Sharon Steel Plant, all a total of about 116 miles. This proposed railroad company was owned by West Branch Intermediate Holdings, LLC, and was to be managed by Continental Rail LLC. However, the Continental Rail website in 2021 does not mention the NMCR.
