= Hagan, New Mexico =

- Ghost town
- Location within New Mexico Location within the United States
- Coordinates: 35°19′02″N 106°18′50″W
- Country: United States
- State: New Mexico
- County: Sandoval

Population (2000)
  - Total: 0
- Time zone: UTC-5 (Mountain (MST))
  - Summer (DST): MDT
- Area code: 505

Hagan is a ghost town in Sandoval County, New Mexico, United States, about 13 miles (21 km) southeast of San Felipe Pueblo.

== History ==
In 1902 the New Mexico Fuel and Iron Company was established to develop coal mines in the locality. The name "Hagan" was chosen for the site, named after a local official of the AT&SF Railroad, no doubt to encourage the extension of a railroad spur to serve the mines. Initially, coal was hauled by wagon to the railroad main line at San Felipe. Work on the spur was begun in 1908 but was suspended within months, stalling development of the community of about 60 residents for a decade.

In 1919 a "gentleman entrepreneur", Jean Justin DePraslin of New Orleans, convinced investors to put up nearly $450,000 to develop the Hagan Coal Mine, including housing, mine buildings and a power plant. A further $300,000 was raised for a new railroad, the Rio Grande Eastern, and the line was completed in May 1924. As well as the coal, the railroad hauled brick and tile from a brick factory adjacent to the ruins of Tonque Pueblo, a few miles north of the town.

DePraslin developed Hagan as an ambitiously planned company town intended for 500 residents. Over 100 adobe structures were built by adobero Abenicio Salazar of Bernalillo with a team of 100 laborers and 60 masons over a period of three years, in the Pueblo Revival style which was popular at the time. The town was well supplied with electricity and running water. Water was piped from a spring 2 miles (3 km) away, to a reservoir above the town. The general store was a two-story structure which housed a bank, post office, barber shop and pool hall as well as the general mercantile. An eight-grade school was set up to serve 70 pupils.

The town grew from 1924 to 1930 and the population peaked at about 200 people, mostly Italian and Slavic miners from the coalfields of Raton and Dawson, and local Hispanos from Madrid and Los Cerrillos. But in the early 1930s the miners hit a layer of shale which soon widened, eventually choking off coal production. The post office, established in 1902, closed in 1931. By 1933 the railroad, never profitable, ceased operation and was dismantled, and in 1939 the Hagan Mine closed down.

== Present day ==
Only the foundations and a few brick walls of the power plant, general store, reservoir, and a few smaller buildings remain. The site is visible from Indian Service Road 844/Madera Road which follows the railroad grade from San Felipe, but the ruins are on private land owned by the Diamond Tail Ranch and are usually not open to the public except by occasional organized tours.
