= Atrasado Formation =

Geologic formation in New Mexico

- Stratigraphic range: Kasimovian
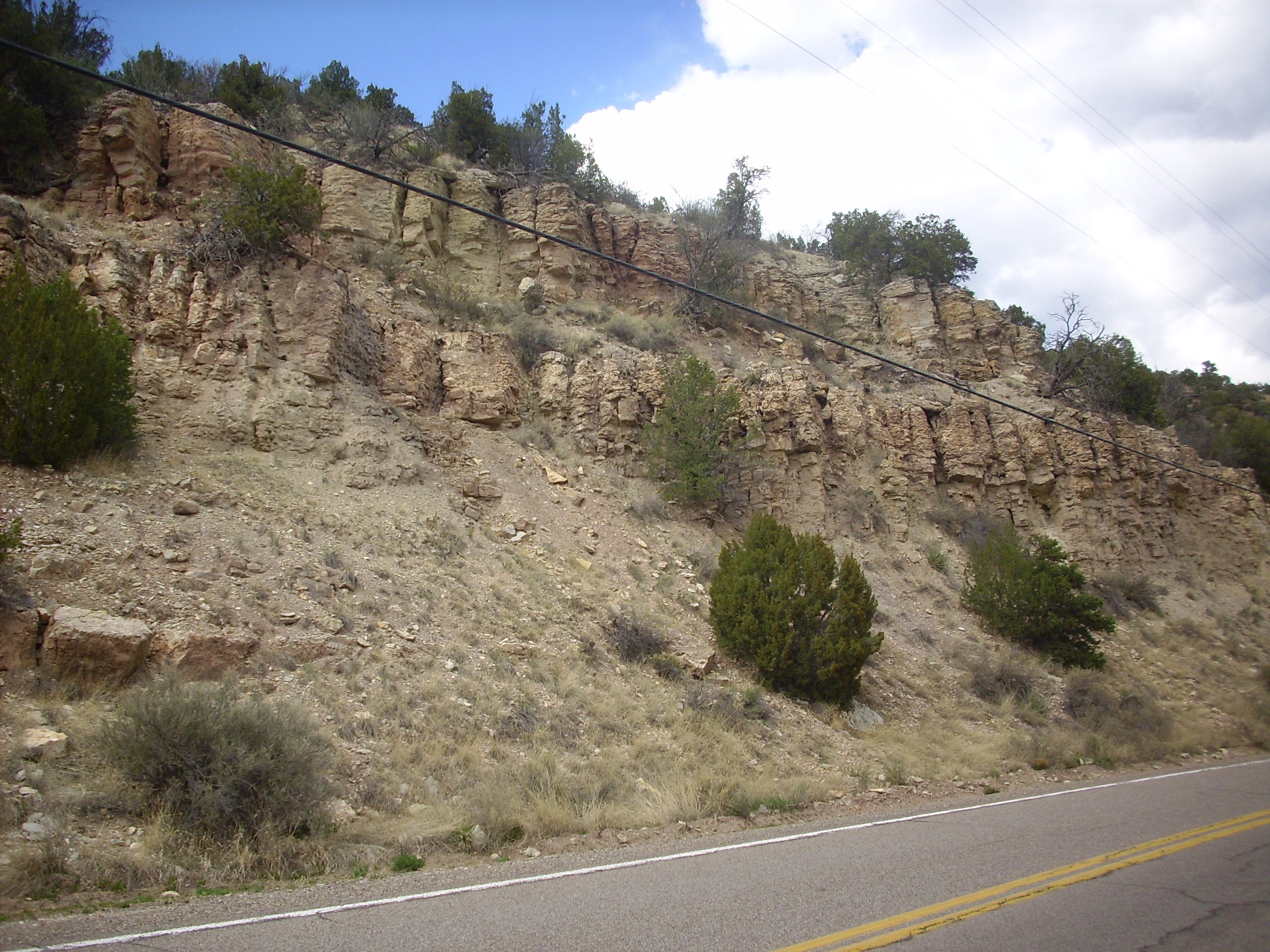
- Atrasado Formation north of Jemez Springs, New Mexico
- Type: Formation
- Unit of: Madera Group
- Sub-units: See text
- Underlies: Bursum Formation
- Overlies: Gray Mesa Formation
- Thickness: 272 m (892 ft)

Lithology
- Primary: Limestone
- Other: Sandstone, shale

Location
- Coordinates: 34.699°N 107.120°W
- Region: New Mexico
- Country: United States

Type section
- Named for: Atrasado Arroyo
- Named by: Kelley and Wood
- Year defined: 1946
- Atrasado Formation (the United States) Atrasado Formation (New Mexico)

The Atrasado Formation is a geologic formation in New Mexico. Its fossil assemblage dates the formation to the Kasimovian age of the Pennsylvanian. It was formerly known locally as the Wild Cow Formation or the Guadelupe Box Formation.

== Description ==
The formation consists primarily of marine limestone with some sandstone and shale. It is exposed in the Sandia Mountains, the Lucero Uplift (34.621°N 107.299°W), the western Jemez Mountains, and in the Manzano Mountains.

The formation has been mapped as the Wild Cow Formation in the Manzano Mountains and as the Guadelupe Box Formation in the Jemez Mountains. However, Spencer G. Lucas and coinvestigators have recommended abandoning the name Wild Cow Formation and using Atrasado Formation throughout the Madera Group. The formation is likely correlative with the Alamitos Formation in the Sangre de Cristo Mountains.

The formation is underlain by the Gray Mesa Formation, with its base defined by a sandstone interval atop an eroded limestone surface of the Gray Mesa Formation. It is further distinguished from the Gray Mesa Formation in having frequent intervals of slope-forming sandstone or shale beds between cliff-forming limestone intervals, whereas the Gray Mesa Formation is mostly massive limestone. The Atrasado Formation is overlain by the Bursum Formation or by the Abo Formation where the Bursum Formation is not present.

The formation is divided into eight members. In ascending stratigraphic order, these are the Bartolo Member, which is 66 meters (217 feet) of slope-forming shale with thin sandstone, limestone and conglomerate beds; the Amado Member, which is 9 meters (30 feet) of bedded, cherty limestone; the Tinajas Member, which is 115 meters (377 feet) of shale with interbedded limestone and sandstone; the Council Spring Member which is 23 meters (75 feet) of mostly algal limestone without chert; the Burrego Member, which is 26 meters (85 feet) of arkosic red beds and limestone; the Story Member, which is 6 meters (20 feet) of limestone; the Del Cuerto Member, which is 16 meters (52 feet) of arkosic red beds and limestone; and the Moya Member, which is 11 meters (36 feet) of bedded limestone and shale.

The lowest few meters of the Bartolo Member is often a distinctive pebbly sandstone, the Coyote Sandstone Bed.

The formation was laid down during the Ancestral Rocky Mountains orogeny, when most of New Mexico consisted of high islands surrounded by marine basins. The Burrego Member, in particular, contains both marine and continental beds, and the continental beds include paleosols (fossil soils) typical of a monsoon climate. New Mexico was then located at the western end of the Pangean tropical belt. Analysis of the paleosols suggests a carbon dioxide concentration in the atmosphere of around 400 ppm by volume at the time of deposition.

== Fossils ==
The exposures near Jemez Springs include some of the richest brachiopod fossil beds in North America. Crinoid stems and bryozoans are also part of the fossil assemblage. The Amado Member is particularly rich in brachiopods in the Manzano Mountains.

The lower part of the Atrasado Formation (Tinajas Member) contains the index fusulinid Eowaeringella indicating the beds were laid down in the lower Missourian Age. These are overlain by beds containing abundant early Triticites.

== History of investigation ==
The unit was first described as the Atrasado Member of the Madera Formation by Kelley and Wood in 1946.

The Pennsylvanian stratigraphy of New Mexico has historically been unusually complex and inconsistent, with dozens of names for groups, formations, and members. Barry Kues and Katherine Giles recommended that the name Madera Group be applied to similar exposures of shelf and marginal basin beds of Desmoinean (upper Moscovian) to early Virgilian age found from north-central and central New Mexico south along the west side of the Orogrande Basin as far as the Caballo and Robledo Mountains. Lucas and coinvestigators recommended abandoning the name Wild Cow Formation and using Atrasado Formation throughout the Madera Group.

== See also ==
- List of fossiliferous stratigraphic units in New Mexico
- Paleontology in New Mexico
