= Madera Group =

Group of geologic formations in New Mexico, United States

- Stratigraphic range: middle Pennsylvanian–late Pennsylvanian
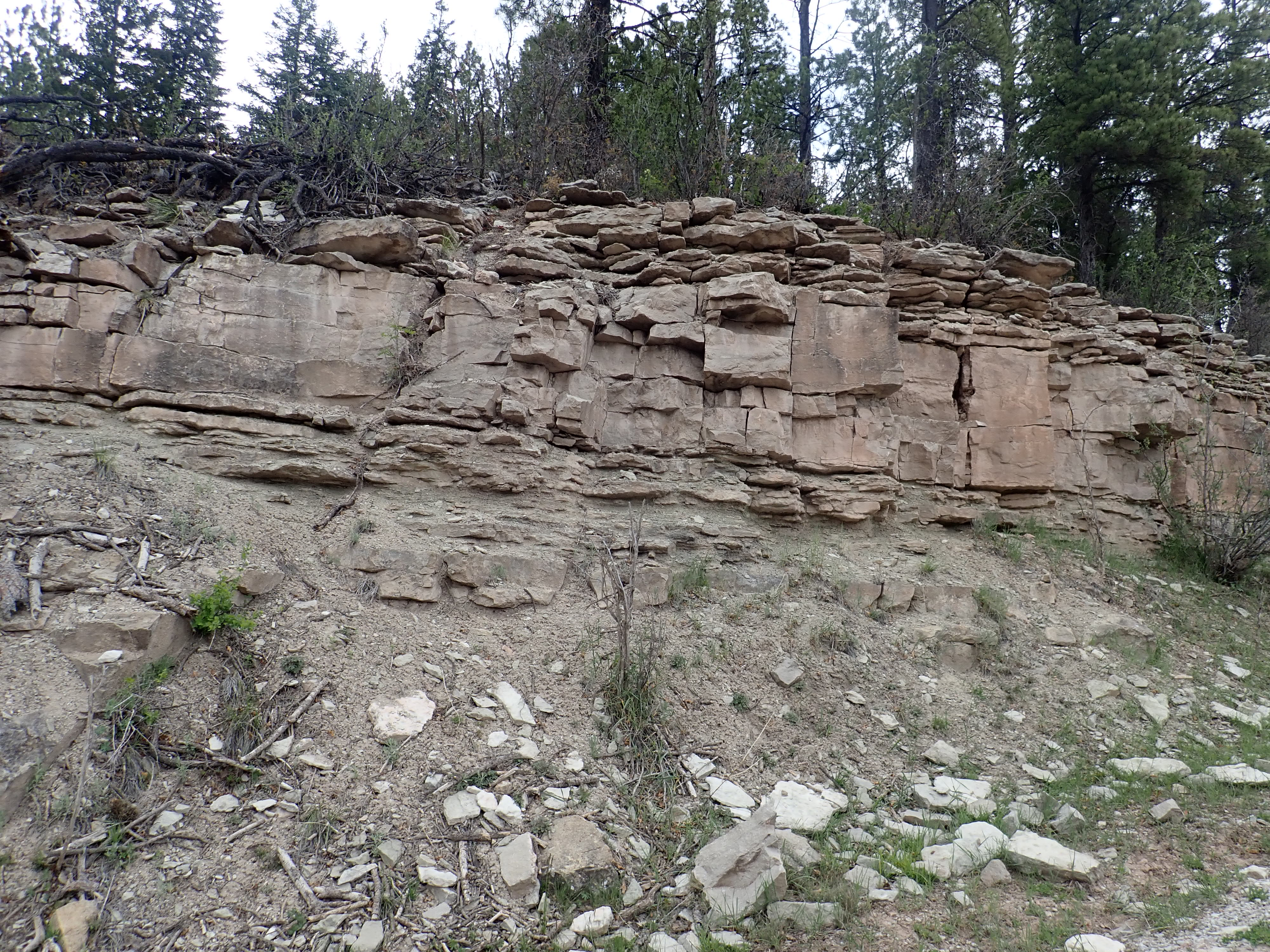
- Madera Group limestone beds in the San Pedro Mountains, New Mexico
- Type: Group
- Sub-units: Gray Mesa Formation, Atrasado Formation
- Underlies: Abo Formation, Bursum Formation
- Overlies: Sandia Formation
- Thickness: 390 m (maximum subsurface)

Lithology
- Primary: Limestone

Location
- Coordinates: 35.223°N 106.379°W
- Region: New Mexico
- Country: United States

Type section
- Named for: Town of La Madera, New Mexico
- Named by: Charles Rollin Keyes
- Year defined: 1903
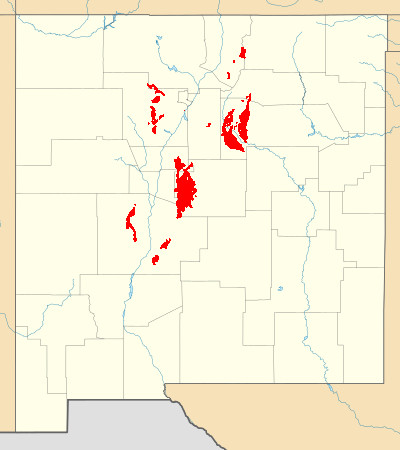
- Madera Group (New Mexico) Outcrops of Madera Group in New Mexico

The Madera Group is a group of geologic formations in northern New Mexico. Its fossil assemblage dates the formation to the middle to late Pennsylvanian period.

== Description ==
The group consists primarily of marine limestones, and it is exposed in the Sandia Mountains, the Lucero Uplift (34.621°N 107.299°W), the western Jemez Mountains, the Sangre de Cristo Mountains, and in the Manzano Mountains.

The lower section of the group tends to be a gray limestone and the upper an arkosic limestone, and these have been divided into the La Pasada Formation and Alamitos Formation in the southern Sangre de Cristo Mountains. In the Manzano Mountains, the Madera has been divided into the Los Moyos, Wild Cow, and Bursum Formations. Another proposed division in the southeastern Sangre de Cristo Mountains is into the Porvenir and Alamitos Formations.

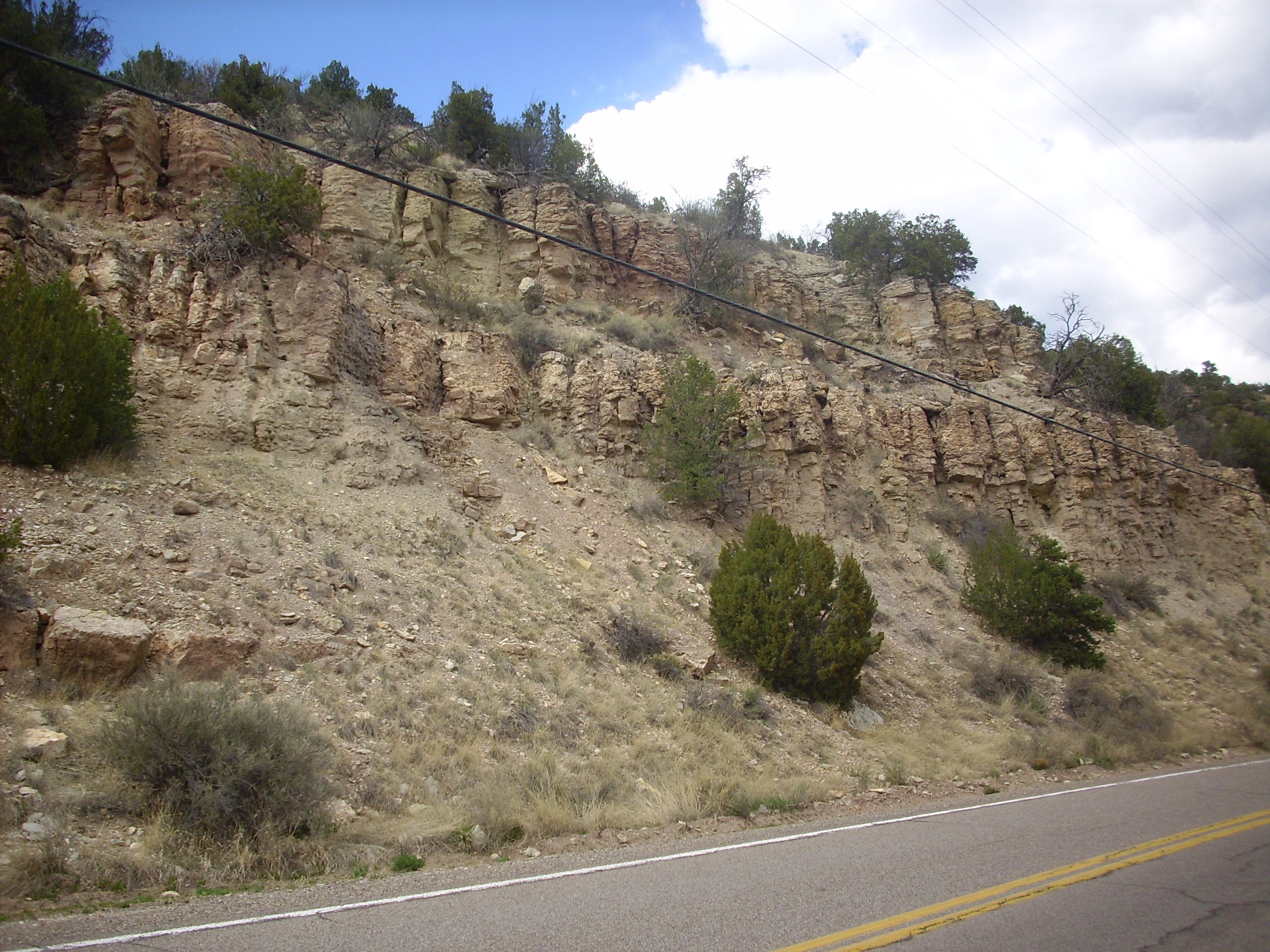
Atrasado Formation north of Jemez Springs, New Mexico

Barry Kues and Katherine Giles have recommended the division of the Madera Group into the Gray Mesa Formation and Atrasado Formation in its western and southern exposures, which extend from the Nacimiento Mountains through the Lucero Uplift to the Los Robles Mountains. For the eastern exposures of the Sandia and Manzano Mountains and Estancia Basin, they recommend division into the Los Moyos Formation and Wild Cow Formation. They recommend abandoning the name Madera Group in the Sangre de Cristo Mountains. More recently, Spencer G. Lucas and coinvestigators have recommended abandoning the names Los Moyos Formation and Wild Cow Formation and using Grey Mesa Formation and Atrasado Formation throughout the Madera Group.

The group is underlain at most locations by the Sandia Formation, with its base typically placed at the first massive marine limestone bed above the shales of the Sandia Formation. It is overlain everywhere by the Abo Formation or its equivalents, with the transition typically gradational, with the base of the Abo placed at the top of the last massive marine limestone bed below the fluvial redbeds typical of the Abo. The transitional zone between the Madera Group and the Abo Formation is sometimes assigned to the Bursum Formation, which is not included in the Madera Group.

== Fossils ==
The exposures near Jemez Springs include some of the richest brachiopod fossil beds in North America. Crinoid stems and bryozoans are also part of the fossil assemblage. The formation is also exposed in the canyon of Rio Grande del Rancho south of Talpa, New Mexico, where brachiopods, crinoids, rugose coral, and graptolite fossils can be found. The fossil assemblage dates the Madera Group to the middle to late Pennsylvanian.

== History of investigation ==
In 1903, C.R. Keyes applied the name, Madera limestone, to what he identified as upper Carboniferous beds in the Sandia Mountains. The unit was named for the town of La Madera. The name was subsequently applied to Pennsylvanian marine limestones throughout central and northern New Mexico. D.A. Myers first proposed that the unit be raised to group rank in 1973.

The Pennsylvanian stratigraphy of New Mexico has historically been unusually complex and inconsistent, with dozens of names for groups, formations, and members. Kues and Giles recommended that the name Madera Group be applied to similar exposures of shelf and marginal basin beds of Desmoinean (upper Moscovian) to early Virgilian age found from north-central and central New Mexico south along the west side of the Orogrande Basin as far as the Caballo and Robledo Mountains.

== See also ==
- List of fossiliferous stratigraphic units in New Mexico
- Paleontology in New Mexico
