= Bar B Formation =

Geologic formation in New Mexico, US

- Stratigraphic range: middle Pennsylvanian–late Pennsylvanian
- Type: Formation
- Underlies: Bursum Formation
- Overlies: Nakaye Formation
- Thickness: 339 ft (103 m)

Lithology
- Primary: Limestone, shale

Location
- Coordinates: 33.0185°N 107.2390°W
- Region: New Mexico
- Country: United States

Type section
- Named for: Barbee Draw (drainage)
- Named by: V.C. Kelley and Caswell Silver
- Year defined: 1952
- Bar B Formation (the United States) Bar B Formation (New Mexico)

The Bar B Formation is a geologic formation found the Caballo Mountains of New Mexico. It preserves fossils showing it was deposited in the middle to late Pennsylvanian.

== Description ==
The Bar B formation is mostly cyclic beds of shale and limestone, with shale making up about 80% of the formation and limestone the other 20%. Chert is present in some of the limestone. The upper 50 feet (15 m) include reddish-brown siltstone, limestone conglomerate, and calcareous siltstone. The total thickness is about 339 ft (103 m). The formation rests on the Nakaye Formation and is unconformably overlain by the Bursum Formation.

The formation likely correlates with the Panther Seep Formation in the San Andres Mountains.

== Fossils ==
The formation contains abundant bryozoan fossils.

== History of investigation ==
The formation was first defined by V.C.Kelley and Caswell Silver in 1952. Bachman and Myers criticized its definition in 1975, but it is accepted by Kues and Giles, though they restrict it to the Caballo Mountains.

== See also ==
- List of fossiliferous stratigraphic units in New Mexico
- Paleontology in New Mexico
