= Hart Mine Formation =

Geologic formation in New Mexico, USA

- Stratigraphic range: Eocene
- Type: Formation
- Underlies: Spears Group
- Overlies: Crevasse Canyon Formation
- Thickness: 320 meters (1,050 ft)

Lithology
- Primary: Siltstone
- Other: conglomerate

Location
- Coordinates: 33.874240°N 106.735864°W
- Region: New Mexico
- Country: United States

Type section
- Named for: Hart Mine (abandoned coal mine)
- Named by: Lucas and Williamson
- Year defined: 1993
- Hart Mine Formation (the United States) Hart Mine Formation (New Mexico)

The Hart Mine Formation is a geologic formation controversially defined from exposures in south-central New Mexico. It preserves fossils dating back to the Eocene epoch.

== Description ==
The formation is mostly calcareous reddish-brown siltstone, which makes up 72% of the type section. The remainder is mostly conglomerate with only minor silty mudstone. The conglomerate is primarily Paleozoic limestone with lesser amounts of granite. Total thickness is estimated at 320 meters (1,050 ft). The formation lies disconformably on Crevasse Canyon Formation and grades above into the Spears Formation.

The formation provides evidence for a pulse of Laramide deformation in New Mexico 50 million years ago.

== Fossils ==
The formation contains fossils of turtles, the lizard Glyptosaurus, the brontothere Telmatherium manteoceras, the rodent Reithroparamys huerfanensis, the insectivore Leptotomus parvus, the equid Orohippus pumilis, and the primate Notharctus tenebrosus, pointing to a Bridgerian age for the formation.

== History of investigation ==
The formation was first defined by Spencer G. Lucas and Thomas E. Williamson in 1993 and named for the Hart Mine, an abandoned coal mine. The beds were formerly assigned to the Baca Formation but show differences in lithology and appear to have been deposited in a different sedimentary basin. However, the reassignment was disputed by Cather and collaborators, who argued that the lithological distinction is not great and the basin reconstruction was still speculative. Lucas responded in turn that the Hart Mine Formation has more abundant conglomerate than the Baca Formation and argued that this makes it lithologically distinct. However, the reassignment continues to be controversial.

== See also ==
- List of fossiliferous stratigraphic units in New Mexico
- Paleontology in New Mexico
