= Caballo Mountains =

Mountain range in New Mexico, United States

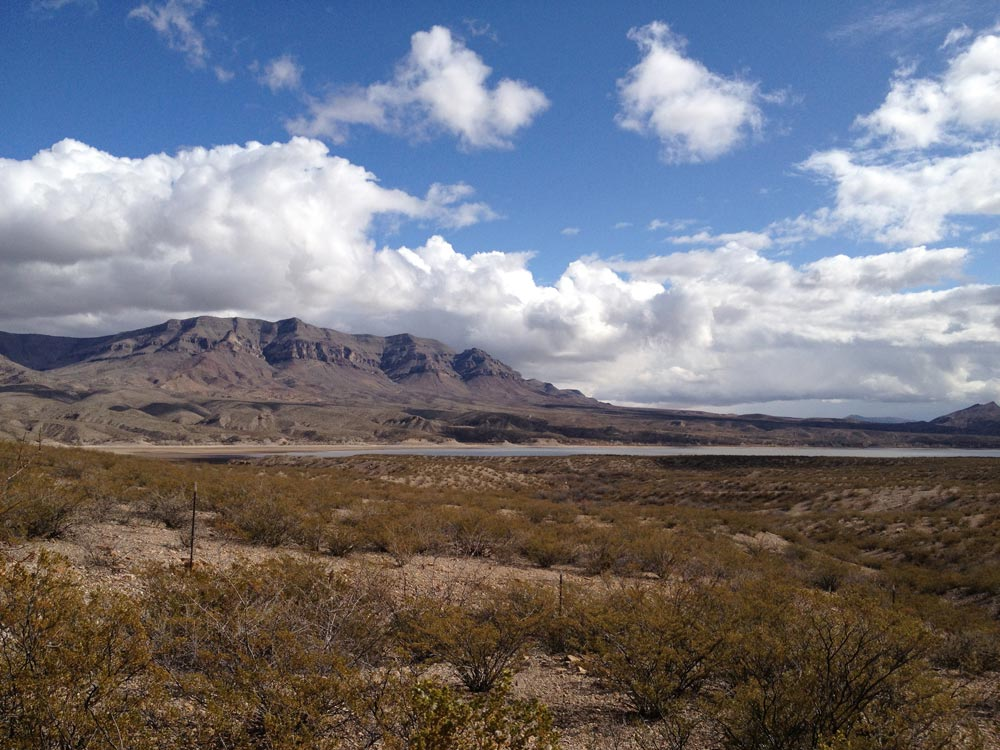

Highest point
- Coordinates: 32°57′47″N 107°13′50″W

Dimensions
- Length: 32 mi (51 km) NNW-SSE
- Width: 4 mi (6.4 km) WSW-ENE

Geography
- Location within New Mexico
- Country: United States
- State: New Mexico
- Counties: Sierra and Doña Ana
- Range coordinates: 32°57′47″N 107°13′50″W
- Borders on: Truth or Consequences, Rio Grande, Caballo Reservoir, McLeod Hills and Jornada del Muerto

The Caballo Mountains, (Spanish: "horse") are a mountain range located in Sierra and Doña Ana Counties, New Mexico, United States. The range is located east of the Rio Grande and Caballo Lake, and west of the Jornada del Muerto; the south of the range extends into northwest Doña Ana County. The nearest towns are Truth or Consequences and Hatch.

Most of the Caballo Mountains are located on land owned by the Bureau of Land Management. The mountains are unusual, and perhaps unique in New Mexico, for the relatively complete geologic history revealed by their rocks. Vehicular access to the range is by Interstate 25 from the west, by New Mexico State Road 51 from the north, and by several dirt roads from the east.

== Geography ==
The Caballo Mountains trend north and south, with a length of approximately 32 miles (50 km). The width of the range varies from 3–6 miles (5–10 km). The highest point on the range, Timber Mountain (7,565 feet), has a topographic prominence of approximately 3,400 feet.

The types, sizes, and profiles of the Caballo watersheds vary significantly according to the part of the range that they drain. No perennial streams flow through the mountains, although the course of the Rio Grande is close to the north, west, and south margins of the range. The northern part of the Caballos drains into the Rio Grande through Ash Canyon and Mescal Canyon. The confluences of those two intermittent streams are just below Elephant Butte Dam. Water falling on the precipitous west face of the range drains directly into the Rio Grande by means of numerous first order canyons with high gradients. All are ephemeral and less than 3 miles in length.

In contrast, the eastern side has only two primary drainages, each with a much lower gradient than those to the north and west. Water falling on the southern half of the east side flows into Barbee Draw. After joining another tributary near Point of Rocks to form Rincon Arroyo, this ephemeral drainage flows southward before joining the Rio Grande near Rincon, New Mexico. The length of this drainage is over 25 miles. The north portion of the east side is drained by Jornada Draw. This drainage, however, is endorheic and has no surface connection to the Rio Grande.

== Geology ==
The geological importance of the Caballo Mountains lies in the variety and scope of their exposed rocks. Geologists can assess exposed rock formations in several ways. Relative dating compares the formation's bedding location in comparison with other formations nearby. This allows not only the identification of the older and younger formations, but conclusions about unusual local conditions, such as folding, a fault displacement, or an unconformity. Absolute dating measures the presence and ratios of chemicals within the rocks to determine the number of years since they were deposited. The conditions existing when the rock was deposited can be determined by examining its type (igneous, metamorphic, or sedimentary), the orientation and size of crystals or sediments within it, and the orientation of the formation within its larger regional setting. By studying plant and animal fossils that may exist in the formation, it may be possible to determine not only its relative age, but the climate at the time of deposition.

Weathering and erosion remove any rock that is exposed at the surface of the Earth. Consequently, there are no sites where all rocks deposited at that location have been preserved. Certain sites, however, may have more complete geological histories because of differences in the timing and circumstances of rock removal. The Caballo Mountains are essentially unique in New Mexico because their section of exposed rocks begins in Precambrian time, and runs through every geological period of the Phanerozoic eon with the exceptions of the Triassic and Jurassic. This provides an unparalleled picture of the geological history of southern New Mexico.

=== Stratigraphy ===
The basement rocks of the Caballos include plutons of granite, and metamorphic amphibolite and gneiss. These rocks date from the Early to Middle Proterozoic, and are found along the base of the larger fault blocks.

Throughout the early and middle Paleozoic southern New Mexico alternated between being flooded by shallow tropical seas, and being exposed to erosion. Sedimentary deposits of early and middle Paleozoic age include:

- Bliss Formation of arkosic sandstone and siltstone (Cambrian to Ordovician).
- El Paso Formation of dolomites and limestones (Ordovician)
- Montoya Formation of dolomites and cherty dolomites (Ordovician)
- Fusselman Dolomite (Silurian)
- Percha Shale (Devonian)
- Lake Valley Formation of limestones and cherty limestones (Mississippian)

An unconformity exists above the Lake Valley Formation, and appears to include the middle Mississippian through the early Pennsylvanian periods. During the Pennsylvanian and Permian periods, a major deformation created a series of uplifts and intermontane basins. This event is often referred to as the Ancestral Rocky Mountains. Associated with this event is the Magdalena Group, which includes deposits of both marine and non-marine sources. The thickness of these strata is greater than that of all earlier Paleozoic rocks. Above the Magdalena Group is the Red House Formation of packstone and shale, the Nakaye Formation of limestone, the Bar B Formation of interbedded limestone, dolomite, shale, and conglomerate, and the red shale beds of the Abo Formation. All of those strata are Pennsylvanian in age. Above them is the Permian Yeso Formation, which consists of sandstones, siltstone-dolomites, and limestones. The Paleozoic strata are completed by the Meseta Blanca Sandstone Member.

Most of the Mesozoic rocks are missing from the Caballo geological history. A second unconformity lies above the Meseta Blanca Sandstone, and includes all of the Triassic and Jurassic periods. The next oldest rocks are of Cretaceous age and include:

- Dakota Sandstone
- Rio Salado Tongue Member of Mancos Shale
- Tres Hermanos Formation of sandstones
- Cross Tongue Member of Mancos Shale
- Gallup Sandstone
- Crevasse Canyon Formation of sandstones and mudstones
- McRae Formation of sandstones, tuff, and conglomerate

The Mesozoic rocks terminate below another unconformity. Above that is the Love Ranch Formation of conglomerate, mudstone and sandstone, which was deposited in the Paleocene to early Eocene. During the Eocene, a wave of arc volcanism was felt across southern New Mexico. In the Caballo Mountains, this can be seen in the Palm Park Formation, a thick layer of andesitic or tuffaceous mudstones, sandstones, and breccia. Next is the Bell Top Formation, which consists of rhyolite, basalt flows, and tuffaceous sandstones. In the southern part of the Caballo Mountains, there are remnants of a region wide sheet of flood basalts and andesite, which was laid during the Oligocene. Of similar age is the Thurman Formation of white sandstone. The Santa Fe Group (geology) was deposited during the Miocene and Pliocene. This thick layer consists of the Hayner Ranch Formation (conglomerate, sandstone and shale), the Rincon Valley Formation (conglomerate, sandstone, and mudstone), the Selden basalts, and the Camp Rice/Palomas Formations (ash fall deposits, basalts, and pumice-clast conglomerates). Quaternary and Holocene deposits consist of alluvium. On the west side of the range along the Rio Grande, the alluvial fill consists of unconsolidated fluvial deposits of boulders, cobble, and gravel. In the closed basin on the east side of the range, there are relatively few fluvial deposits. Instead, the sediment includes a flat, thin veneer of sand and gravel.

=== Tectonics ===
The Rio Grande Rift is a continental rift zone, which extends approximately 680 miles (~1,100 km) from central Colorado in the north to the state of Chihuahua, Mexico in the south. It is the product of extensional tectonic (or divergent) forces that formed a series of basins between the Colorado Plateau and the North American craton Thin continental crust, normal fault block topography, high regional elevation, and volcanism is found over the course of the rift.

The following five timelines show the geologic time scale to scale. The first shows the entire time from the formation of Earth to the present, but this gives little space for the most recent eon. The second timeline shows an expanded view of the most recent eon. In a similar way, the most recent era is expanded in the third timeline, the most recent period is expanded in the fourth timeline, and the most recent epoch is expanded in the fifth timeline.

(Horizontal scale is millions of years for the above timelines; thousands of years for the timeline below)

The history of movement along the rift has been divided into three separate stages: an initial stage during the late Eocene to early Oligocene, a second stage during the late Oligocene to late Miocene, and a third stage beginning in the late Miocene or early Pliocene and continuing to the recent past. Activity in the vicinity of the Caballos during the first stage included explosive rhyolitic eruptions from cauldrons located to the northwest, west, and southeast. The earliest eruptions took place in the Dona Ana Mountains and Organ Mountains between 36.2 and 35.4 Ma. The Emory cauldron, located in the Black Range, was active approximately 34.9 Ma. What is now the San Mateo Mountains (Socorro County) contained at least two cauldrons, the Nogal Canyon cauldron (28.6 Ma) and the Mount Withington cauldron (27.4 Ma). Local subsiding appears to have begun around 34.9 Ma. The Caballo Mountains began to rise in the late Oligocene, and throughout the Miocene. Approximately 9.6 Ma, the eruption of basalts near Fort Selden signaled the renewal of crustal extension and volcanism in the southern part of the rift. Activity along both older and new faults increased the number, but decreased the width of basins along this portion of the rift.

=== Economic Geology ===
The Caballo Mountains have few large intrusives, and as a result, hydrothermal mineralization is not extensive. Nevertheless, prospecting in the range began in about 1883, and several mines opened in the first decade of the 20th century. Production has been concentrated in three areas:

- Northern Red Hills - fluorspar
- Palomas Gap - copper, vanadium, lead, and fluorspar
- Southern Caballos - gold, fluorspar, barite, and manganese

It has been estimated that the total value of copper, silver, gold, and lead produced from the Caballos before 1952 did not exceed $200,000. At present, more fluorspar is produced than any other mineral. The largest fluorspar deposits are found in Precambrian granite, and jasperized Fusselman Dolomite.

== Ecology ==
As is the case with many other mountain ranges in southern New Mexico, the Caballo Mountains impose extreme demands on ecological communities. With the exception of the intermittent streams in the northern part of the range, and the area close to the Rio Grande, there is very little permanent water. Precipitation quickly evaporates, runs off, or soaks into the ground, leaving little for plants or animals. Consequently, water management is a critical factor for both plants and animals.

Soils on the mountains are generally rocky and thin.

Plant communities can be generally characterized as Chihuahuan desert scrublands, creosotebush desert, and desert grasslands. Dominant shrub species include creosote bush (Larrea tridentata), honey mesquite (Prosopis glandulosa), soaptree yucca (Yucca elata), and four winged saltbush (Atriplex canescens). Common grasses include black grama (Bouteloua eriopoda), blue grama (Bouteloua gracilis), sideoats grama (Bouteloua curtipendula), and alkali sacaton (Sporobolus airoides).

The most common mammalian predators are mountain lions (Felis concolor) and coyotes (Canis latrans). Other common mammals are Black-tailed jackrabbit (Lepus californicus), desert cottontail, (Sylvilagus auduboni) and kangaroo rats (Dipodomys merriami and Dipodomys spectabilis).

Common birds of prey include golden eagles (Aquila chrysaetos), Swainson's hawk (Buteo swainsoni), Northern harrier (Circus cyaneus), and burrowing owl (Athene cunicularia). Other birds include roadrunner (Geococcyx californianus), quail (Callipepla gambelii and Callipepla squamata), doves (Zenaida macroura and Zenaida asiatica).

Common reptiles include Collared lizards (Crotaphytus collaris), Roundtail Horned Lizard (Phrynosoma modestum), Striped whipsnake (Masticophis taeniatus), and Western diamondback rattlesnake (Crotalus atrox).

== Other sources ==
- Allred, Kelly W. (1997). A Field Guide to the Grasses of New Mexico (2d Ed.). Las Cruces: New Mexico State University.
- Carter, Jack L. (1997). Trees and Shrubs of New Mexico. Mimbres Publishing.
- Degenhardt, William G.; et al. (1996). Amphibians and Reptiles of New Mexico. Albuquerque: University of New Mexico Press.
- Dick-Peddie, William A. (2000). New Mexico Vegetation Past, Present, and Future. Albuquerque: University of New Mexico Press.
- Findley, James S. (1987). The Natural History of New Mexico Mammals. Albuquerque: University of New Mexico Press.
- Hawley, J.W. (1978). Guidebook to Rio Grande rift in New Mexico and Colorado. New Mexico Bureau of Mines and Mineral Resources. pp. 55-.
- Julyan, Bob (1998). New Mexico's Wilderness Areas: The Complete Guide. Westcliffe Publishers. p. 271.
- Mack, Greg J. (1997). The Geology of Southern New Mexico. Albuquerque: University of New Mexico Press.
- Seager, William R.; Mack, Greg H. (2003). Geology of the Caballo Mountains, New Mexico. Memoir. Vol. 49. Socorro: New Mexico Bureau of Geology and Mineral Resources. ISBN 978-1-883905-15-6.
- Sibley, David A. (2000). The Sibley Guide to Birds. New York: Alfred A. Knopf.
- The Roads of New Mexico. Shearer Publishing. 1998. p. 91.
- New Mexico Road and Recreation Atlas (3d ed.). Benchmark Maps. 1999. pp. 47–48.
