= Red House Formation =

Geologic formation in New Mexico, US

- Stratigraphic range: Bashkirian–Moscovian
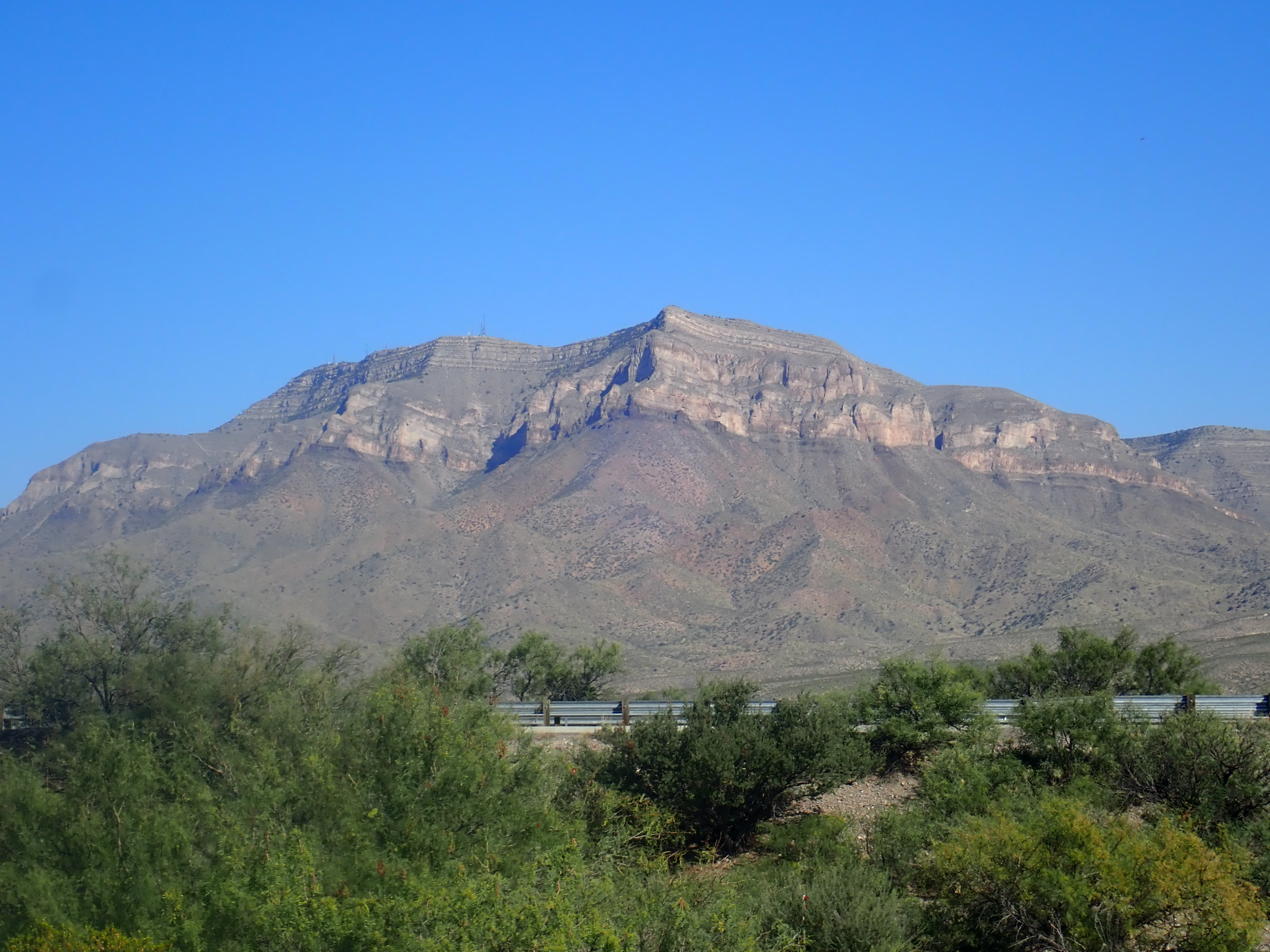
- Red House Formation is the darker band forming a slight slope immediately below the limestone ledges capping Timber Mountain, New Mexico, USA.
- Type: Formation
- Underlies: Nakaye Formation
- Overlies: Lake Valley Limestone, Percha Shale
- Thickness: 500 ft (150 m)

Lithology
- Primary: Limestone
- Other: Shale, claystone

Location
- Coordinates: 33.018265°N 107.238855°W
- Region: New Mexico
- Country: United States

Type section
- Named for: Red House Mountain
- Named by: V.C. Kelley and Caswell Silver
- Year defined: 1952
- Red House Formation (the United States) Red House Formation (New Mexico)

The Red House Formation is a geologic formation found in the Caballo Mountains in New Mexico. It preserves fossils dating back to the middle to late Pennsylvanian.

== Description ==
The formation consists mostly of thinly bedded dark gray limestone and shale or claystone containing limestone nodules and lenses. Some massive cherty limestone beds are locally present. It rests unconformably on the Lake Valley Limestone or Percha Shale, with a thin sandstone bed at its base. Thickness is about 500 feet (150 m). It is overlain by the Nakaye Formation.

== Fossils ==
Many of the beds are abundantly fossiliferous. The formation dates from the late Morrowan (Bashkirian) to the early Atokan (Moscovian).

== History of investigation ==
The formation was first described by V.C. Kelley and Caswell Silver in 1952 and assigned to the now-obsolete Magdalena Group. G.O. Bachman and D.A. Myers criticized its definition in 1975, but it is accepted by Barry Kues and Katherine Giles. In 2016, Lucas and coinvestigators recommended that the local names Green Canyon Group, Arrey Formation, Apodaca Formation, Mud Springs Group, Fra Cristobal Formation, and Chuchillo Negro Formation be abandoned in favor of the Red House Formation.

== See also ==
- List of fossiliferous stratigraphic units in New Mexico
- Paleontology in New Mexico
