= List of fossiliferous stratigraphic units in New Mexico =

This article contains a list of fossil-bearing stratigraphic units in the state of New Mexico.

== Sites ==
Group or Formation	Period	Notes
Abiquiu Formation	Neogene	
Abo Formation	Permian	
Abo Group/Cutler Formation	Permian, Carboniferous	
Alamitos Formation	Carboniferous	
Aleman Formation	Ordovician	
Armendaris Group/Elephant Butte Formation	Carboniferous	
Armendaris Group/Garcia Formation	Carboniferous	
Armendaris Group/Whiskey Canyon Limestone	Carboniferous	
Arroyo Penasco Group	Mississippian	
Arroyo del Agua Formation	Permian	
Atarque Sandstone	Cretaceous	
Atrasado Formation	Pennsylvanian	
Baca Formation	Paleogene	
Bar B Formation	Carboniferous	
Bell Canyon Formation	Permian	
Bolander Formation	Carboniferous	
Bone Spring Formation	Permian	
Buda Limestone	Cretaceous	
Bursum Formation	Carboniferous	
Caballero Formation	Carboniferous	
Camp Rice Formation	Pliocene-Pleistocene	
Capitan Formation	Permian	
Carthage Formation	Cretaceous	
Chamita Formation	Neogene	
Cherry Canyon Formation	Permian	
Chinle Formation	Triassic	
Chinle Group/Bluewater Creek Formation	Triassic	
Chinle Group/Bull Canyon Formation	Triassic	
Chinle Group/Garita Creek Formation	Triassic	
Chinle Group/Pedro Arroyo Formation	Triassic	
Chinle Group/Petrified Forest Member	Triassic	
Chinle Group/Redonda Formation	Triassic	
Chinle Group/Salitral Formation	Triassic	
Chinle Group/San Pedro Arroyo Formation	Triassic	
Chinle Group/Santa Rosa Formation	Triassic	
Chinle Group/Sheep Pen Sandstone	Triassic	
Chinle Group/Sloan Canyon Formation	Triassic	
Chinle Group/Trujillo Formation	Triassic	
Colorado Group/Carlile Shale	Cretaceous	
Colorado Group/Niobrara Formation	Cretaceous	
Contadero Formation	Devonian	
Crevasse Canyon Formation	Cretaceous	
Cub Mountain Formation	Paleogene	
Cutter Dolomite	Ordovician	
Dakota Formation	Cretaceous	
Dakota Formation	Cretaceous	
Dakota Sandstone	Cretaceous	
Dakota Group/Mesa Rica Sandstone	Cretaceous	
Dakota Group/Pajarito Formation	Cretaceous	
Dalton Sandstone	Cretaceous	
Dawson Arkose	Paleogene	
Del Norte Formation	Cretaceous	
Diamond Trail Formation	Paleogene	
Dockum Formation	Triassic	
Dockum Group/Bull Canyon Formation	Triassic	
Edith Formation	United States	
El Cobre Canyon Formation	Pennsylvanian to Permian	
El Paso Group/Cook Formation	Ordovician	
El Paso Group/Cooks Formation	Ordovician	
El Paso Group/Florida Formation	Ordovician	
El Paso Group/José Formation	Ordovician	
El Paso Group/Mud Springs Formation	Ordovician	
El Paso Group/Mud Springs Mountain Formation	Ordovician	
El Paso Group/Padre Formation	Ordovician	
El Paso Group/Scenic Drive Formation	Ordovician	
El Paso Group/Sierrite Formation	Ordovician	
El Paso Group/Victorio Formation	Ordovician	
Finlay Formation	Cretaceous	
Fite Ranch Sandstone	Cretaceous	
Flechado Formation	Carboniferous	
Fort Union Formation	Paleogene	
Fruitland Formation	Cretaceous	
Galisteo Formation	Paleogene	
Garita Creek Formation	Triassic	
Gila Formation	Neogene	
Gila Conglomerate Formation	Pliocene – Pleistocene	
Gray Mesa Formation	Pennsylvanian	
Green Canyon Group/Apodaca Formation	Carboniferous	
Green Canyon Group/Arrey Formation	Carboniferous	
Greenhorn Limestone	Cretaceous	
Gym Formation	Permian	
Hart Mine Formation	Paleogene	
Holder Formation	Carboniferous	
Hueco Formation	Permian	
Kelly Limestone	Carboniferous	
Kirtland Formation	Cretaceous	
La Pasada Formation	Carboniferous	
Laborcita Formation	Permian	
Lake Valley Formation	Carboniferous	
Lewis Shale	Cretaceous	
Madera Formation	Permian, Carboniferous	
Madera Group/Wild Cow Formation	Carboniferous	
Mancos Shale	Cretaceous	
Mancos Group/Gullup Formation	Cretaceous	
Manzano Formation	Permian	
McRae Formation	Cretaceous	
Menefee Formation	Cretaceous	
Mesaverde Formation	Cretaceous	
Mesaverde Group/Crevasse Canyon Formation	Cretaceous	
Mesaverde Group/Menefee Formation	Cretaceous	
Mesilla Valley Formation	Cretaceous	
Mesilla Valley Shale	Cretaceous	
Moenkopi Formation	Triassic	
Mojado Formation	Cretaceous	
Montoya Group/Aleman Formation	Ordovician	
Montoya Group/Cutter Formation	Ordovician	
Montoya Group/Second Value Formation	Ordovician	
Moreno Hill Formation	Cretaceous	
Morrison Formation	Jurassic	
Mud Springs Group/Cuchillo Negro Formation	Carboniferous	
Mud Springs Group/Fra Cristobal Formation	Carboniferous	
Muleros Formation	Cretaceous	
Nacimiento Formation	Paleogene, Cretaceous	
Niobrara Formation	Cretaceous	
Ojo Alamo Formation	Cretaceous	
Onate Formation	Devonian	
Osha Canyon Formation	Bashkirian	
Palm Peak Formation	Paleogene	
Palomas Formation	Neogene	
Panther Seep Formation	Carboniferous	
Percha Shale	Devonian	
Pictured Cliffs Sandstone	Cretaceous	
Pierre Shale	Cretaceous	
Point Lookout Formation	Cretaceous	
Popotosa Formation	Neogene	
Puerco Formation	Paleogene	
Raton Formation	Paleogene, Cretaceous	
Red Tanks Formation	Pennsylvanian	
Rincon Valley Formation	Neogene	
Ringbone Formation	Cretaceous	
Rubio Peak Formation	Paleogene	
San Andres Formation	Permian	
San Jose Formation	Paleogene	
Sandia Formation	Pennsylvanian	
Sandstone of Inman Ranch	Paleogene	
Sangre de Cristo Formation	Permian	
Santa Fe Formation	Neogene	
Santa Fe Formation	Neogene	
Santa Rosa Formation	Triassic	
Second Value Dolomite	Ordovician	
Seven Rivers Formation	Permian	
Shalem Colony Formation	Permian	
Sierra Ladrones Formation	Neogene	
Sloan Canyon Formation	Triassic	
Sly Gap Formation	Devonian	
Smeltertown Formation	Cretaceous	
Summerville Formation	Jurassic	
Tansill Formation	Permian	
Tererro Formation	Carboniferous	
Tesuque Formation	Neogene	
Throughgood Formation	Devonian	
Todilto Formation	Jurassic	
Travesser Formation	Triassic	
Tucumcari Formation	Cretaceous	
Wasatch Formation	Paleogene	
Wild Cow Formation	Carboniferous	
Yates Formation	Permian	
Yeso Formation	Permian	
Zia Formation	Neogene	

== See also ==
- Paleontology in New Mexico
