= San Pedro Arroyo Formation =

Geologic formation in New Mexico

- Stratigraphic range: late Triassic
- Type: Formation
- Unit of: Chinle Group
- Sub-units: Ojo Huelos Member
- Underlies: Morrison Formation
- Overlies: Santa Rosa Formation
- Thickness: 123 meters (404 ft)

Lithology
- Primary: Mudstone, sandstone
- Other: Conglomerate, siltstone, limestone

Location
- Coordinates: 33.893°N 106.750°W
- Region: New Mexico
- Country: United States

Type section
- Named for: San Pedro Arroyo
- Named by: Spencer G. Lucas
- Year defined: 1991
- San Pedro Arroyo Formation (the United States) San Pedro Arroyo Formation (New Mexico)

The San Pedro Arroyo Formation is a geologic formation in south-central New Mexico. It preserves fossils dating back to the late Triassic period.

== Description ==
The formation consists of variegated bentonitic mudstone, sandstone, conglomerate, siltstone, and minor limestone, with a total thickness of 123 meters (404 ft). The sandstones are purple to red in color and are crossbedded, laminar, ripple laminated and micaceous. They are interbedded with conglomerates composed of mudstone and calcrete clasts. The formation rests on the Santa Rosa Formation and underlies either the Morrison Formation or, where that is not present, the Mesa Rica Formation or Dakota Group.

A set of limestone beds near the base of the formation have been designated the Ojo Huelos Member. This consists of brown-weathering limestone beds a few meters thick, interbedded with meter-thick yellowish to greenish mudstone.

== History of investigation ==
The formation was defined by Lucas et al. in 1991 to resolve an inconsistency in the stratigraphy of south-central New Mexico. Previous work had separated the Shinarump Formation from the Chinle Formation, but the Shinarump is a member of the Chinle Formation on the Colorado Plateau. Lucas further rationalized the stratigraphy by promoting the Chinle to group rank in New Mexico in 1993. However, other New Mexico stratigraphers have criticized the formation as a junior synonym for the Cooper Canyon Formation.

== Fossils ==
Fossils of amphibians and phytosaurs have been found in the formation.

== See also ==
- List of fossiliferous stratigraphic units in New Mexico
- Paleontology in New Mexico
