= Abo Formation =

Geological formation in New Mexico

- Stratigraphic range: middle Wolfcampian to early Leonardian; ~290–275 Ma
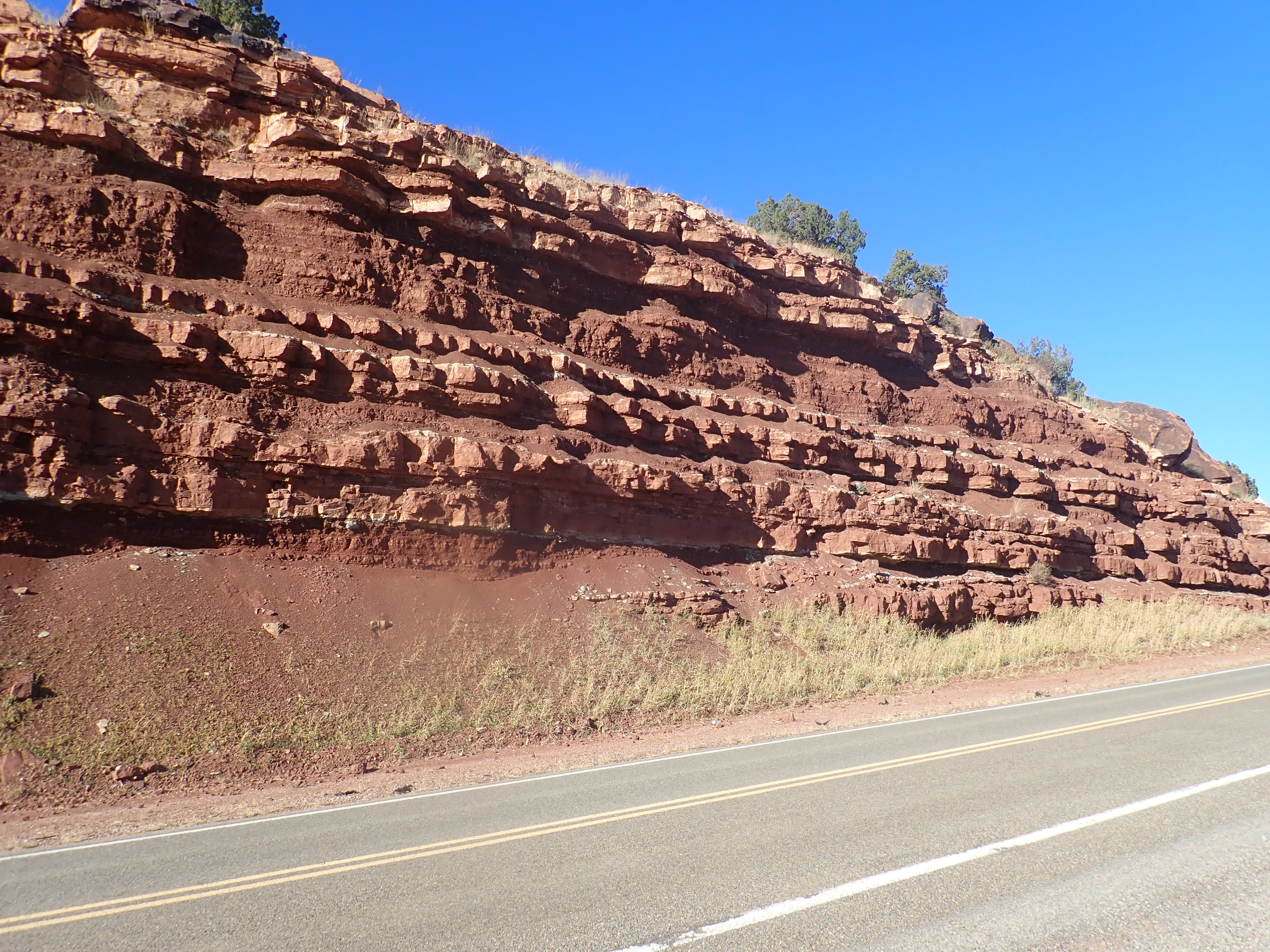
- Abo Formation at its type section in Abo Pass, New Mexico, USA. This is the Cañon de Espinoso Member.
- Type: Formation
- Unit of: Group
- Underlies: Yeso Group
- Overlies: Bursum Formation of the Madera Group
- Thickness: 280 m (920 ft) at type section

Lithology
- Primary: Mudstone
- Other: Sandstone

Location
- Coordinates: 34.437°N 106.394°W
- Region: New Mexico
- Country: United States

Type section
- Named for: Abo Canyon
- Named by: W.T. Lee and G.H. Girty (1909)
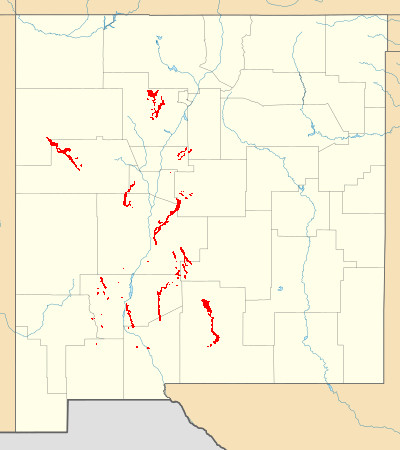
- Abo Formation (New Mexico) Exposures of Abo Formation in New Mexico

The Abo Formation is a geologic formation in New Mexico. It contains fossils characteristic of the Cisuralian epoch of the Permian period.

== Description ==
The Abo Formation consists of fluvial redbed mudstones and sandstones, including river channel deposits in its lower beds (Scholle Member) and distinctive sandstone sheets in its upper beds (Cañon de Espinoso Member.) Its depositional environment was typical of the "wet red beds" of tropical Pangaea. It is extensively exposed in the mountains and other uplifts bordering the Rio Grande Rift, with a thickness of 280 meters (920 feet) at the type section. It is also present in the subsurface in the Raton Basin.

The base of the Abo is gradational with the Madera Group, and is usually placed at the first massive marine limestone bed below the fluvial sediments of the Abo. It is overlain by the Yeso Formation, with the base of the Yeso placed at the first massive sandstone bed showing frosted grains and other eolian features. The transition zone between the Madera Group and the Abo Formation is distinctive enough in many locations that it is broken out into its own formation, the Bursum Formation.

Sandstone in the exposures towards the north, at Abo Pass and in the Jemez Mountains, tends to be arkosic, with detrital feldspars dominated by potassium feldspar including microcline. The feldspar is locally albitized, possibly by brines in evaporite basins or due to high heat flow in the crust. Granitic rock fragments are much more common than metamorphic. Cementing is usually by calcite, but quartz cementing is often present. Carbonate grains are likely reworked caliche. The formation fines to the south. The composition and southward fining indicate a granitic source to the north.

The Abo Formation was deposited in a time of rapid global warming. Carbon and oxygen isotope ratios in caliches within the formation indicate a rise in temperature from 15-30 °C during the eighteen million years in which the formation was deposited. This was accompanied by increased aridity. Deposition took place on a low-gradient, broad, well-oxidized alluvial plain in which rivers flowed to the Hueco seaway in southern New Mexico. There are indications in the strata of strong seasonality typical of the megamonsoonal climate of early Permian Pangaea.

The Abo transitions seamlessly to the Cutler Formation in the northern Jemez Mountains. With both names deeply entrenched in the geological literature, the convention is to use the name "Cutler Formation" north of 36 degrees north latitude and "Abo Formation" south of that latitude.

Paleontological data and regional correlations suggest that the age of the Abo Formation is middle Wolfcampian to early Leonardian.

=== Members ===
The Abo Formation is divided into the lower Scholle Member and the upper Cañon de Espinoso Member.

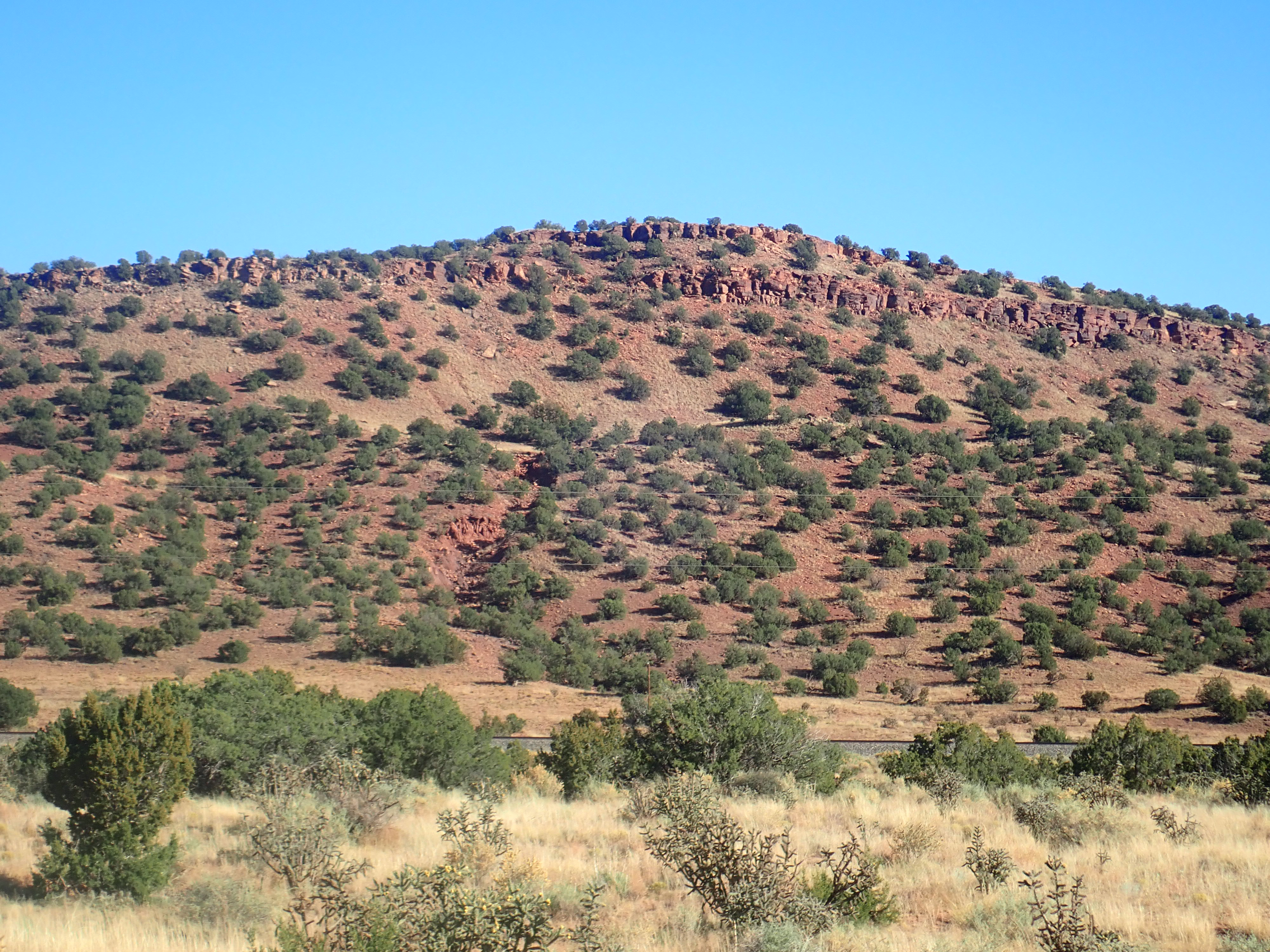
Scholle Member of the Abo Formation, Abo Pass, New Mexico, USA

The Scholle Member is dominated by mudstone (87% of the type section), with some trough-crossbedded, coarse-grained, conglomeratic sandstones (11% of the type section) interpreted as channel deposits. The remaining 2% is calcrete ledges. The member is 140 meters (460 feet) thick at the type section and is a slope-forming member. It reflect relatively rapid tectonic subsidence.

The Cañon de Espinoso Member is 170 meters (560 feet) thick at the type section, of which 70% is mudstone, 21% is thin ledges of laminated climbing-rippled sandstone, and 9% is siltstone beds. The sandstones form distinctive sheet-like bodies. This member was deposited as tectonic subsidence slowed, with an episodically stable base level.

== Fossils ==
The formation is notable for its trace fossils, which include rhizoliths, arthropod feeding and locomotion traces, and tetrapod trackways. A tracksite has been identified at Abo Pass which is dominated by Amphisauropus tracks, but also shows tracks of Dromopus, Dimetropus, Batrachichnus, Hyloidichnus, Gilmoreichnus, and Varanopus. Tracks are also found in the Lucero uplift in the Cañon de Espinoso Member that include Amphisauropus, Ichniotherium, Hyloidichnus, and Dromopus.

The formation has also produced plant, bivalve, conchostracan and vertebrate fossils in locations such as the Spanish Queen mine near Jemez Springs, which date it to the Wolfcampian (lower Permian period). Plant fossils found in the Abo Formation are mostly conifers and show two distinct paleofloras. The first, associated with red siltstone, are of low diversity and are dominated either by conifers or the peltasterm Supaia. The second paleoflora is characteristic of green shale and siltstone and is more diverse, with a variety of wetland plants, though still dominated by conifers.

One green shale site in the Caballo Mountains, interpreted as an estuarine facies of the Abo Formation, contains gastropods and diverse bivalves, including euryhaline pectins and myalinids. The Scholle Member yields most of the vertebrate fossils of the Abo Formation, typically a pelycosaur-dominated assemblage that includes lungfishes, palaeoniscoids, temnospondyl and lepospondyl amphibians, and diadectomorphs.

A bed of the formation northeast of Soccoro has the rare pseudofossil Astropolithon. This is not actually a product of living organisms, but is an unusual sedimentary structure formed by outgassing from sediments bound together by microbial mats.

== Vertebrate paleofauna ==
The following vertebrates have been reported from the Abo Formation. LVF means Land Vertebrate Faunachron the creature is assigned to based off locality.

=== Synapsida ===
Genus	Species	LVF	Notes
Edaphosaurus	E.sp.	Upper Wolfcampian	Abo specimens similar in size to E.boanerges.
Dimetrodon	D.cf.limbatus D. occidentalis	Upper Wolfcampian Middle Wolfcampian	The largest Dimetrodon specimens in New Mexico. A mid-sized Dimetrodon species.
Sphenacodon	S.ferox S.ferocior	Middle-Upper Wolfcampian Middle Wolfcampian	Smallest of the Sphenacodon species. Largest of the Sphenacodon species.
Ophiacodon	O.sp.	Middle-Upper Wolfcampian	From an indeterminate species of Ophiacodon.

=== Reptiliomorpha ===
Genus	Species	LVF	Notes
Diadectes	D.sp.	Middle-Upper Wolfcampian	From an indeterminate species of Diadectes.

=== Lepospondyli ===
Genus	Species	LVF	Notes
Diplocaulus	D.sp.	Middle-Upper Wolfcampian	Various specimens of Diplocaulus have been recovered.

=== Amphibia ===
Genus	Species	LVF	Notes
Eryops	E.sp.	Middle-Upper Wolfcampian	A large temnospondyl.
Trimerorhachis	T.sp. T.sandovalensis	Upper Wolfcampian Middle Wolfcampian	An aquatic dvinosaur.
Zatrachys	Z.sp.	Middle Wolfcampian	A terrestrial armored temnospondyl.
Platyhystrix	P.rugosus.	Middle-Upper Wolfcampian	A sail backed temnospondyl.

=== Sarcopterygia ===
Genus	Species	LVF	Notes
Gnathorhiza	G.bothrotetra	Middle Wolfcampian	A lungfish.

=== Chondrichthyes ===
Genus	Species	LVF	Notes
Orthacanthus	O.sp.	Upper Wolfcampian	A large spiny finned shark relative.
Xenacanthus	X.sp.	Middle-Upper Wolfcampian	A small spiny finned shark relative.

== Economic geology ==
The Abo Formation was mined for copper at the Spanish Queen Mine in the Jemez Springs area. The ore was discovered in 1575, but production had ceased by 1940. Copper was also mined in the Scholle district, particularly from the Abo and Copper Girl mines, beginning likely in the Spanish era, ca. 1629. Modern prospectors rediscovered the deposits in 1902 and mining from 1915 to 1961 produced about a quarter million dollars of copper and other metals. Remaining copper deposits in the Abo are uneconomical to mine at 2015 prices. Copper deposits in the Abo are characterized as stratabound sedimentary-copper deposit, largely taking the form of copper oxides, chalcopyrite, and chalcocite. They were likely produced when oxidizing waters enriched in chloride and carbonate from Paleozoic beds leached copper from Proterozoic source rock, then precipitated the copper in more reduced aquifers containing hydrogen sulfide.

Carbon dioxide was produced from subsurface Abo Formation beds in the Des Moines, New Mexico field from 1952 to 1966. Isotope studies suggest the carbon dioxide originated in the Earth's mantle and the Abo Formation is merely a reservoir rock.

== History of investigation ==
The formation was first designated as the Abo sandstone of the Manzano Group by W.T. Lee and G.H Girty in 1909, who named it for Abo Canyon in the southern Manzano Mountains. In 1943, C.E. Needham and R.L. Bates defined a type section that excluded the basal marine limestone beds, and, finding that the unit was more shale than sandstone, redesignated it the Abo Formation.

In 1946, R.H. Wiltpolt and coinvestigators removed the upper eolian sandstone beds from the Abo Formation, reassigning them to the Meseta Blanca sandstone member of the Yeso Formation.

In 2005, Spencer G. Lucas and coinvestigators divided the Abo into two members, the lower Scholle Member and the upper Cañon de Espinoso Member.

== See also ==
- List of fossiliferous stratigraphic units in New Mexico
- Paleontology in New Mexico
