= Gallup Sandstone =

Geologic formation in the Gallup-Zuni basin of New Mexico

- Stratigraphic range: Turonian – Coniacian
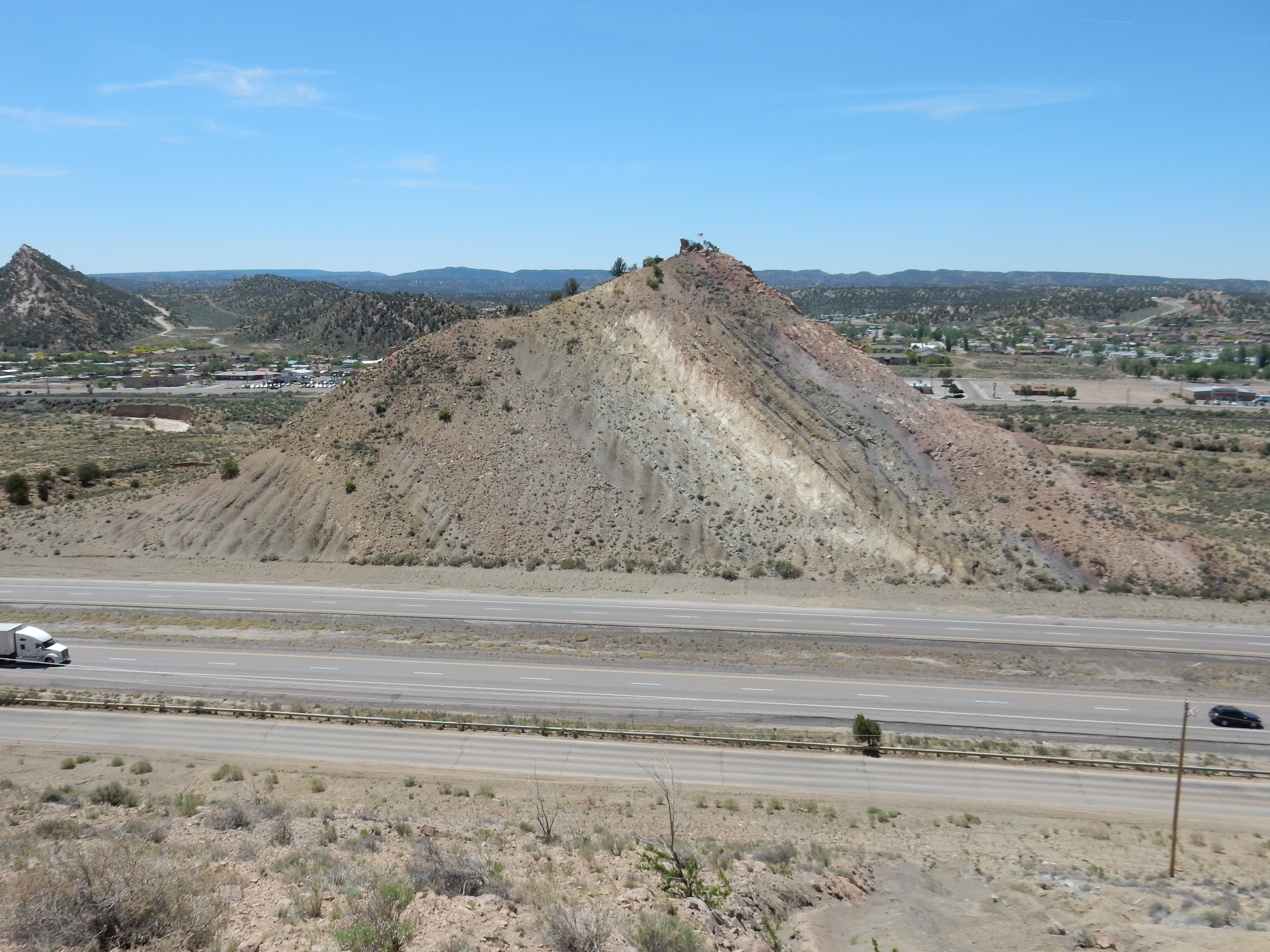
- Gallup Sandstone in the Nutria hogback east of Gallup, New Mexico, US, near its principal reference section
- Type: Formation
- Unit of: Mesaverde Group
- Underlies: Crevasse Canyon Formation
- Overlies: Mancos Shale
- Thickness: 71 meters (233 ft)

Lithology
- Primary: Sandstone
- Other: Shale, siltstone

Location
- Coordinates: 35.532170°N 108.691030°W
- Region: New Mexico
- Country: United States

Type section
- Named for: Gallup, New Mexico
- Named by: J.D. Sears
- Year defined: 1925
- Gallup Sandstone (the United States) Gallup Sandstone (New Mexico)

The Gallup Sandstone is a geologic formation in the Gallup-Zuni basin of New Mexico. It preserves fossils dating back to the late Cretaceous period.

== Description ==
The formation consists of uniform, very well sorted, fine-grained pink to buff sandstone with lesser amounts of shale and siltstone. It has a total thickness of 71 meters (233 ft). The sandstone is highly bioturbated and in some place shows ripple marks and low-angle crossbedding. It overlies and intertongues with the Mancos Shale and is overlain and intertongues with the Crevasse Canyon Formation. The formation has few faunal fossils, but the age is likely late Turonian to early Coniacian.

The formation is interpreted as an offshore marine transgression-regression sequence.

== History of investigation ==
The unit was first defined by J.D. Sears in 1925 as the Gallup Sandstone Member of the Mesaverde Formation and named after Gallup, New Mexico, which is built partially on its uppermost bed. Sears originally defined the Gallup Sandstone as the three sandstone beds, separated by shale and coal beds, forming cliffs and hogbacks in the Gallup area Pike first observed in 1947 that the member intertongues with the Mancos Shale (Pescado Tongue). Allen and Balk raised the Mesaverde Formation to group rank in 1954, which also raised the Gallup Sandstone to formation rank. The unit has since undergone repeated revisions, with the most recent revision by Nummedal and Molenaar in 1995 removing the fluvial Torrivio Member and restricting the formation to the basal 71 meters (233 ft) of marine sandstone of the Mesaverde Group.

== See also ==
- List of fossiliferous stratigraphic units in New Mexico
- Paleontology in New Mexico
