= Bursum Formation =

- Stratigraphic range: early Cisuralian
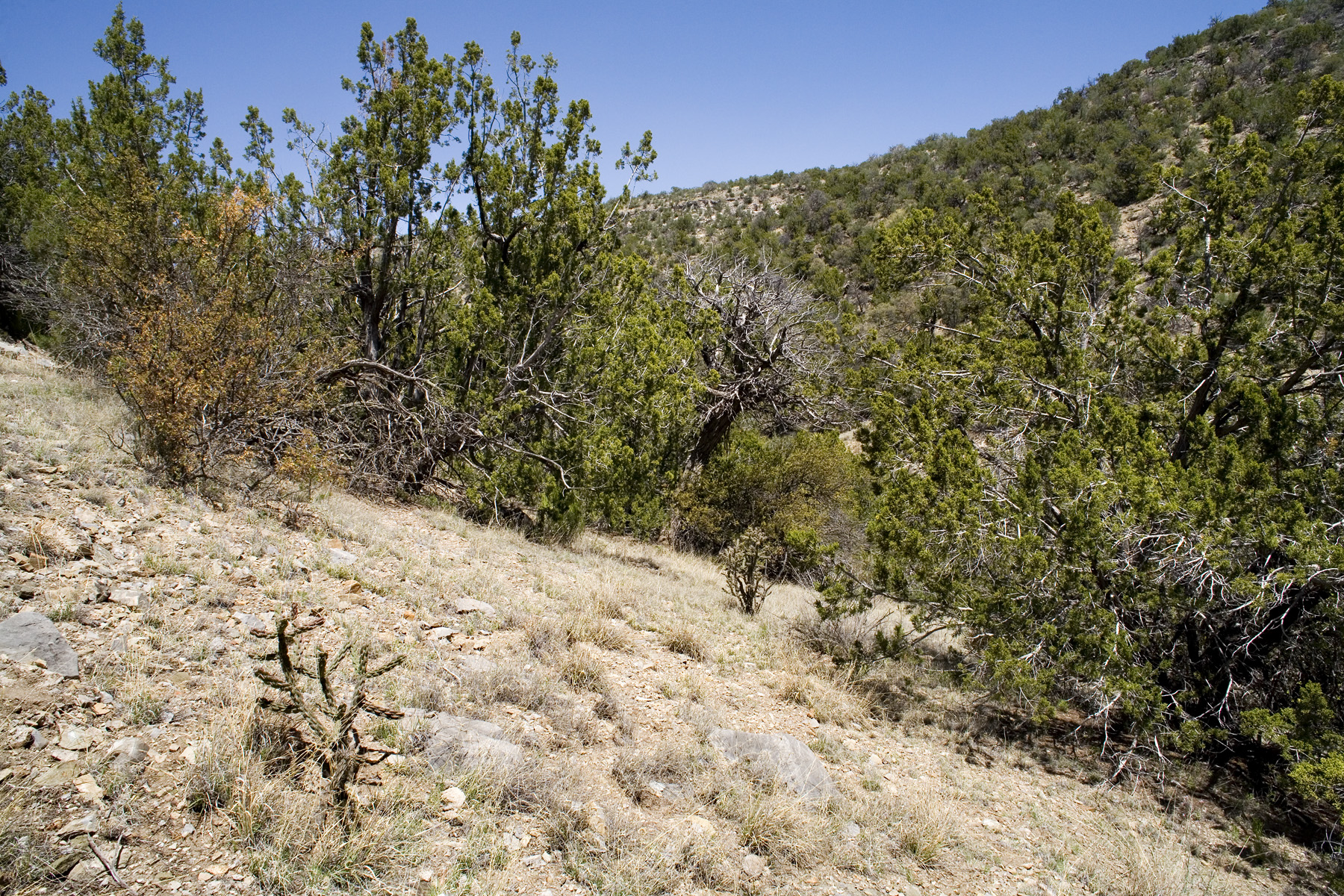
- Outcrops of the Bursum Formation in the Oscura Mountains, New Mexico
- Type: Formation
- Unit of: Madera Group
- Underlies: Abo Formation
- Overlies: Atrasado Formation
- Thickness: 35 m (115 ft)

Lithology
- Primary: Mudstone, limestone

Location
- Coordinates: 33.812698°N 106.478451°W
- Region: New Mexico
- Country: United States

Type section
- Named for: Bursum triangulation point
- Named by: Wilpolt, R.H., MacAlpin, A.J., Bates, R.L., and Vorbe, George
- Bursum Formation (the United States) Bursum Formation (New Mexico)

The Bursum Formation is a geologic formation in New Mexico. It preserves fossils dating back to the Early Permian period.

== Description ==
The Bursum Formation is primarily mudstone but with substantial limestone, particularly in its lower beds, with a thickness in excess of 100 m (330 ft). It rests disconformably on the Atrasado Formation and grades into the overlying Abo Formation. It represents the transitional zone between the marine Madera Group and the continental Abo Formation.

The Red Tanks Member is composed mostly of variegated shale, mudstone, and siltstone of nonmarine origin, with some beds of marine limestone and shale forming six transgressive depositional sequences. Its type section is at Carrizo Arroyo (34.7790683°N 107.1068066°W). It is also present at Abo Pass. The Bursum Formation has a more consistently marine character further south. The fact that the transgressive sequences are fewer in number than the cyclothems of the Pennsylvanian-Permian boundary in the North American mid-continent shows that tectonics had more influence on the development of this formation than glacial cycles.

== Fossil content ==
Fossils found in the formation include the fusulinid Triticites from which its early Permian age is determined. The formation also preserves fossils of the forams Bradyina lucida and Eostaffella. There are two Lagerstätten in the Red Tanks Member at Carrizo Arroyo that are of early Asselian age, while the recent definition of the base of the Permian as the first appearance of the conodont Streptognathus isolatus pushes the earliest part of the formation, and the associated North American Wolfcampian Stage back into the latest Pennsylvanian.

The Red Tanks Member also contains biogenic carbonate nodules (oncolites) at Cibola Spring (34.231151°N 106.6787895°W) in a distinctive, widespread limestone horizon. These are unusual in being composed mostly of forams rather than cyanobacteria and are interpreted as having formed in a shelf environment below the euphotic zone or normal wave base but above the storm wave base.

== History of investigation ==
The Bursum Formation was first defined by R.H. Wilpolt and coinvestigators in 1946 for exposures near the Bursum triangulation point in the northern Jornada del Muerto and in the Los Pinos Mountains. They assigned the formation to the (now-defunct) Magdalena Group. M.L. Thompson later redefined the formation as including all Permian beds older than the Abo Formation, characterizing these as transitional beds between the marine beds of the Madera Group and the Abo Formation. D.A. Myers assigned the formation to the Madera Group in 1972. In his revision of Pennsylvanian stratigraphy in New Mexico in 2001, Barry S. Kues retained this assignment, except in the Joyita Hills. He also correlated the formation with the Laborcita Formation and Red Tanks Formation (which he regarded as a separate formation).

== See also ==
- List of fossiliferous stratigraphic units in New Mexico
- Paleontology in New Mexico
