= Palomas Formation =

Geologic formation in New Mexico, USA

- Stratigraphic range: Pliocene to Quaternary; 5–0.4 Ma
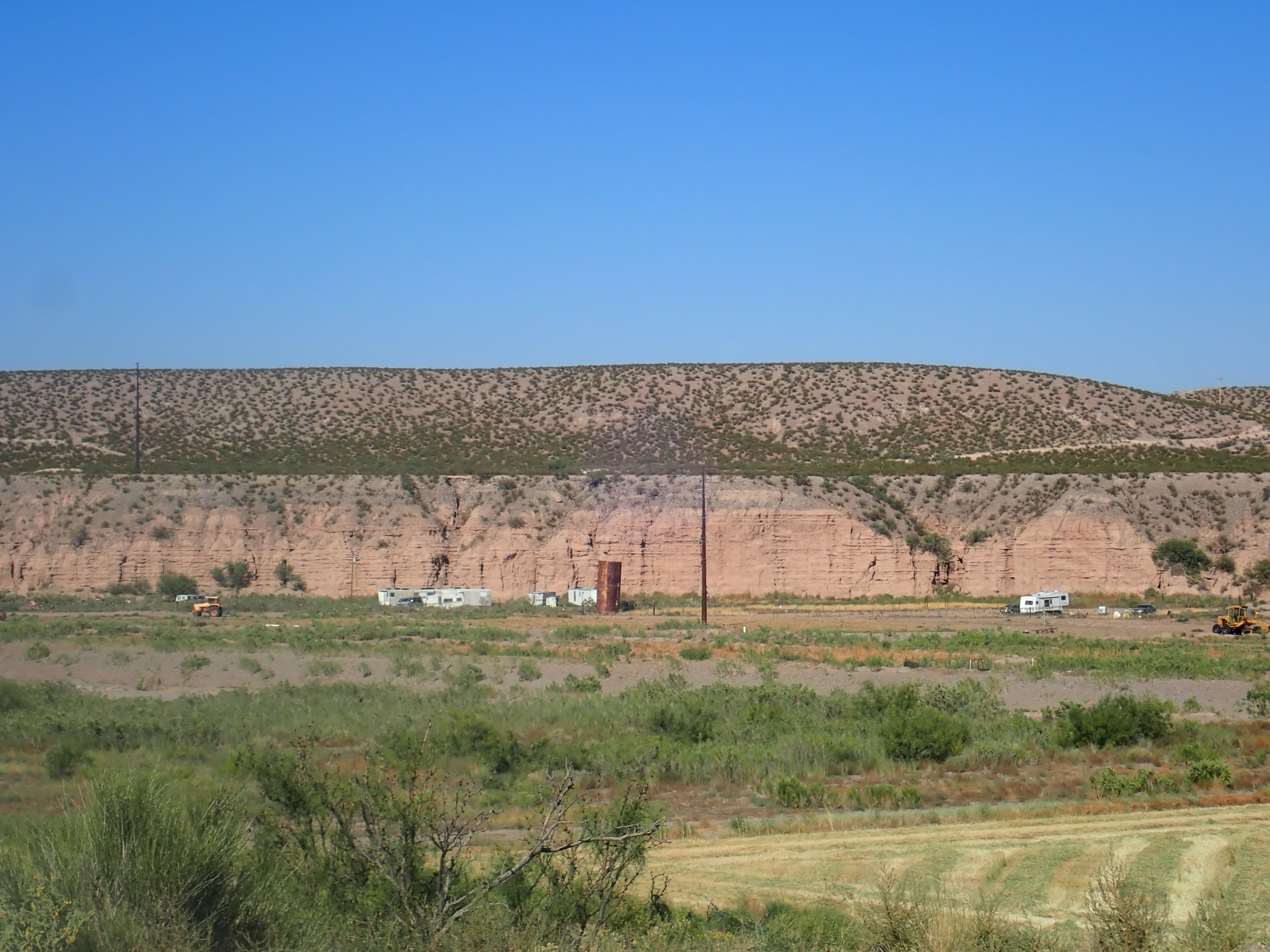
- Palomas Formation (pink beds in erosional escarpment) near its type section, Palomas Creek, New Mexico, USA
- Type: Formation
- Unit of: Santa Fe Group (geology)
- Overlies: Hayner Ranch Formation
- Thickness: 300–2,000 feet (91–610 m)

Lithology
- Primary: conglomerate
- Other: Sandstone, siltstone

Location
- Coordinates: 33.0545°N 107.2959°W
- Region: New Mexico
- Country: United States

Type section
- Named for: Palomas River
- Named by: C.H. Gordon
- Year defined: 1907
- Palomas Formation (the United States) Palomas Formation (New Mexico)

The Palomas Formation is a geologic formation exposed in the southern Rio Grande rift of New Mexico. It preserves fossils dating back to the Pliocene to Quaternary.

== Description ==
The formation is composed of beds of poorly cemented conglomerate, sandstone, and siltstone, with a total thickness of 300–2,000 feet (91–610 m). The formation is better cemented to the west, where it resembles the Gila Formation. The conglomerate is gray to brown, poorly to moderately sorted, and contains clasts of tuff, basalt, rhyolite, and andesite up to 40 centimetres (16 in) long. The siltstone is well-sorted and trough-crossbedded. The formation may correlate with the Sierra Ladrones Formation to the north and the Camp Rice Formation to the south. The age is estimated as 5 million years (Ma) to 0.4 Ma.

The formation includes both piedmont and axial river facies. The piedmont facies represents alluvial fans and other sediments deposited at the feet of the mountains surrounding the original depositional basin. The axial river facies represents deposition near the main channel of the ancestral Rio Grande River.

The lower part of the formation contains two nested paleovalleys near Truth or Consequences, New Mexico, recording climate fluctuations that incised and then backfilled the valleys. The first was incised and backfilled between 5.1 and 4.87 Ma, while the second dates to 4.87 to 4.5 Ma. The lack of axial river facies in the Palomas Formation between the Palomas and Mesilla Basins may be due to confinement of flow to narrow paleovalleys in this area.

== Fossils ==
The lower part of the formation contains fossil mammals and reptiles, including turtles, lizards, snakes, rabbits, rats, gophers, mastodons, horses, and deer. Paleomagnetic dating gives an age for this bed of 4.05 to 4.20 Ma.

== History of investigation ==
The unit was first named the Palomas Gravel by C.H. Gordon in 1907. It was renamed the Palomas Formation and assigned to the upper Santa Fe Group by Lozinsky and Hawley in 1986. However, Reppening and May regard it as post-Santa Fe.

== See also ==
- List of fossiliferous stratigraphic units in New Mexico
- Paleontology in New Mexico
