= Gray Mesa Formation =

- Stratigraphic range: Moscovian
- Type: Formation
- Unit of: Madera Group
- Sub-units: See text
- Underlies: Atrasado Formation
- Overlies: Sandia Formation
- Thickness: 192 m (630 ft)

Lithology
- Primary: Limestone
- Other: Shale, sandstone, conglomerate

Location
- Coordinates: 34.656°N 107.120°W
- Region: New Mexico
- Country: United States

Type section
- Named for: Gray Mesa (Mesa Aparejo)
- Named by: Kelley and Wood
- Year defined: 1946
- Gray Mesa Formation (the United States) Gray Mesa Formation (New Mexico)

The Gray Mesa Formation is a geologic formation in New Mexico. Its fossil assemblage dates the formation to the Moscovian age of the Pennsylvanian.

The formation as presently defined includes outcrops previously assigned to many local units, including the Los Moyos Formation, the Armendaris Group, and the Nakaye Formation.

== Description ==
The formation consists mostly of cherty limestone, with a few shale, sandstone, and conglomerate beds. It is exposed in the Sandia Mountains, the Lucero Uplift (34.621°N 107.299°W), the western Jemez Mountains, and the Manzano Mountains.

The formation has been mapped as the Los Moyos Formation in the Manzano Mountains, but Spencer G. Lucas and coinvestigators have recommended abandoning the name Los Moyos Formation and using Grey Mesa Formation throughout the Madera Group. The Gray Mesa Formation likely correlates with the Porvenir Formation in the southeastern Sangre de Cristo Mountains.

The formation is underlain at most locations by the Sandia Formation, with its base typically placed at the first massive marine limestone bed above the shales of the Sandia Formation. It is overlain by the Atrasado Formation, with the contact placed at the base of a sandstone interval above the uppermost massive limestone of the Gray Mesa Formation.

=== Members ===
The lowermost Elephant Butte Member is about 24 meters (79 feet) thick and is 78% limestone, half of which contains minor amounts of chert, with indistinct medium to thick bedding. Limestone intervals are 0.6–4.5 meters (2.0–14.8 feet) thick and separated byh thin shale beds.

The middle Whiskey Canyon Member is about 84 meters (276 feet) thick and is 46% very cherty limestone and 15% slightly cherty limestone, with perhaps 35% shale. Limestone intervals are up to 4.1 meters (13 feet) thick and separated by shale beds that are 0.4–2.7 meters (1.3–8.9 feet), with one larger (8.3 meters (27 feet)) shale interval in the middle of the member.

The uppermost Garcia Member is 84 meters (276 feet) and is 39% non-cherty limestone, 18% cherty limestone, and 7% shale, sandstone, and conglomerate, with the rest covered. Its base is a thin sandstone on top of an eroded limestone bed. Algal limestone is abundant. Limestone intervals are 0.5–6.8 meters (1.6–22.3 feet) thick and separated by shale beds that are 0.4–9.7 meters (1.3–31.8 feet).

== Fossils ==
The Elephant Butte Member contains silicified fossils of the demosponge Chaetetes, brachiopods, solitary corals and fusulinids. The Whiskey Canyon Member contains crinoids, brachiopods, solitary corals, rare calcareous algae, and fusulinids. The Garcia Member contains crinoids, brachiopods, rare bryozoans, fusulinids, calcareous algae, and oncoids.

== History of investigation ==
The unit was first designated as the Gray Mesa Member of the Madera Group by Kelley and Wood in 1946.

The Pennsylvanian stratigraphy of New Mexico has historically been unusually complex and inconsistent, with dozens of names for groups, formations, and members. Kues and Giles recommended that the name Madera Group be applied to similar exposures of shelf and marginal basin beds of Desmoinean (upper Moscovian) to early Virgilian age found from north-central and central New Mexico south along the west side of the Orogrande Basin as far as the Caballo and Robledo Mountains. Lucas and coinvestigators recommend discarding the name Los Moyos Formation and using Grey Mesa Formation throughout the Madera Group. With the Elephant Butte, Whiskey Canyon, and Garcia Formations redesignated as members of the Gray Mesa Formation, the Armendaris Group is abandoned as a synonym for the Gray Mesa Formation. The Nakaye Formation of the Fra Cristobal and Caballo Mountains is also abandoned as a synonym for the Gray Mesa Formation.

== See also ==
- List of fossiliferous stratigraphic units in New Mexico
- Paleontology in New Mexico
