= Barry Kues =

American paleontologist

Barry Stephen Kues
- Born: March 15, 1946 (age 80); Santa Monica, California, U.S.
- Education: University of California, Riverside (BA); Scripps Institution of Oceanography (MS); Indiana University Bloomington (PhD)
- Known for: Paleontology of New Mexico; ;History of Geological Studies in New Mexico
- Awards: New Mexico Earth Science Achievement Award (2019); Honorary Life Member of the New Mexico Geological Society
- Scientific career
- Fields: Paleontology, geology, stratigraphy
- Workplaces: University of New Mexico

Barry Stephen Kues (born March 15, 1946) is an American paleontologist and Professor Emeritus in the Department of Earth and Planetary Sciences at the University of New Mexico. His research has focused on the stratigraphy and paleontology of the Pennsylvanian, Permian, and Cretaceous formations of the American Southwest, and he is recognized for his contributions to the study of marine invertebrates and the history of geological research in New Mexico. Kues is an Honorary Life Member of the New Mexico Geological Society.

Over a five-decade academic career, he has authored or co-authored nearly 300 scientific publications, including major reference works on the fossils and geological development of the region.

== Biography ==
Kues was born in Santa Monica, California, and raised in southern California. He received a B.A. in zoology from the University of California, Riverside in 1967, followed by an M.S. in marine biology from the Scripps Institution of Oceanography at the University of California, San Diego in 1969. He completed his Ph.D. in geology at Indiana University Bloomington in 1974, where his dissertation examined the paleoecology of the Permian Oketo Member of the Barneston Limestone in Kansas and Nebraska.

== Career ==
Kues joined the University of New Mexico in 1974 as an Assistant Professor of Geology after completing his Ph.D. at Indiana University. He remained at the university for the entirety of his academic career, advancing to Associate Professor in 1980 and Full Professor in 1992. He supervised master’s and doctoral students and served in numerous administrative and service roles.

He was Assistant Chair of the department from 1981 to 1986 and twice served as Acting Chair before being appointed Chair of the Department of Earth and Planetary Sciences from 1991 to 1999. He retired from regular teaching duties in 2011 and was named Professor Emeritus. At UNM he also participated in university governance, including the Faculty Senate, where he chaired the Library and Budget Committees, and he contributed to planning and advisory committees across the College of Arts and Sciences and the Office of the President. Beyond the university, he held positions as Adjunct Curator of Paleontology at the New Mexico Museum of Natural History and Science and served as a Research Associate of the New Mexico Bureau of Geology and Mineral Resources.

Kues played a notable role in the efforts that led to the establishment of the New Mexico Museum of Natural History and Science in Albuquerque. In 1977, he led a paleontological survey of northwestern New Mexico for the U.S. Bureau of Land Management, and the resulting documentation contributed to statewide advocacy for a state natural history museum, which opened in 1986. He later collaborated with museum staff and educational organizations to expand public access to paleontological resources and research.

Kues is an Honorary Life Member of the New Mexico Geological Society and has been recognized for shaping the documentation and interpretation of the region’s fossil record. He received the New Mexico Earth Science Achievement Award, presented by the New Mexico Bureau of Geology and Mineral Resources in 2019.

In retirement he continues to write, consult, and review papers on New Mexico paleontology and stratigraphy, and serves as a member of the Board of Trustees of the New Mexico Museum of Natural History and Science.

== Research ==
Kues's research has focused on the late Paleozoic and middle Cretaceous paleontology and stratigraphy of the American Southwest, particularly New Mexico. His work on the marine faunas of these intervals contributed to knowledge of their taxonomic diversity (with more than 75 new species named), evolution, paleoecology, and biostratigraphy across the region.

He is most widely known for his studies of late Paleozoic gastropods and mid-Cretaceous oysters, emphasizing their taxonomy, paleoecology, and evolution. In addition, he has conducted research and published on numerous other invertebrate groups, including late Paleozoic pelecypods, polyplacophorans, cephalopods, eurypterids, crinoids, and brachiopods as well as Cretaceous crabs and seastars; and a few vertebrate groups, such as Late Cretaceous dinosaurs and mosasaurs, and a Paleocene crocodilian. In a related line of scholarship, he became one of the principal historians of geological and paleontological science in New Mexico, documenting the development of knowledge of the state's geology from the mid-nineteenth century onward.

Kues has published nearly 300 works, including journal articles, monographs, and major reference syntheses. His books Fossils of New Mexico (1982) and The Paleontology of New Mexico (2008) became widely used guides to the region’s fossil record, while A Brief History of Geological Studies in New Mexico (2014) provided a comprehensive narrative of the discipline’s institutional and intellectual development. He also co-edited eleven volumes, including field conference guidebooks for the New Mexico Geological Society. His editorial contributions extended to the New Mexico Journal of Science, where he served as editor from 1986 to 1991, and to New Mexico Geology, where he served on the editorial board beginning in 2000.

== Selected Publications ==
=== Books ===
- Kues, B. S (1982). Fossils of New Mexico. University of New Mexico Press. ISBN 978-0-8263-0613-5.
- Kues, B.S (December 16, 2008). The Paleontology of New Mexico by Kues, Barry S |... University of New Mexico Press. p. 446. ISBN 978-0826341365.
- Kues, B.S (January 1, 2014). A Brief History of Geological Studies in New Mexico, with Biographical Profiles of Notable New Mexico Geologists. New Mexico Geological Society, Special Publication 12. p. 230. ISBN 978-1585460113.

=== Journal Articles and book chapters ===
- Kues, B.S (1989). "Taxonomy and variability of three Texigryphaea (Bivalvia) species from their Lower Cretaceous (Albian) type localities in New Mexico and Oklahoma". Journal of Paleontology. 63 (4): 454–483. Bibcode:1989JPal...63..454K. doi:10.1017/S0022336000019697.
- Kues, B.S (1995). “Marine fauna of the Early Permian (Wolfcampian) Robledo Mountains Member, Hueco Formation, southern Robledo Mountains, New Mexico”. New Mexico Museum of Natural History and Science Bulletin. 6:63-90.
- Kues, B.S; Batten, Roger L. (January 2001). "Middle Pennsylvanian Gastropods from the Flechado Formation, North-Central New Mexico". Journal of Paleontology. 75 (sp54): 1–95. doi:10.1666/0022-3360(2001)75[1:MPGFTF]2.0.CO;2.
- Kues, Barry S. (2001). "The Pennsylvanian system in New Mexico-overview with suggestions for revision of stratigraphic nomenclature". New Mexico Geology. 23 (4) 33144: 103–122. doi:10.58799/nmg-v23n4.103. ISSN 2837-6420.
- Kues, B.S; Giles, K.A; Mack, G.H; Lawton, T.F (2002). "A Late Pennsylvanian outer shelf marine fauna from a highstand systems tract, Derry Hills, south-central New Mexico" (PDF). New Mexico Geology. 24 (4). New Mexico Bureau of Geology & Mineral Resources: 121–130. doi:10.58799/NMG-v24n4.121. ISSN 2837-6420.
- Kues, B. S (2002). "New Genera and Species of Middle Pennsylvanian Gastropods from West Texas". Journal of Paleontology. 76 (1): 52–62. doi:10.1666/0022-3360(2002)076<0052:NGASOM>2.0.CO;2. ISSN 0022-3360. JSTOR 1307175.
- Kues, Barry S. (2004). “Stratigraphy and brachiopod and molluscan paleontology of the Red Tanks Formation (Madera Group) near the Pennsylvanian-Permian boundary, Lucero uplift, west-central New Mexico”. New Mexico Museum of Natural History and Science Bulletin. 25:143-209.
- Kues, B.S; Giles, K.A (2004). "The late Paleozoic Ancestral Rocky Mountains system in New Mexico". In Giles, K.A; Mack, G.H (eds.). The Geology of New Mexico, a Geologic History. New Mexico Geological Society. pp. 95–136. ISBN 978-1585460106.
- Kues, B.S (2012). "The geology of New Mexico as understood in 1912: an essay for the centennial of New Mexico statehood: Part 3". New Mexico Geology. 34 (3) 127331: 67–75. doi:10.58799/nmg-v34n3.67. S2CID 262324243.
