= Crevasse Canyon Formation =

Geologic formation in New Mexico and Arizona

- Stratigraphic range: Santonian
- Type: Formation
- Unit of: Mesaverde Group
- Sub-units: Dilco Coal, Dalton Sandstone & Gibson Coal Members
- Underlies: Point Lookout Sandstone
- Overlies: Gallup Sandstone
- Thickness: 700 ft (210 m)

Lithology
- Primary: Sandstone, mudstone, coal

Location
- Coordinates: 35.7916°N 108.9446°W
- Region: New Mexico, Arizona
- Country: United States
- Extent: San Juan Basin

Type section
- Named for: Crevasse Canyon
- Named by: Allen and Balk
- Year defined: 1954
- Crevasse Canyon Formation (the United States) Crevasse Canyon Formation (New Mexico)

The Crevasse Canyon Formation is a coal-bearing Cretaceous geologic formation in New Mexico and Arizona.

== Description ==
The formation is divided into three members, in ascending stratigraphic order: Dilco Coal Member, Dalton Sandstone Member, and Gibson Coal Member. The Dilco Coal Member is described by Cather (2010) as "Drab mudstone, fine- to medium-grained sandstone, and coal. Sandstone is commonly crossbedded or ripple laminated." The Dalton Sandstone Member is described as "Gray to yellowish gray, fine- to medium-grained, cliff-forming sandstone." The Gibson Coal Member is described as "Drab mudstone, buff, brown, and greenish gray sandstone (commonly cross-bedded), and coal," with the coals typically less than 0.5 m thick. Thickness is 700 feet (210 m) at the type section.

In some exposures, the Dilco Coal Member is separated from the Dalton Sandstone Member by the Mulatto Tongue of the Mancos Shale. A fourth member of the Crevasse Canyon Formation, the Borrego Pass Lentil, is found in a limited exposure area between the Dilco Coal Member and the Mulatto Tongue. The Borrego Pass Lentil is a highly variable sandstone.

In southern New Mexico, the Crevasse Canyon Formation contains fossil soils (paleosols) typical of a humid climate (alfisol and inceptisols). The underlying Mojado Formation contains paleosols typical of an arid climate (aridisols), suggesting a shift from an arid to a humid climate across the lower Cretaceous - upper Cretaceous boundary in this region.

== Fossil content ==
Dinosaur remains are among the fossils that have been recovered from the formation, although none have yet been referred to a specific genus. The formation is the type formation for Neurankylus notos, a baenid turtle that is the earliest representative of its genus. Two dinosaur fossil trackways have been identified in the formation near Elephant Butte Reservoir.

Petrified wood is common in the Gibson Coal Member.

== Age ==
Tschudy (1976) identified the Crevasse Canyon formation as Coniacian and Santonian by palynology of coal and shale.

== Economic resources ==
In the San Juan Basin, the Gibson Coal Member and the Dilco Coal Member were exploited for coal for steam locomotives from the 1940s to the 1990s. However, they constitute less than 1% of the original coal reserves of San Juan Basin.

== History of investigation ==
The formation was originally described in 1954 by Allen and Balk as part of the Mesaverde Group.

== See also ==
- List of dinosaur-bearing rock formations
  - List of stratigraphic units with indeterminate dinosaur fossils
