= Arkose =

Type of sandstone containing at least 25% feldspar

- Sedimentary rock
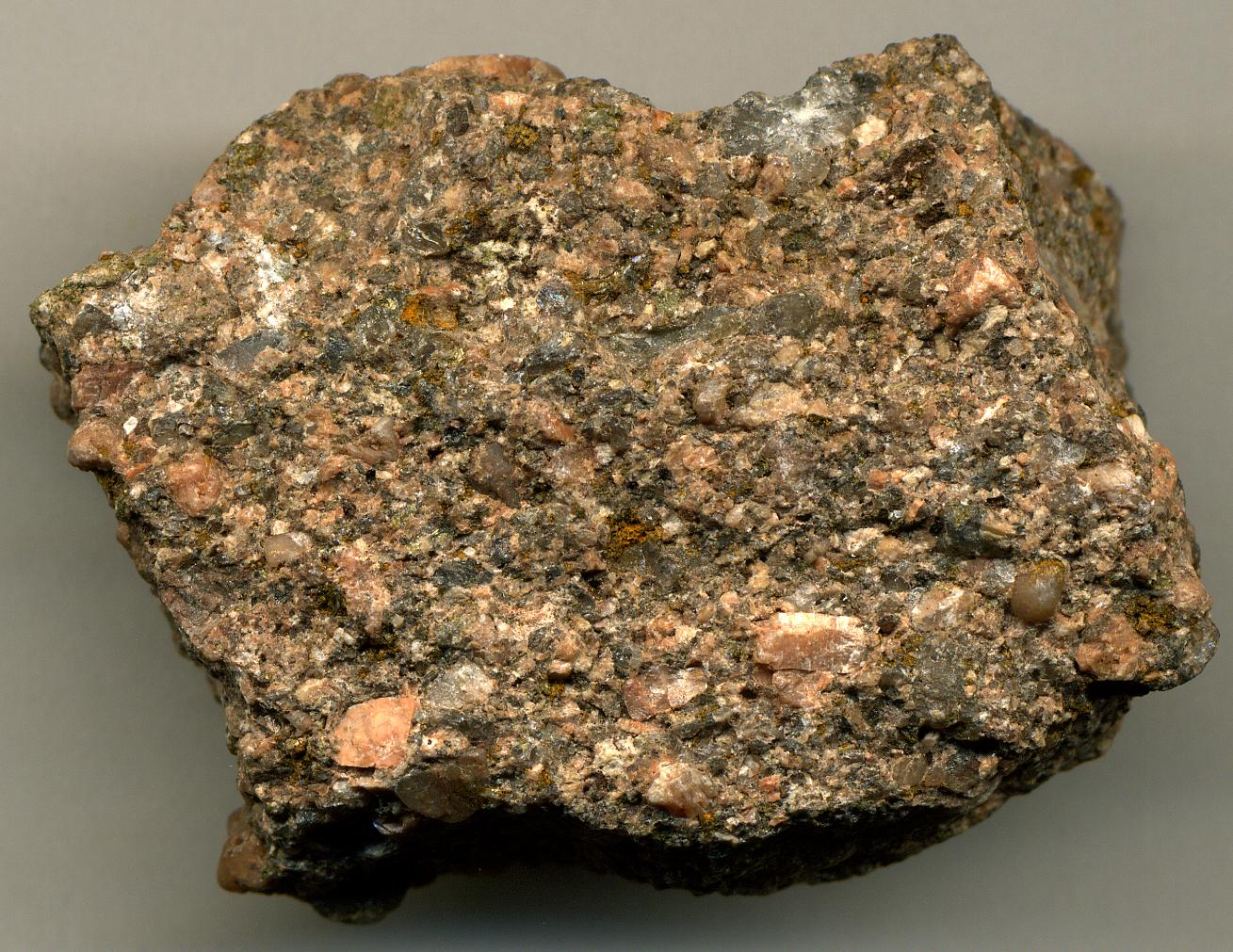
- Arkose with K-feldspar (pinkish-orangish) and quartz (gray) grains

Composition
- >25% feldspar

Arkose (/ˈɑːrkoʊs, -koʊz/) or arkosic sandstone is a detrital sedimentary rock, specifically a type of sandstone containing at least 25% feldspar. Arkosic sand is sand that is similarly rich in feldspar, and thus the potential precursor of arkose.

== Components ==
Quartz is commonly the dominant mineral component, and some mica is often present. Apart from the mineral content, rock fragments may also be a significant component. Arkose usually contains small amounts of calcite cement, which causes it to effervesce (fizz) slightly in dilute hydrochloric acid; sometimes the cement also contains iron oxide.

== Colouration and presence of fossils ==
Arkose is typically grey to reddish in colour. The sand grains making up an arkose may range from fine to very coarse, but tend toward the coarser end of the scale. Fossils are rare in arkose, due to the depositional processes that form it, although bedding is frequently visible.

== Formation process ==
Arkose is generally formed in a tectonically unstable environment during the late-stage and immediate aftermath of an orogeny from the weathering of feldspar-rich igneous or metamorphic, most commonly granitic rocks, which are primarily composed of quartz and feldspar (called 'grus' as a sand). These sediments must be deposited rapidly and/or in a cold or arid environment such that the feldspar does not undergo significant chemical weathering and decomposition; therefore arkose is designated a texturally immature sedimentary rock. Arkose is often associated with conglomerate deposits sourced from granitic terrain and is often found above unconformities in the immediate vicinity of granite terrains.

== Gallery ==
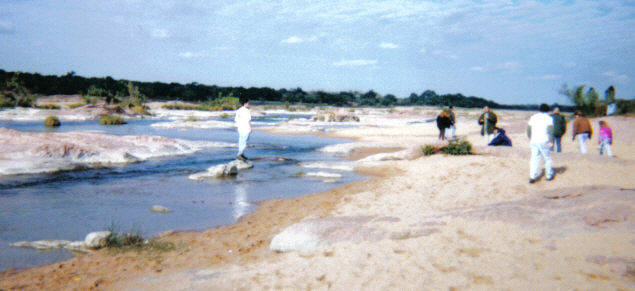
Arkosic sand in the Llano Uplift, Texas, with granite outcrops

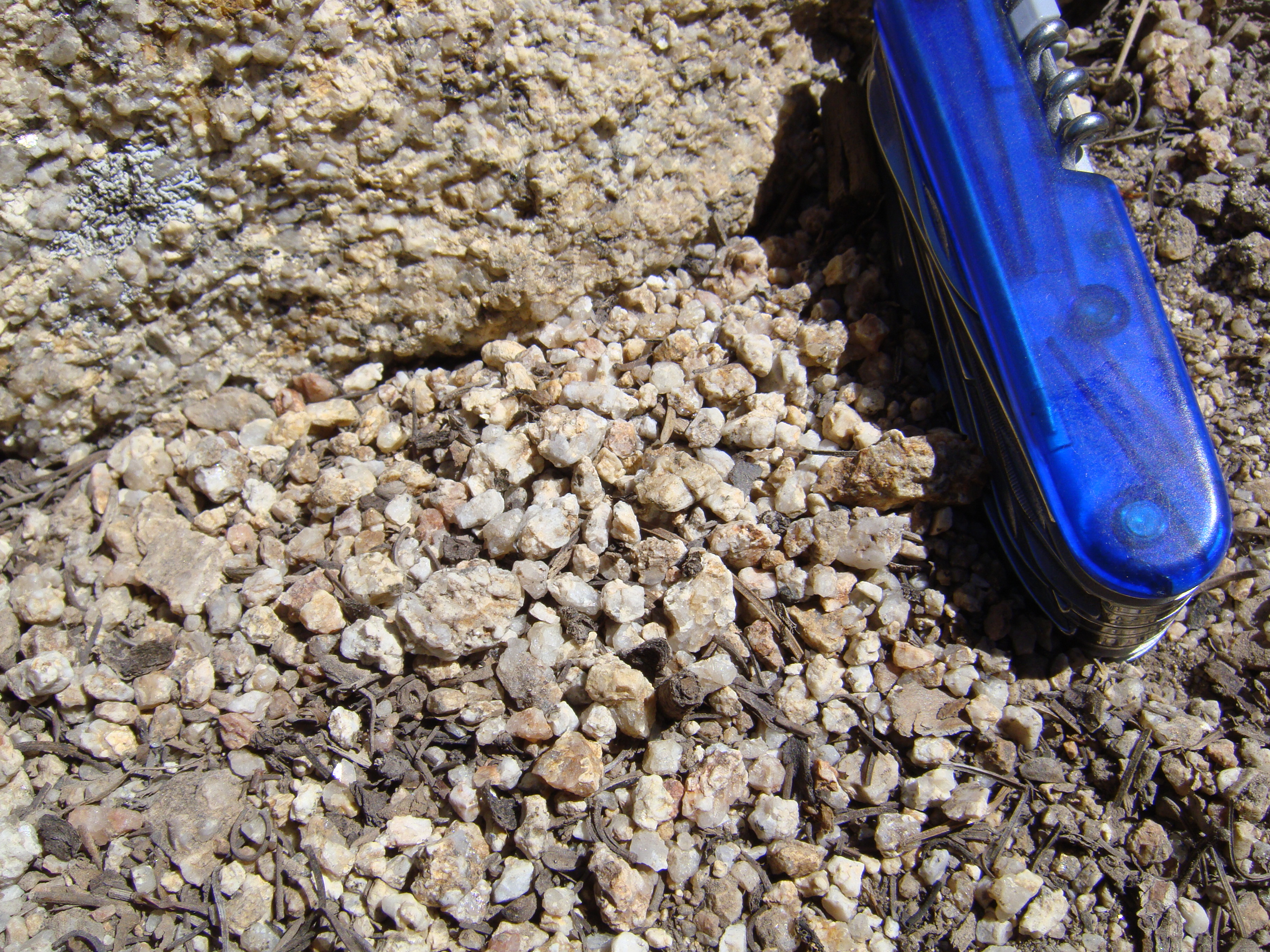
Grus sand and the granitoid it's derived from

== Uluru ==
The central Australian inselberg Uluru (Ayers Rock) is composed of late Neoproterozoic/Cambrian arkose, deposited in the Amadeus Basin.

== See also ==
- Lithic sandstone – Sandstone with fragments of other rocks
