= Spencer G. Lucas =

American paleontologist

Spencer George Lucas
- Citizenship: American
- Education: University of New Mexico, Yale University
- Scientific career
- Fields: Paleontology
- Workplaces: New Mexico Museum of Natural History and Science
- Author abbrev. (zoology): S. G. Lucas

Spencer George Lucas is an American paleontologist and stratigrapher, and curator of paleontology at the New Mexico Museum of Natural History and Science. His main areas of study are late Paleozoic, Mesozoic and early Cenozoic vertebrate fossils, stratigraphy, and continental deposits, particularly in the American Southwest. His research has taken him on field trips to northern Mexico, Costa Rica, Nicaragua, Jamaica, Kazakhstan, and Georgia, and he conducted extensive field and museum research in China in the 1980s and 1990s. He has written more than 500 scientific contributions (about 25-percent are articles in peer-reviewed journals), three books, and has co-edited 14 books.

In 2007, some publications by Lucas and associates at the New Mexico Museum of Natural History and Science came under scrutiny after allegations that information was improperly taken from the unpublished and in-press work of graduate students not on his team. Formal complaints were made to the New Mexico Department of Cultural Affairs regarding publications on a new genus of aetosaur (a type of armored prehistoric reptile from the Triassic), and a reinterpretation of another aetosaur's armor. In July 2008, the Ethics Committee of the Society of Vertebrate Paleontology concluded that the matter could not be resolved in favor of either side.

In 2012, he co-authored a paper describing the world's smallest tetrapod footprints, found at Joggins, Nova Scotia.

Lucas was a master-level chess player (New Mexico state champion in 1973 and 1974). He gave up chess, for the most part, in the mid-1970s to focus on his academic career.

== See also ==
- Category:Taxa named by Spencer G. Lucas

== Books ==
- Lucas, Spencer G. Dinosaurs : the textbook (Sixth ed.). New York. ISBN 0231173113.
- Lucas, Spencer G.; Bailey, Garrick; Davis, Andrew; Scheinbaum, David; Newhall, Beaumont (1987). Bisti (1st ed.). Albuquerque: University of New Mexico Press. ISBN 978-0826309785.
- Lucas, Spencer G. (2001). Chinese fossil vertebrates. New York: Columbia University Press. ISBN 978-0231084833.
- Khosla, Ashu; Lucas, Spencer G. (2020). Late Cretaceous Dinosaur Eggs and Eggshells of Peninsular India. [S.l.]: SPRINGER NATURE. ISBN 978-3030564537.
