= Paleontology in New Mexico =

Paleontological research in the U.S. state of New Mexico

The location of the state of New Mexico

Paleontology in New Mexico refers to paleontological research occurring within or conducted by people from the U.S. state of New Mexico. The fossil record of New Mexico is exceptionally complete and spans almost the entire stratigraphic column. More than 3,300 different kinds of fossil organisms have been found in the state. More than 700 of these were new to science and more than 100 of those were type species for new genera. During the early Paleozoic, southern and western New Mexico were submerged by a warm shallow sea that would come to be home to creatures including brachiopods, bryozoans, cartilaginous fishes, corals, graptolites, nautiloids, placoderms, and trilobites. During the Ordovician the state was home to algal reefs up to 300 feet high. During the Carboniferous, a richly vegetated island chain emerged from the local sea. Coral reefs formed in the state's seas while terrestrial regions of the state dried and were home to sand dunes. Local wildlife included Edaphosaurus, Ophiacodon, and Sphenacodon.

Triassic New Mexico had a seasonal climate and was home to a richly vegetated flood plain where early dinosaurs such as Coelophysis lived. During the Jurassic New Mexico had a relatively dry climate and was home to dinosaurs such as Allosaurus, Stegosaurus, and the huge long-necked sauropods. Seawater covered eastern New Mexico during the Cretaceous, while on land dinosaurs, including tyrannosaurs, maintained their dominance. Early in the Cenozoic New Mexico was swampy, but gradually the local climate cooled. Local wildlife included creatures such as amblypods, carnivorans, condylarths, the 7-foot tall flightless bird Diatryma, three-toed horses, marsupials, multituberculates, and taeniodonts. Cooler climates eventually ushered in the Ice Age, when the state was home to mastodons.

Local Native Americans devised myths to explain local fossil bones and petrified wood. New Mexico's fossils first came to the attention of formally trained scientists by the mid-19th century. Major finds in the state include Coryphodon, a mummy of the ground sloth Nothrotherium, Triassic Coelophysis bonebeds, bonebeds of Triassic amphibians and the gigantic sauropod formerly known as Seismosaurus. The Triassic dinosaur Coelophysis bauri is the New Mexico state fossil.

== Prehistory ==
No Precambrian fossils are known from New Mexico, so the state's fossil record does not begin until the Paleozoic. During the Late Cambrian, the southern third of New Mexico was a marine environment. This habitat was home to a few kinds of brachiopods, a species of graptolite, and trilobites. Local trace fossils include bore marks left by ancient worms. The southern third of New Mexico remained submerged by the sea throughout the entire ensuing Ordovician. More than two hundred kinds of invertebrate lived in Ordovician New Mexico. Groups present included brachiopods, bryozoans, corals, gastropods, nautiloids, pelecypods, sponges, and trilobites. Algae made reefs up to three hundred feet high. Marine conditions in southern New Mexico persisted on through the Silurian. At least 66 kinds of invertebrates made their home here. Groups familiar from the Ordovician, including brachiopods, bryozoans, corals, gastropods, a nautiloid, and a pelecypod, were among them. Marine conditions were not as predominant in Devonian New Mexico, nevertheless the marine Sly Gap and Percha Formations of the state's southwest provide the best fossils of the age. Over two hundred kinds of Devonian marine life lived and died in the region. The familiar invertebrate groups including bryozoans, cephalopods, corals, gastropods, and pelecypods were all present. Notably these were joined by vertebrates, including placoderms from two different suborders, cartilaginous fishes and more. Although the Percha and Sly Gap are the same age, they don't share even a single individual species in common.

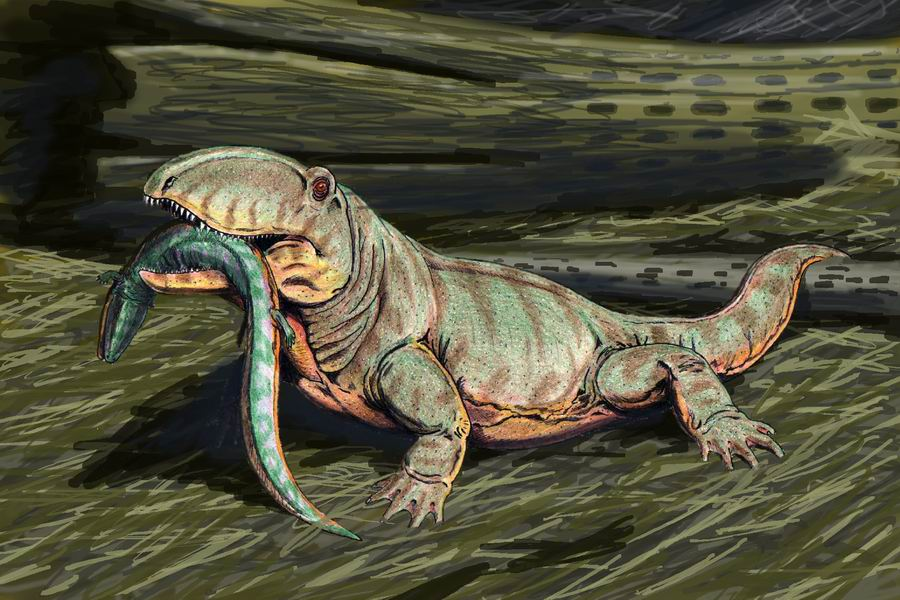
Ophiacodon.

An island chain began forming in New Mexico's shallow sea during the Carboniferous. Areas still submerged were home to brachiopods and clams. The islands themselves were thickly vegetated with forests and swamps. Into the Mississippian, crinoids and other fossil life built huge bioherms. The local Mississippian biodiversity included at least 6 kinds of blastoids 202 brachiopods, 33 bryozoans, 57 corals, 85 crinoids, 22 gastropods, 7 nautiloids, 8 pelecypods, 9 trilobites, and others including foraminiferans and starfishes. On land primitive plants grew in New Mexico. The state's Mississippian flora of New Mexico included horsetails and scale trees. Pennsylvanian New Mexico experienced both marine and terrestrial conditions over time. Marine life included more than 157 species of brachiopods, 41 bryozoans, 34 cephalopods, 34 corals, 118 foraminiferans, 87 gastropods, 25 ostracods and 85 pelecypods. Exceptional brachiopod specimens from this time still retain traces of their shell colorations. The foraminiferans were present in "tremendous abundance", with the most common varieties being fusulinids. Other important fossils provide paleoecological evidence for Pennsylvanian parasitism. 60 different kind of plants grew above the surface of New Mexico's Pennsylvanian waters. Early in the ensuing Permian period the local climate dried significantly. Local rivers dried up and fields of sand dunes took their place. Sea levels dropped and the water became extremely salty. During the middle part of the Permian the seas returned to a more typical state. At this time a huge reef system began to form at El Capitan in the southeastern part of the state. Most of New Mexico was under seawater during the ensuing Permian. More than 300 kinds of marine life have been discovered in the state. On land, at least 20 kinds of plants including early conifers, horsetails, and seed ferns grew. New Mexico's terrestrial environments were inhabited by creatures such as Aerosaurus, Edaphosaurus, Limnoscelis, Ophiacodon, and Sphenacodon. Many of these creatures' footprints were preserved in mudflats that are contained within the Prehistoric Trackways National Monument in Las Cruces.

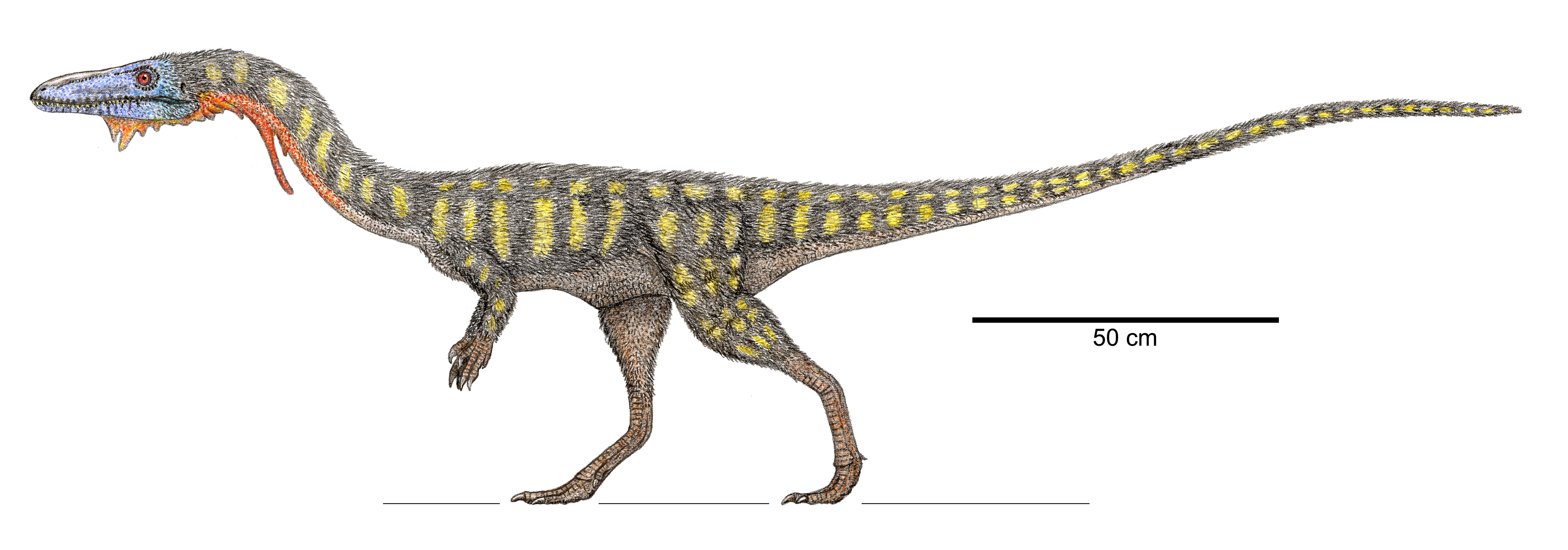
Dinosaur genus Coelophysis. Restoration with scale bar, made for Petrified Forest National Park.

220 million years ago, during the Late Triassic deposition of the Dockum Group, eastern New Mexico was a basin receiving sediments carried downhill by streams and rivers. These sediments were probably trapped locally, burying the remains that would compose the area's fossil record, instead of making their way to the sea. A similar modern depositional scenario is found in the Great Basin of Nevada and Utah. The presence of lime nodules that formed in the ancient soils provides evidence for a strongly seasonal climate. For part of the year the climate was very dry. Contemporary algae was preserved in local freshwater deposits. The local streams and lakes held animals such as freshwater clams, fish, ostracods, and snails. A lush flora grew in the local floodplains. At the same time, plants such as conifers, cordaitales, cycads, and horsetails, greened the New Mexican landscape. The early dinosaur Coelophysis inhabited the region. Prosauropods were also present but rare in Late Triassic New Mexico. The Jurassic of New Mexico is poorly known. Evidence suggests that the state had a relatively dry climate. The local environment was a coastal plain. Local dinosaurs were preserved in the sediments of the Morrison Formation. New Mexico's Late Jurassic dinosaurs included Allosaurus, Stegosaurus, and the massive long-necked sauropods.

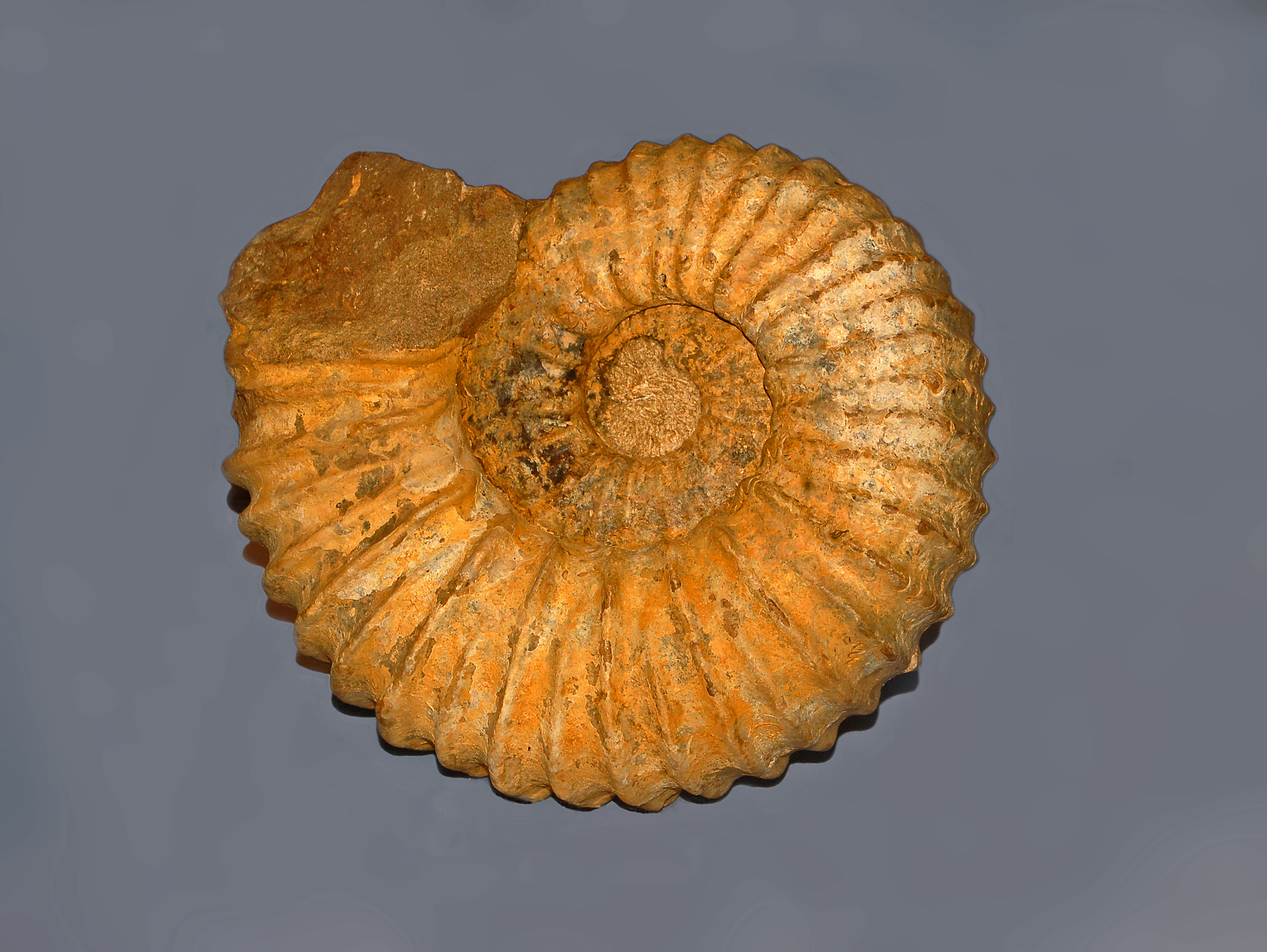
Mantelliceras.

Eastern New Mexico was inundated by seawater once more during the Cretaceous period. This sea was home to ammonites and oysters. Throughout the Cretaceous over 900 different kinds of life are known to have lived in New Mexico. Most fossils known from Early Cretaceous times were of marine invertebrates. The Western Interior Seaway came to cover most of the state during the Late Cretaceous. At least 450 species lived in New Mexico during the Late Cretaceous. Most of the marine invertebrates of that era were much larger than modern types. At the time New Mexico's waters were home to giant snails with shells up to 18 inches across. The largest known local ammonite from the Late Cretaceous was Mantelliceras canitaurium, whose shell could be up to 16 inches in diameter. The Cretaceous sharks of New Mexico were very similar to their contemporaries in Kansas.

On land a diverse flora grew that included at least 14 different kinds of fern, 16 figs, 8 honeysuckles, 5 willows, and trees that left behind petrified logs more than 30 feet long. The local vertebrates included crocodiles, at least 16 different kinds of turtles. However, dinosaurs still dominated the state's terrestrial environments. Examples include ceratopsians, Bistahieversor, ornithopods, and sauropods. Some of these dinosaurs left behind an abundant trace fossil record. At the time the Dakota Formation was being deposited in northeastern New Mexico, more than 500 dinosaur tracks were imprinted in the sediments of Clayton Lake State Park. Another New Mexican Dakota exposure contains 55 parallel trackways left by ornithopods moving northward on all-fours. This site, the Mosquero Creek site, also preserves a series of ten or more parallel trackways left by even larger two-legged ornithopod moving in the opposite direction as the other ornithopods. These New Mexican tracks provide important evidence of social behavior in dinosaurs.

Geologic upheaval during the early Cenozoic era formed the state's basin and range physiographic province. The landscape was divided by rivers and dotted by lakes. Garfish inhabited the local lakes while magnolias grew in the floodplains between rivers. Many volcanic eruptions occurred in the region at this time. The Raton area was covered in swamps during the Paleocene epoch of the Cenozoic era. The individual leaves from some of the contemporary palms could be more than 9 feet wide. At least 42 different kinds of mammals lived in New Mexico at the time. Groups including the amblypods, carnivorans, condylarths, marsupials, multituberculates, and taeniodonts. Other kinds of animal life included two kinds of crocodiles, fishes, snails relatives of the modern tuatara, and 16 kinds of turtle.

The Eocene fossils of New Mexico include 120 different animal species. Aquatic life included clams, fishes, and snails. On land, the mammals were very diverse, represented by more than eighty species from 23 families and 10 orders. The Eocene Baca Formation of Socorro County preserves 18 footprints in three separate parallel trackways. The trackmakers were probably pecorans, but may have been members of the camel family. Since the trackways share a parallel orientation they provide important evidence for social behavior in ancient mammals and are among the oldest known fossil footprints left by cloven-hoofed mammals. Another interesting local Eocene inhabitant was the 7-foot tall flightless bird Diatryma.

Very few identifiable fossils have been discovered in New Mexican Oligocene deposits, so this epoch of time remains mysterious to paleontologists. Nevertheless, the Datil Formation of New Mexico preserves one of only seven Oligocene fossil tracksites in the western United States. From the Miocene to Pliocene New Mexico was home to creatures such as four-tusked relatives of modern elephants. Other inhabitants included an abundance of beavers, three-toed horses, and rhinoceroses. Trees growing in New Mexico have been preserved as petrified wood, some specimens have opalized into a gem-like substance. As the Cenozoic proceeded, the local climate began to cool. During the Quaternary period, the Rio Grande became the most prominent local river system. During the Pleistocene epoch, large trees, probably pines, were preserved as impressions left in ancient San Jose Valley lava flows. The state's fauna included at least 65 kinds of birds, 2 reptiles, and 43 mammals. At this time the state was home to camels and mammoths. American mastodon remains were found on the east slope of the Sandia Mountains at an elevation of 8,470 feet, the highest ever recorded for the species. Many Pleistocene fossils were preserved in local caves.

== History ==
=== Indigenous interpretations ===
The Jicarilla Apaches in southern New Mexico told a myth about the origin of fire that also served to explain the existence of petrified wood. They believed that in the beginning, trees were all fireproof. However, Coyote ran around the world with a torch tied to his tail. As he ran his used his tail to start raging fires all over the world. Trees Coyote accidentally missed remained stone-like and fireproof, but the ignited trees can be used by modern people to light fires. This story likely derives from astonishment at petrified wood's obvious woody nature yet seemingly supernatural ability to resist being burnt like unfossilized wood.

The Jicarilla had another fossil-derived legend about the predatory monsters Giant Elk and Giant Eagle. Early in history, these predatory creatures killed many men, women, and children. A brave young man named Jonayaiyin decided to hunt these monsters down. He traveled far to the south, where he found the Giant Elk. He succeeded in killing it and took one of its horns to use as a weapon. He traveled to the west where the giant eagle lived high up on a ledge. The giant Eagle grabbed him in her claws and carried him to her nest. When the Giant Eagles returned, Jonayaiyin used the horn of the Giant Elk to club the Eagles to death. After falling to the earth, pieces of the male Giant Eagle's wing were said to remain at Taos.

=== Scientific research ===
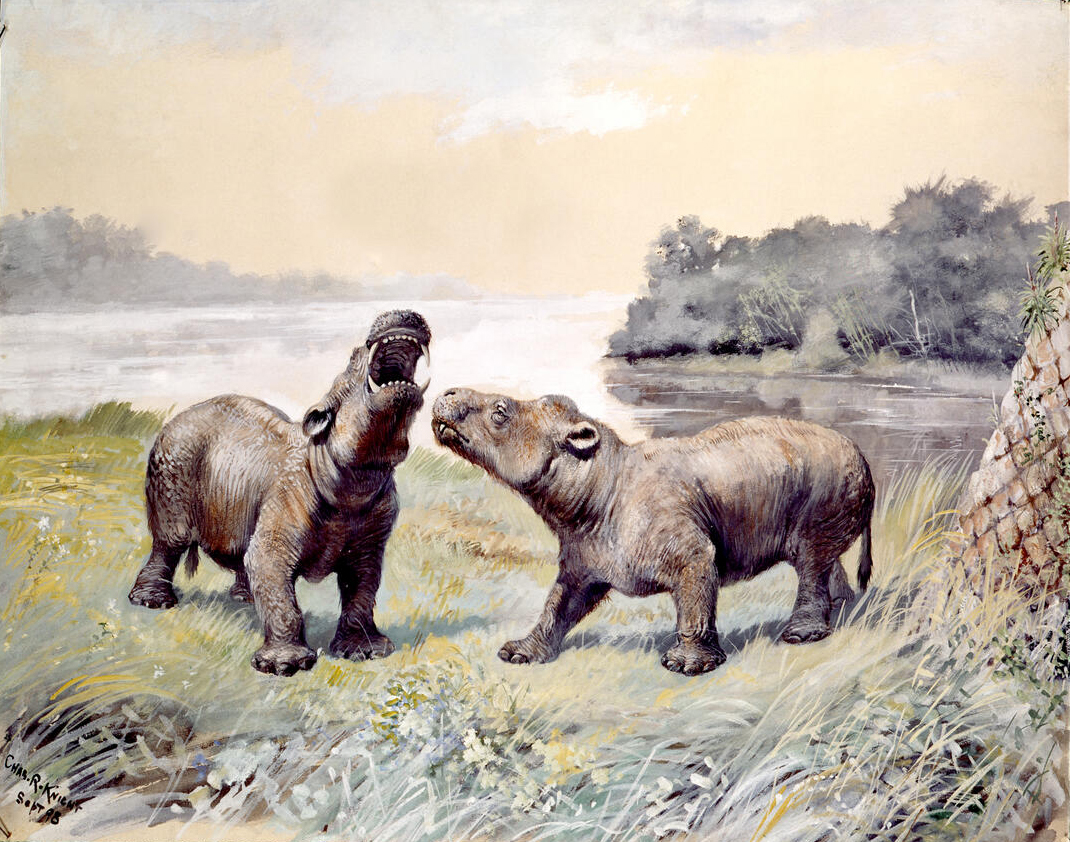
Coryphodon restoration by Charles R. Knight.

The first record of fossils in New Mexico was written by Santa Fe Trader Josiah Gregg, who described local petrified wood in his 1846 book Commerce of the Prairies . The next mention comes from J. W. Abert, who traveled through the area between 1846 and 1847. While there he wrote about fossils including petrified wood, shark teeth, shells and bones. His writings were incorporated into an 1848 Congressional Document by J. W. Bailey. Between 1853 and 1856 preparations for the construction of the transcontinental railroad had geologists in the area. While there they wrote about the local fossils they found. They sent some to New York hoping that Albany resident James Hall would be able to identify them. Around this time more and more prominent paleontologists became involved in New Mexico paleontology. Joseph Leidy described the new mastodon Mastodon obscurus from New Mexican bones he received. Edward Drinker Cope became so involved that he wrote 66 papers on New Mexican fossils between 1871 and 1893.

In 1874 Cope arrived at New Mexico accompanying the G. M. Wheeler Survey. While in the area he found the first known Eocene mammal from the southwestern United States, Coryphodon. Other discoveries Cope made during his stay included camels, crocodiles, deer, dogs, horses, and mastodon remains. In total he discovered about 90 species. This was a major boon to his reputation as his research was foundational to understanding that interval of American geologic history. The Puerco Formation was discovered in 1875 but significant numbers of fossils were not described until David Baldwin's 1881 expedition on behalf of Edward Drinker Cope. The American Museum of Natural History sent in several paleontologists in 1892 to uncover more fossils and the area became regarded as one of the best sources of Paleocene fossils in the world. In 1877 the lengthy official report of the Wheeler Survey of New Mexico was published. Cope wrote the report's coverage of fossil vertebrates, while invertebrates were covered by Charles A. White. In 1878 and 1879 the United States Geological Survey documented New Mexican Carboniferous invertebrates from places such as Mora Creek, Ferdinand Creek, Taos Peak, Cebolla, Manuellitos Creek, Coyote Creek, and Black Lake.

In 1913, the Carnegie Institution published a report on New Mexico's Carboniferous and Permian life. In 1928, three boys discovered a completely articulated partial mummy of the ground sloth Nothrotherium shasetnse 100 feet below the surface of Aden Crater southwest of Las Cruces. In 1936 R. V. Witter and his wife were collecting fossils in Santa Fe County on behalf of the Agassiz Museum at Harvard. At a small stream roughly 16 miles south of Lamy, the couple noticed some fragments of fossil amphibian bones. Traveling upstream to the source of the bones, the couple discovered a nearly solid mass of Triassic amphibian skeletons. In 1937 a crew working on road construction in Black Water Draw uncovered mammoth and bison remains associated with human artifacts.

In 1938 they returned to excavate the fossils. They determined that the deposit preserving the amphibians was roughly fifty feet wide and extended a significant distance back into the hills. They successfully excavated about 100 individual amphibians from the deposit, which might have preserved the remains of thousands. Among the specimens were about 50 skulls many individual bones from their limbs and vertebral columns as well as armored plates that would protected the amphibians' shoulder region in life. The find is especially important because Triassic amphibian fossils are rare in North America. The block of rock preserving the specimen was 6 feet by 8 feet. To protect the fragile fossils the block was given a cast made of 600 pounds of plaster, which was reinforced with iron, wood, and burlap until it weighed more than a ton. The excavators had to use jacks to lift and turn it. Along with that massive block the team also took many smaller blocks as well. Alfred Sherwood Romer has speculated that this exceptional amphibian bone bed may have formed when the amphibians were concentrated into smaller and smaller areas as a drought gradually dried up the pools of water.

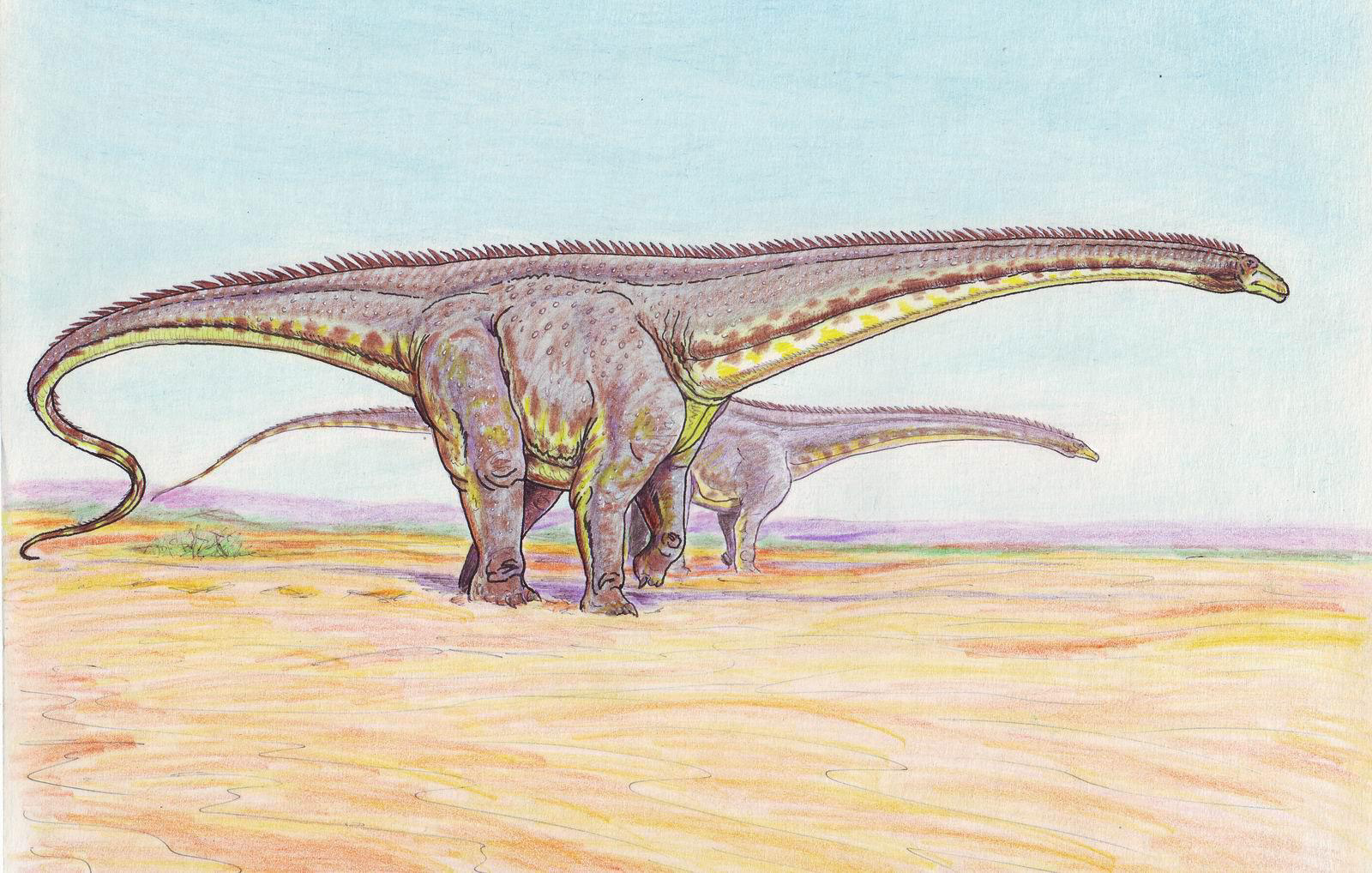
Diplodocus.

In 1947, an American Museum field party led by Edwin Harris Colbert discovered a bonebed including the skeletons of more than 1,000 Coelophysis at Ghost Ranch. Later, in 1953 University of New Mexico graduate student William Chenoweth discovered three important sites where dinosaurs were preserved in Morrison Formation rocks. He found a fragmentary Allosaurus, sauropods, and Stegosaurus. Three years later, in 1956, mastodon teeth were discovered by a nine-year-old boy who was out hunting for Indian arrowheads. These well preserved teeth are now curated by the University of New Mexico Museum. During the 1960s, uranium prospector Rodney Peterson discovered a new fossil site west of Albuquerque. Actual paleontological excavation at the site would be several decades away, however.

In 1979, two hikers discovered a series of gigantic articulated vertebrae fossils near San Ysidro. They reported the remains to David Gilette of the New Mexico Museum of Natural History. Gillette led an expedition into the region and used cutting-edge technology to locate the remains while they were still entombed in sandstone. The team excavated a massive quarry and gradually recovered a significant portion of the rear half of a diplodocid sauropod dinosaur. In 1991 this dinosaur was formally described as the new genus Seismosaurus and estimated to be the longest dinosaur known to science at 52 meters (171 feet) long. In 1989, excavation began at the fossils site Rodney Peterson discovered near Albuquerque. Fossils recovered included a huge allosaurid that may be referrable to the genus Saurophaganax, Camarasaurus, and the skull and teeth of a diplodocid. This was the first major quarry in New Mexico to preserve a significant number of bones from a variety of dinosaur species. During the early 80s, another partial sauropod skeleton was discovered near San Ysidro. The remains were thought to belong to the species Camarasaurus supremus. Prior to these discoveries most dinosaur fossils discovered in New Mexico were scrappy remains uncovered serenipitously by mining operations and surveys for uranium. More recently, in the 2000s, Seismosaurus was found to be the same as Diplodocus, a previously known dinosaur of similar age from the western United States.

== Natural history museums ==
- Eastern New Mexico University Natural History Museum, Eastern New Mexico University, Portales
- Las Cruces Museum of Natural History, Las Cruces
- Mesalands Community College's Dinosaur Museum, Tucumcari
- Miles Mineral Museum, Portales
- New Mexico Bureau of Geology and Mineral Resources Museum, Socorro
- New Mexico Museum of Natural History and Science, Albuquerque
- Ruth Hall Museum of Paleontology, Abiquiú
- Sherman Dugan Museum of Geology, Farmington
- Zuhl Museum, New Mexico State University, Las Cruces

== See also ==
- Paleontology in Arizona
- Paleontology in Colorado
- Paleontology in Oklahoma
- Paleontology in Texas
- Paleontology in Utah
