= Tererro Formation =

Geologic formation in New Mexico, US

- Stratigraphic range: Visean–Serpukhovian
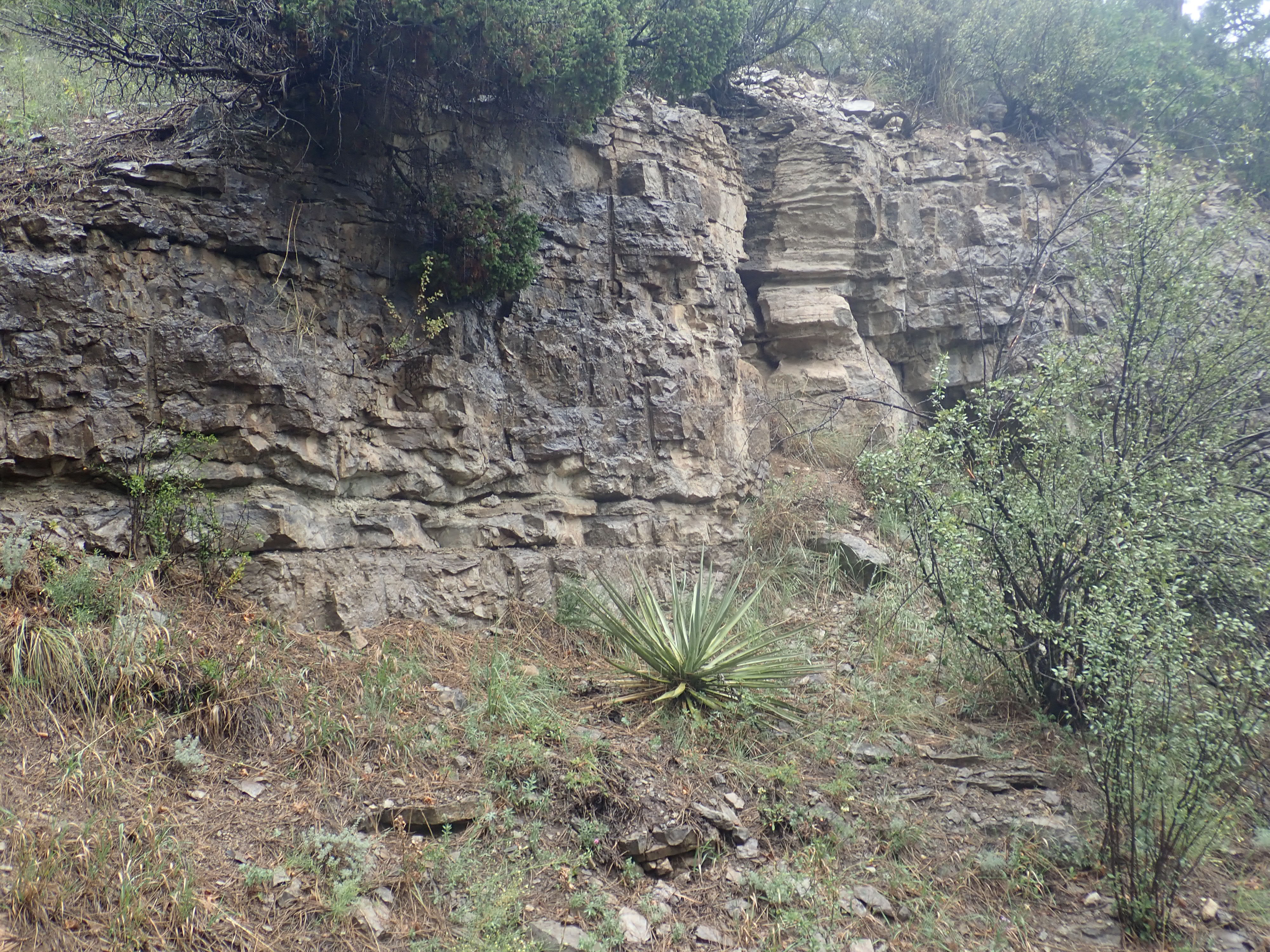
- Tererro Formation near its type section
- Type: Formation
- Unit of: Arroyo Penasco Group
- Sub-units: Macho Member, Manuelitas Member, Cowles Member
- Underlies: Sandia Formation
- Overlies: Espiritu Santo Formation
- Thickness: 130 ft (40 m)

Lithology
- Primary: Limestone
- Other: Sandstone, siltstone

Location
- Coordinates: 35.742°N 105.679°W
- Region: New Mexico
- Country: United States

Type section
- Named for: Tererro, New Mexico
- Named by: Baltz and Read
- Year defined: 1960
- Tererro Formation (the United States) Tererro Formation (New Mexico)

The Tererro Formation is a geologic formation in Sangre de Cristo Mountains of New Mexico. It preserves fossils dating back to the early Mississippian.

== Description ==
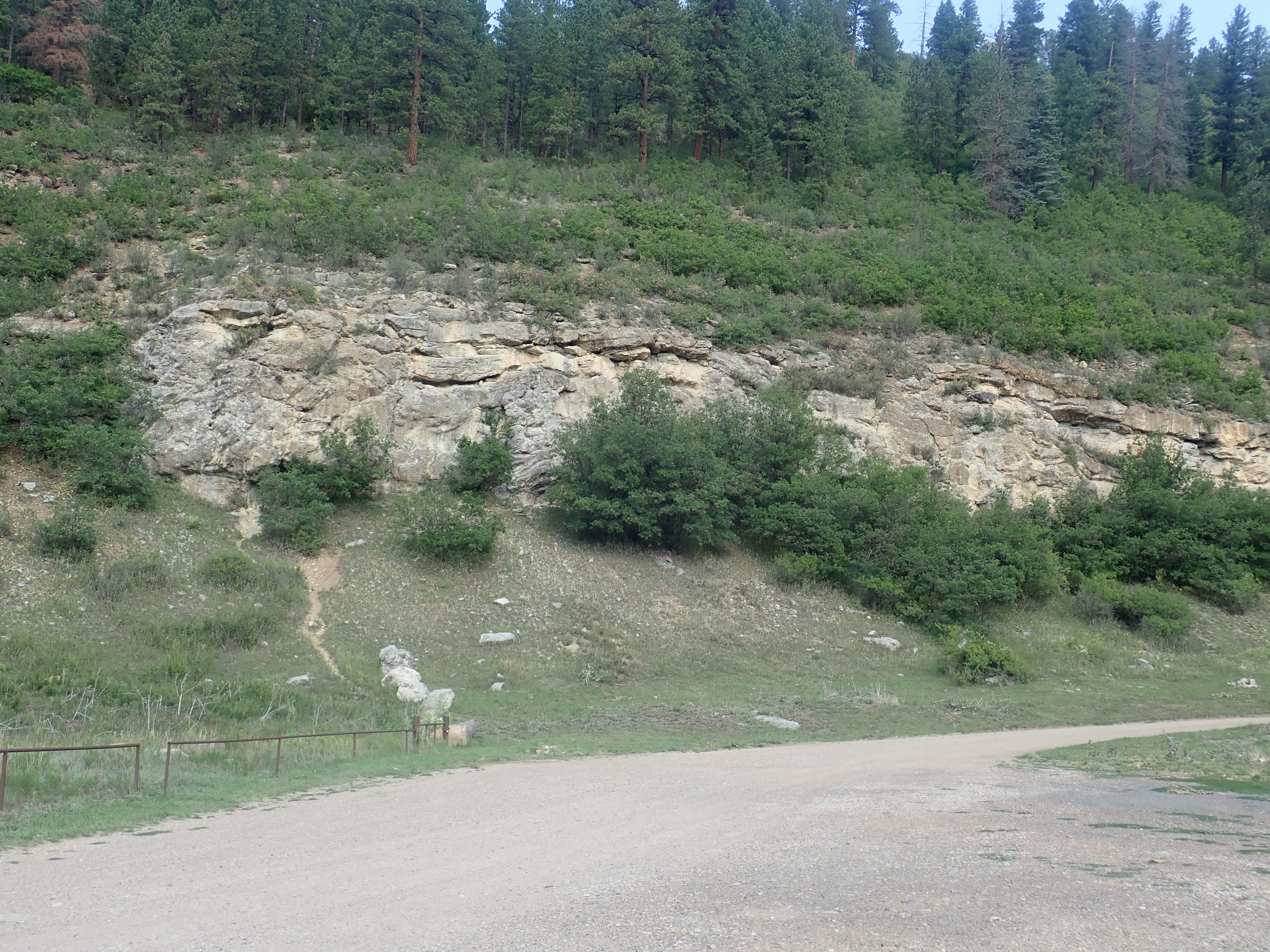
Tererro Formation a short distance north of its type section.

The formation is mostly crystalline or calcarenite limestone with a total thickness of up to 130 ft (40 m). It is exposed throughout the Sangre de Cristo Mountains and in the San Luis, Las Vegas-Raton, Palo Duro, and Estancia Basins, as well in the western Tusas Mountains and the Nacimiento Mountains. It lies unconformably on the Espiritu Santo Formation and is unconformably overlain by the Log Springs Formation in the Nacimiento Mountains, the Flechado Formation in the northern Sangre de Cristo Mountains, and the La Pasada Formation in the southern Sangre de Cristo Mountains.

The formation is divided into the Macho Member, which is a massive ledge-forming limestone breccia (thickness 30 feet (9.1 m)); the Turquillo Member, a thick-bedded mudstone; the Manuelitas Member, which is a light to medium gray calcarenite, limestone-pebble conglomerate, and finely crystallized locally cherty limestone (thickness 39 feet (12 m)); and the Cowles Member, which is a light yellow gray to olive yellow cross-bedded silty calcarenite (thickness 50 feet (15 m).

== Fossils ==
The Manuelitas Member contains fossils of the foraminiferan Endothyra sp. of Meramecian (Visean) age. The Macho, Turquillo, and Manuelitas Members contain microfossils characteristic of the Meramecian while the Cowles Member contains microfossils characteristic of the Chesterian (late Visean and Serpukhovian).

== History of investigation ==
The formation was first defined by Baltz and Read in 1960. Armstrong and Mamet included it as the upper formation of their Arroyo Penasco Group in 1974 and added the Turquillo Member.

== See also ==
- List of fossiliferous stratigraphic units in New Mexico
- Paleontology in New Mexico
