= Los Pinos Mountains =

Mountain range in the central part of New Mexico, United States

Coordinates: 34.333°N 106.586°W

The Los Pinos Mountains are a small mountain range in the central part of New Mexico, US. They are the southernmost part of a mountain front, running north to south, that also includes the Sandia Mountains and the Manzano Mountains. The Los Pinos Mountains are separated from the Manzano Mountains by Abo Pass, which was cut by a small tributary to the Rio Grande. The mountains run slightly west of south for 15 miles (24 km) and widen to a maximum of about 4 miles (6.4 km) across before narrowing again. The southern end of the range is ill-defined, being marked by cuestas that merge into badlands to the south.

The mountains are steep on their westward faces, where they rise 2,000 feet (610 m) over the Rio Grande Valley, but slope more gently to the east. There are five peaks over 7,000 feet (2,100 m) in elevation, of which the highest is Whiteface Mountain at 7,530 feet (2,300 m).

Most of the range falls within Sevilleta National Wildlife Refuge.

== Geology ==
The Los Pinos Mountains consist of a western ridge of Precambrian rock exposed by erosion. To the east and south, cuestas preserve Paleozoic sedimentary beds. The steep western face is interpreted as a normal fault, while a ridge paralleling the eastern limits of the mountains is a product of thrust faulting.

=== Stratigraphy ===
Formations present in the Los Pinos Mountains, in stratigraphic order, include:

Permian:
- Yeso Group
- Abo Formation
Pennsylvanian:
- Madera Group
- Sandia Formation
Precambrian:
- Blue Springs Schist
- Sais Quartzite
- Estadio Schist
- White Ridge Quartzite
- Abajo Formation
- Sevilleta Rhyolite

These are mostly located on the east and south. The western side of the range is underlain by the Los Pinos pluton, dated at 1655 ± 3 million years old.
