= Blue Springs Formation =

Geologic formation in New Mexico, US

- Stratigraphic range: Calymmian
- Type: Formation
- Unit of: Manzano Group
- Overlies: Sais Quartzite
- Thickness: 4,000 feet (1,200 m)

Lithology
- Primary: Schist
- Other: Slate, siltstone

Location
- Coordinates: 34.423°N 106.518°W
- Region: New Mexico
- Country: United States

Type section
- Named for: Blue Springs
- Named by: J.T. Stark and E.C. Dapples
- Year defined: 1946
- Blue Springs Formation (the United States) Blue Springs Formation (New Mexico)

The Blue Springs Formation is a geologic formation exposed in the Los Pinos Mountains of central New Mexico.

== Description ==
The formation consists of almost 4,000 feet (1,200 m) of metasedimentary rock. The lower beds are massive gray to red slate and siltstone, while the central portion mostly is greenish sericite schist with occasional slate and siltstone beds. The uppermost beds are again red to gray slate. The formation is underlain by the Sais Quartzite and overlain by Phanerozoic units. The middle schist is interpreted as a metarhyolite (a metamorphosed rhyolite).

The crystallization age of the formation is placed at 1588 ± 7 million years (Ma), corresponding to the earliest Calymmian period of the Mesoproterozoic.

== History of investigation ==
The formation was originally described as the Blue Springs schist by J.T. Stark and E.C. Dapples in 1946 and named for Blue Springs, a seepage area just north of Highway 60. The formation was first assigned to the Manzano Group in 2006.

== See also ==
- List of fossiliferous stratigraphic units in New Mexico
- Paleontology in New Mexico
