= Porvenir Formation =

Geologic formation in New Mexico, United States

- Stratigraphic range: Middle Pennsylvanian
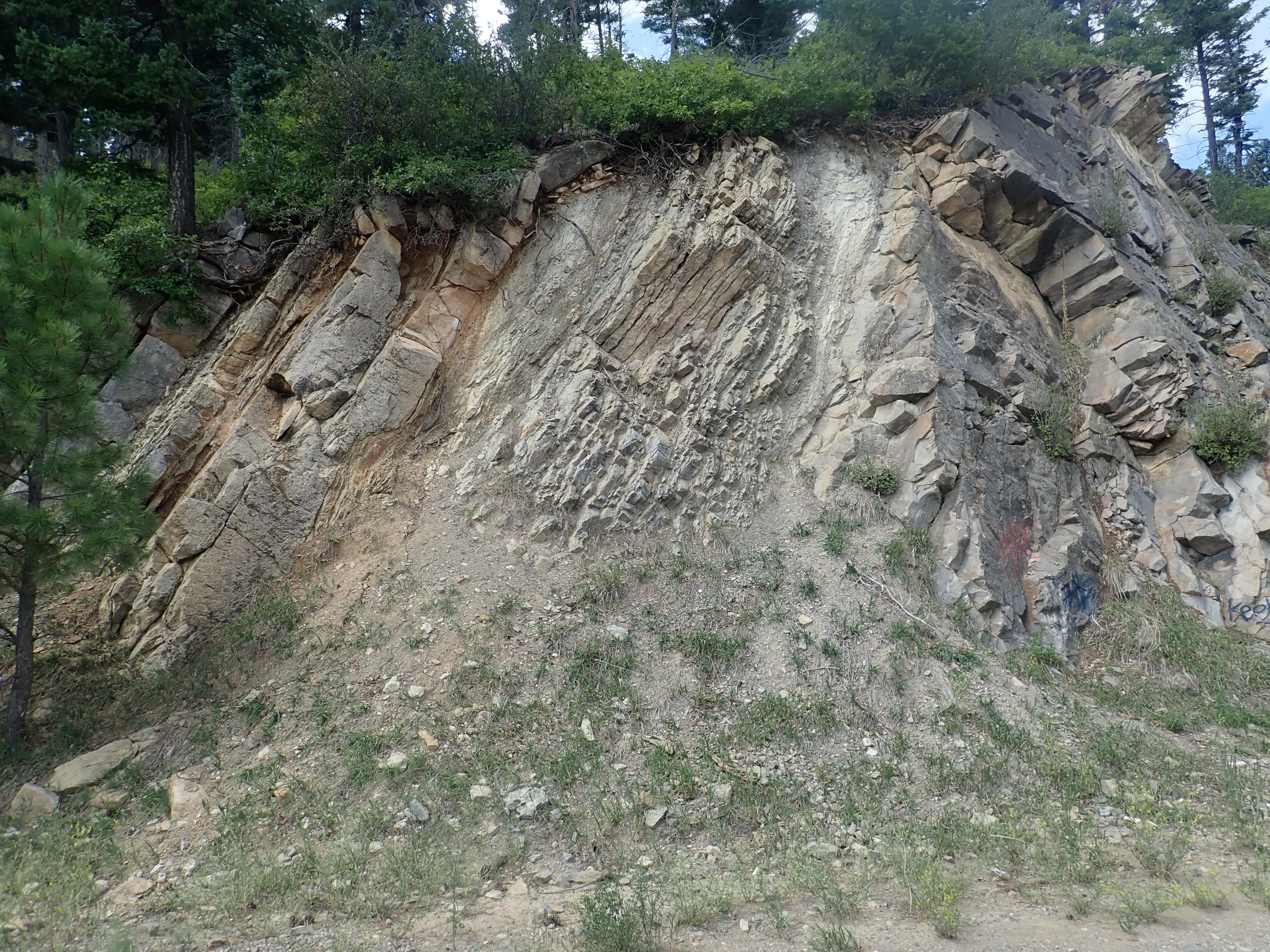
- Porvenir Formation at its type section at Canovas Canyon.
- Type: Formation
- Underlies: Alamitos Formation
- Overlies: Sandia Formation
- Thickness: 700–1,615 ft (213–492 m)

Lithology
- Primary: Limestone
- Other: Sandstone, shale

Location
- Coordinates: 35.704°N 105.405°W
- Region: New Mexico
- Country: United States

Type section
- Named for: El Porvenir Campground
- Named by: Baltz and Myers
- Year defined: 1984
- Porvenir Formation (the United States) Porvenir Formation (New Mexico)

The Porvenir Formation is a geologic formation exposed in the southeastern Sangre de Cristo Mountains of New Mexico. It preserves fossils dating back to the middle Pennsylvanian period.

== Description ==
The formation is mostly marine and can be divided into three intergrading facies. The first, located primarily to the south, is mostly limestone with some interbedded shale and sandstone. The second facies, located to the north and northwest, is mostly gray shale with some thick limestone and thin sandstone beds. The third facies, found to the northeast, is mostly shale, limestone (including sandy and oolitic limestone) and arkosic sandstone. Thickness is 700–1,615 feet (213–492 meters).

The formation rests conformably on the Sandia Formation and is disconformably overlain by the Alamitos Formation.

== Fossils ==
The formation contains fusulinids of Desmoinesian (Moscovian) age.

== History of investigation ==
The formation was first named by Baltz and Myers in 1984, who considered it correlative with the lower part of the Madera Formation. However, in 2004, Kues and Giles recommended restricting the Madera Group to shelf and marginal basin beds of Desmoinean (upper Moscovian) to early Virgilian age, which excluded the Porvenir Formation. Spencer G. Lucas and coinvestigators also exclude the Porvenir Formation from the Madera Group.

== See also ==
- List of fossiliferous stratigraphic units in New Mexico
- Paleontology in New Mexico
