= Bosque Peak =

Landform in Torrance County, New Mexico

- Location within New Mexico Location within the United States

Highest point
- Elevation: 9,613 ft (2,930 m)
- Prominence: 1370
- Isolation: 8.73 mi (14.05 km) to Gallo Peak
- Coordinates: 34°45′56″N 106°25′46″W

Geography
- Location: Torrance County, New Mexico, United States
- Topo map: USGS Bosque Peak

Geology
- Rock age: Upper Pennsylvanian to Lower Permian (323 to 272 Mya)
- Rock type(s): Madera Formation, upper arkosic unit

Climbing
- Easiest route: Hiking, Open Country

Bosque Peak is located on the western flank of the Manzano Mountains in Torrance County, New Mexico. Bosque Peak is within the Cibola National Forest and is ranked the 318th highest peak in New Mexico, and 101st by prominence.
