= Gallo Peak =

Landform in Torrance County, New Mexico

- Location within New Mexico Location within the United States

Highest point
- Elevation: 10,010 ft (3,050 m)
- Prominence: 323 ft (98 m)
- Isolation: 0.87 mi (1.40 km) to Peak 10057
- Coordinates: 34°38′14″N 106°26′19″W

Geography
- Location: Torrance County, New Mexico, United States
- Parent range: Manzano Mountains
- Topo map: USGS Capilla Peak

Geology
- Rock type: Sais Quartzite

Climbing
- Easiest route: Hiking, Open Country

Gallo Peak is located in the Manzano Mountains in Torrance County, New Mexico. Gallo Peak is in Cibola National Forest, and is ranked the 222nd highest peak in New Mexico.

Gallo Peak is 5 miles (8 km) due west of the town Manzano and can be accessed via the Red Canyon Road, then onto the Canyon and Crest trails.
