= Galisteo Pass =

Mountain pass in New Mexico, U.S.

The Galisteo Pass is a historic mountain pass in New Mexico in the United States.

== Location ==
The pass is located in the Manzano Mountains, near the Pecos Pueblo, New Mexico, USA.

== Historical significance ==
For Native Americans, the pass enabled them to travel from the pueblos to the Southern Plains. It acted as a trading route for them.

In the 1590s, Spanish conquistador Juan de Oñate went through the pass.

During the Mexican–American War of 1846–1848, General Manuel Armijo went through the pass.
