= Manzano Group =

Group of geologic formations in New Mexico, US

- Stratigraphic range: Statherian
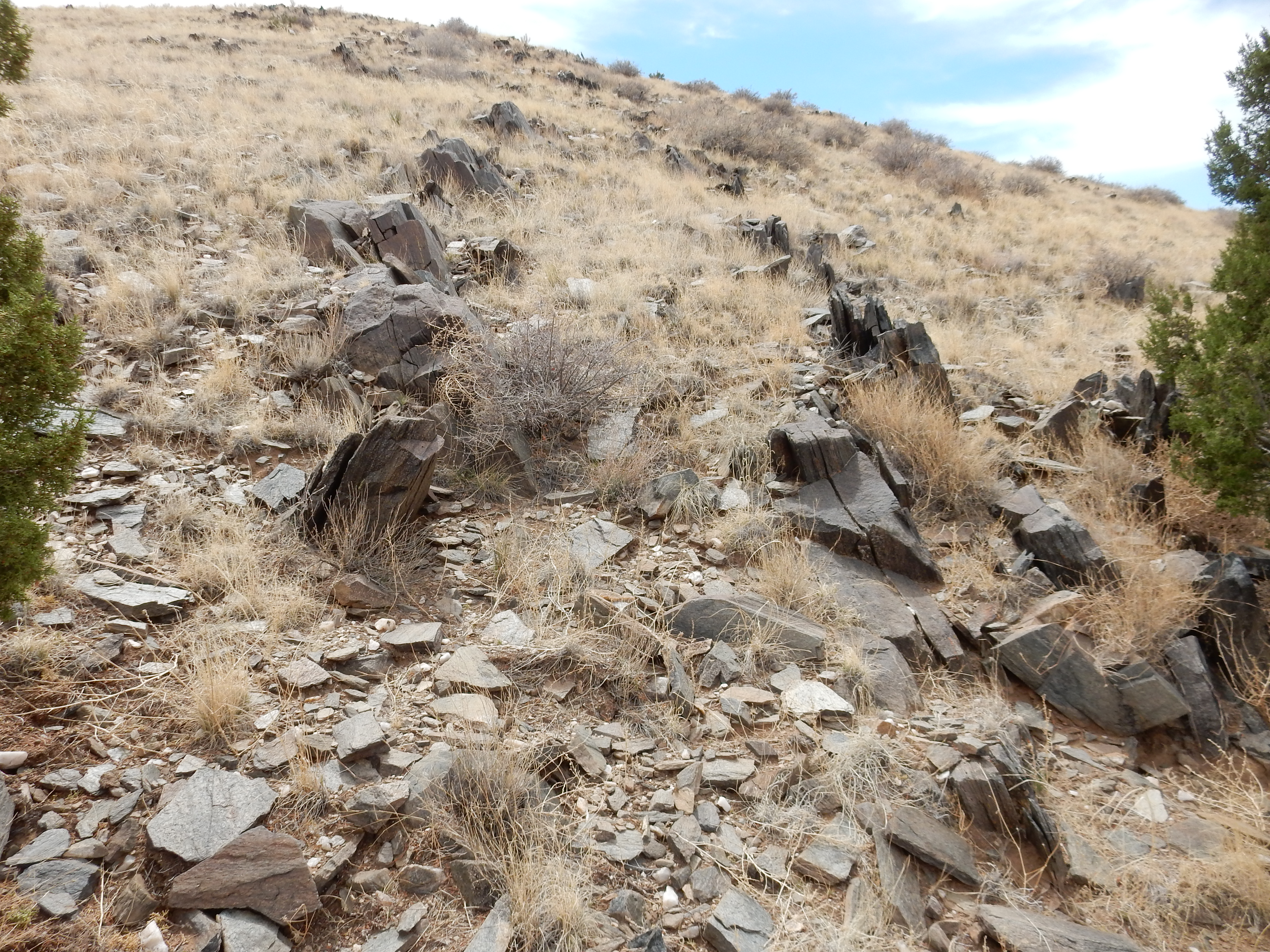
- Outcrops of Manzano Group (Sevilleta Metarhyolite) west of Abo Pass, New Mexico, US
- Type: Group
- Sub-units: Blue Springs Formation; Sais Quartzite; Estadio Schist; White Ridge Quartzite; Abajo Formation; Sevilleta Metarhyolite; Bootleg Canyon Sequence; Tijeras Greenstone
- Thickness: 2,700 meters (8,900 ft)

Lithology
- Primary: Metarhyolite, quartzite
- Other: Schist, amphibolite

Location
- Coordinates: 34.33°N 106.59°W
- Region: New Mexico
- Country: United States

Type section
- Named for: Manzano Mountains
- Named by: A. Luther
- Year defined: 2006
- Manzano Group (the United States) Manzano Group (New Mexico)

The Manzano Group is a group of geologic formations in central New Mexico. These have radiometric ages of 1601 to 1662 million years (Ma), corresponding to the late Statherian period of the Paleoproterozoic.

The name Manzano Group was previously applied to a group of sedimentary formations of Permian age in roughly the same geographical area. The original Manzano Group was historically important in the establishment of the paleontological time scale of the Permian period in western North America. However, the name was abandoned after 1920.

== Description ==
The group consists of Statherian lithostratigraphic units exposed in the Los Pinos Mountains and nearby ranges of central New Mexico. These are mostly metarhyolite or quartzite units with some schist and amphibolite, and form a sequence in excess of 2,700 meters (8,900 ft) thick. The group records deformation attributed to the Mazatzal orogeny, and the quartzites of the group may be the provenance of the lower conglomerates of the Marquenas Formation to the north, which was previously problematic. Study of the group also provides evidence in favor of the hypothesis that the Mazatzal Province was formed by continental arc volcanism from Yavapai crust. The group was subsequently severely folded and intruded by magma bodies during the Picuris orogeny.

=== Stratigraphy ===
The group is best exposed in an overturned syncline in the Los Pinos Mountains. Here the stratigraphy is:

Blue Springs Formation (youngest)
Sais Quartzite
Estadio Schist
White Ridge Quartzite
Abajo Formation
Sevilleta Metarhyolite
Bootleg Canyon Sequence
Tijeras Greenstone

The Estadio Schist is a garnet + staurolite + biotite schist, described as a marker bed separating the Sais Quartzite from the White Ridge Quartzite.

== History of investigation ==
The Manzano Series was first named by Herrick in 1900. Herrick correctly placed the Carboniferous - Permian boundary just below the base of this unit and identified Permian fossils in overlying beds, but could find no fossils within the series itself. Gordon assigned the underlying beds to the (now-abandoned) Magdalena Group and added the overlying limestone beds now assigned to the San Andres Formation, and placed the Manzano Group in the upper Carboniferous based on fossils reported by Lee and Girty. The name continued in use at least as late as 1920, when Boese concluded from ammonite fossils that the Abo Formation was Uralian (Cisuralian?) in age. This placed the fossils in the upper Pennsylvanian as defined in western North America at that time, and Boese recommended abandonment, or at least heavy revision, of the Manzano Group.

The modern units corresponding to the original Manzano Group are (in ascending stratigraphic order) the Bursum Formation, Abo Formation, Yeso Formation, Glorieta Sandstone, and San Andres Formation. The Yeso Formation has itself been promoted to group rank, though this has not been universally accepted.

The name Manzano Group was revived in 2006 to refer to latest Statherian formations in the Manzano Mountains, a usage that has since become more widely adopted.

== See also ==
- List of fossiliferous stratigraphic units in New Mexico
- Paleontology in New Mexico
