= Abajo =

Abajo may refer to:

- Abajo Formation, a geologic formation in New Mexico, US
- Abajo Mountains, a mountain range in Utah, US
- Abajo Peak, a mountain in Utah, US
- José Luis Abajo (born 1978), Spanish fencer
