= Kelly Limestone =

Geologic formation in New Mexico, United States

- Stratigraphic range: Tournaisian–Visean
- Type: Formation
- Sub-units: Ladron Member; Calosa Member
- Underlies: Sandia Formation
- Overlies: Basement rock
- Thickness: 30 m (98 ft)

Lithology
- Primary: Limestone

Location
- Coordinates: 34.090°N 107.196°W
- Region: New Mexico
- Country: United States

Type section
- Named for: Kelly, New Mexico
- Named by: C.L. Herrick
- Year defined: 1904
- Kelly Limestone (the United States) Kelly Limestone (New Mexico)

The Kelly Limestone is a geologic formation in New Mexico, United States. Its fossil assemblage is characteristic of the Early to Middle Mississippian.

== Description ==
The Kelly Limestone consists of approximately 30 meters (98 ft) of marine limestone. It is found in the Lemitar, Ladron, and Magdalena Mountains of west-central New Mexico, US. The formation rests on Precambrian basement rock and is overlain by the Sandia Formation. The Kelly Limestone is divided into a lower Calosa Member and an upper Ladron Member, which are separated by an unconformity.

The Kelly Limestone likely correlates with the Arroyo Penasco Group in northern New Mexico and the Leadville Limestone of Colorado. These were deposited in a major marine transgression (advance of the ocean across the continent) in the Mississippian.

== Fossil content ==
The formation contains fossil conodonts indicating that it ranges from Tournaisian to Visean (Early to Middle Mississippian) in age.

The lower Caloso Member contains fossils of the brachiopods Beecheria chouteauensis and Spirifer centronatus and the fusulinids Latiendothyra, Medioendothyra, and Tuberendothyra. The upper Ladron Member contains a diverse fossil assemblage, including brachiopods such as Rhipidomella and Linoproductus, blastoid echinoderms such as Pentremites conoideus, cnidarians such as Zaphriphyllum casteri, and numerous species of microscopic algae and foraminiferans.

== Economic resources ==
The Kelly Limestone was the principal ore-bearing formation of the historic Magdalena, New Mexico mining district. The ore takes the form of replacement deposits in the limestone produced by nearby igneous intrusions. The best ore was found in the so-called "silver pipes" beds, which were dense dolomitic limestone contrasting with the high-calcium limestone making up most of the rest of the formation.

== History of investigation ==
The formation was first named as the Graphic-Kelly Formation by C.L. Herrick in 1904 for exposures near the mining town of Kelly, New Mexico. The hyphenated name was found objectionable, and the formation was renamed as the Kelly Limestone by C.H. Gordon in 1907. In 1976, A.K. Armstrong and B.L. Mamet divided the formation into the Caloso and Ladron Members.

== See also ==
- List of fossiliferous stratigraphic units in New Mexico
- Paleontology in New Mexico
