= White Ridge Quartzite =

Geologic formation in New Mexico, US

- Stratigraphic range: Statherian
- Type: Formation
- Unit of: Manzano Group
- Underlies: Estadio Schist
- Overlies: Abajo Formation
- Thickness: 4,500 ft (1,400 m)

Lithology
- Primary: Quartzite
- Other: Schist

Location
- Coordinates: 34.383°N 106.540°W
- Region: Los Pinos Mountains, New Mexico
- Country: United States

Type section
- Named for: White Ridge
- Named by: Stark and Dapples
- Year defined: 1946
- White Ridge Quartzite (the United States) White Ridge Quartzite (New Mexico)

The White Ridge Quartzite is a geologic formation in central New Mexico. It has a maximum age of 1650 million years (Ma), corresponding to the Statherian period.

== History of investigation ==
The unit was first defined by Stark and Dapples in 1946, during their mapping of the Los Pinos Mountains, and named for White Ridge, a prominent ridge in the northeastern part of the mountains.

== Geology ==
The unit is a thick sequence of massive quartzite beds, white to reddish or tan in color, 2 to 7 feet (0.6 to 2 m) thick. There are also scattered beds of sericite schist that become more numerous in the uppermost part of the formation, where the quartzite beds thin to 1 to 2 feet (0.3 to 0.6 m) in thickness and the beds are reddened by hematite. The quartzite often contains significant sericite, biotite, and hematite. The total thickness of the formation is up to 3,700 feet (1,100 m). The beds dip steeply to the west, at a dip angle of 32 to 70 degrees. The formation overlies the Abajo Formation and in turn is overlain by the Estadio Schist.

Detrital zircon grains in the formation are almost identical in age and isotope composition to the underlying Sevilleta metarhyolite, suggesting that the sediments of the quartzite were weathered almost exclusively from local sources. The minimum zircon age is about 1650 Ma, and radiometric dating of underlying and overlying formations place the age of the White Ridge Quarzite between 1650 and 1588 Ma.
