= La Pasada Formation =

Geologic formation in New Mexico, US

- Stratigraphic range: Moscovian–Bashkirian
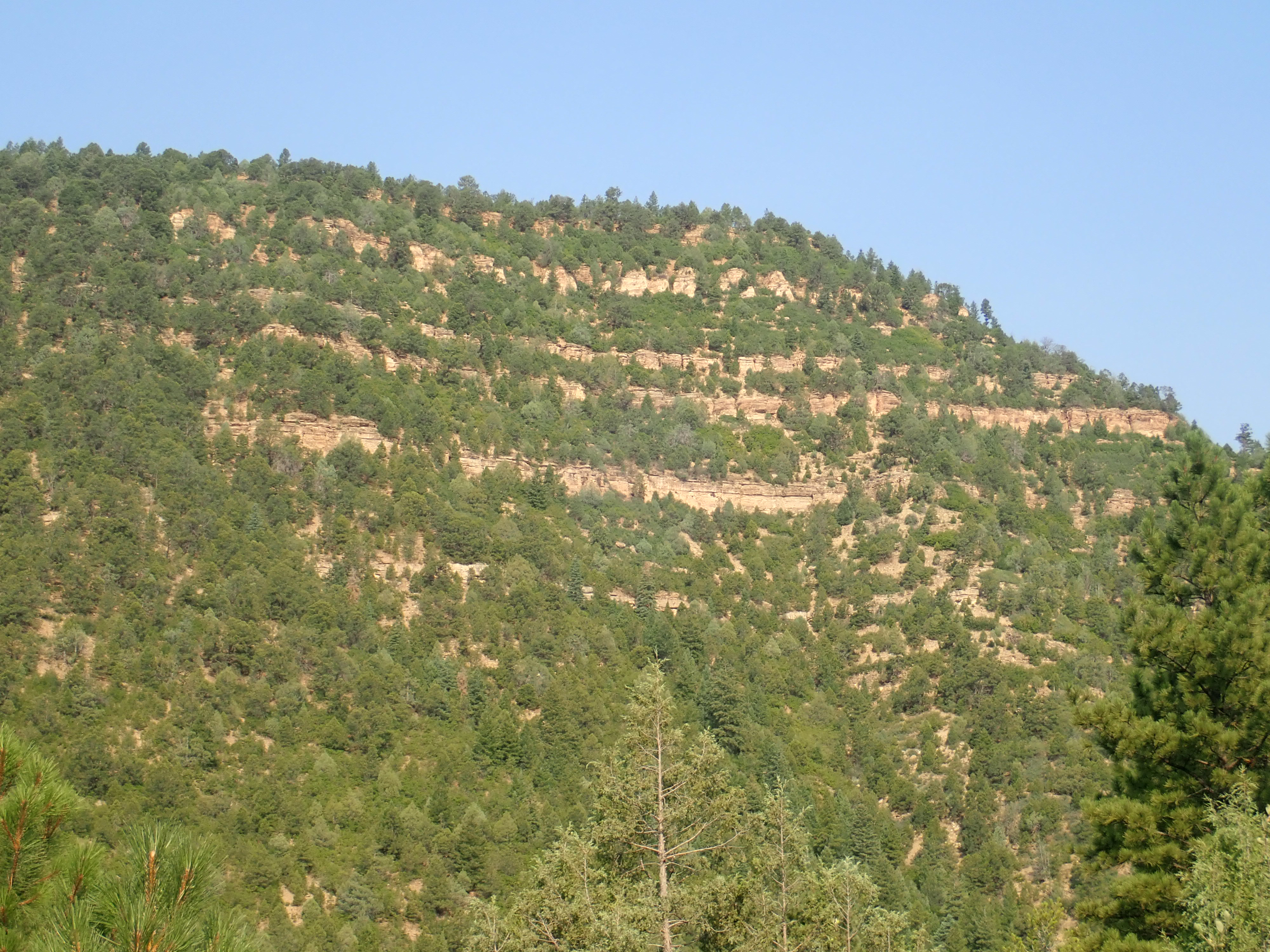
- La Pasada Formation at its type section at Dalton's Bluff
- Type: Formation
- Underlies: Alamitos Formation
- Overlies: Tererro Formation
- Thickness: 973 ft (297 m)

Lithology
- Primary: Limestone
- Other: Shale

Location
- Coordinates: 35.662°N 105.693°W
- Region: New Mexico
- Country: United States

Type section
- Named for: Upper La Pasada (abandoned Spanish settlement)
- Named by: P.K. Sutherland
- Year defined: 1963
- La Pasada Formation (the United States) La Pasada Formation (New Mexico)

The La Pasada Formation is a geologic formation in the southern Sangre de Cristo Mountains of New Mexico. It preserves fossils dating back to the early to middle Pennsylvanian.

== Description ==
The formation is a cyclic carbonate consisting of alternating limestone and shale with some thin sandstones. Total thickness is 973–1,002 ft (297–305 m). The formation is more clastic towards its base (50% shale and siltstone) than towards its upper portion (24% shale and siltstone). The shales are noncalcareous and greenish towards the base but become gray, calcareous, and often fossiliferous towards the upper portion. The formation shows considerable lateral variability, grading into the Flechado Formation to the north.

The lower half of the formation is interpreted as a shallow marine nearshore sequence with occasional nonmarine intervals with thin coal beds. The upper half was deposited under neritic offshore marine conditions with infrequent nonmarine intervals.

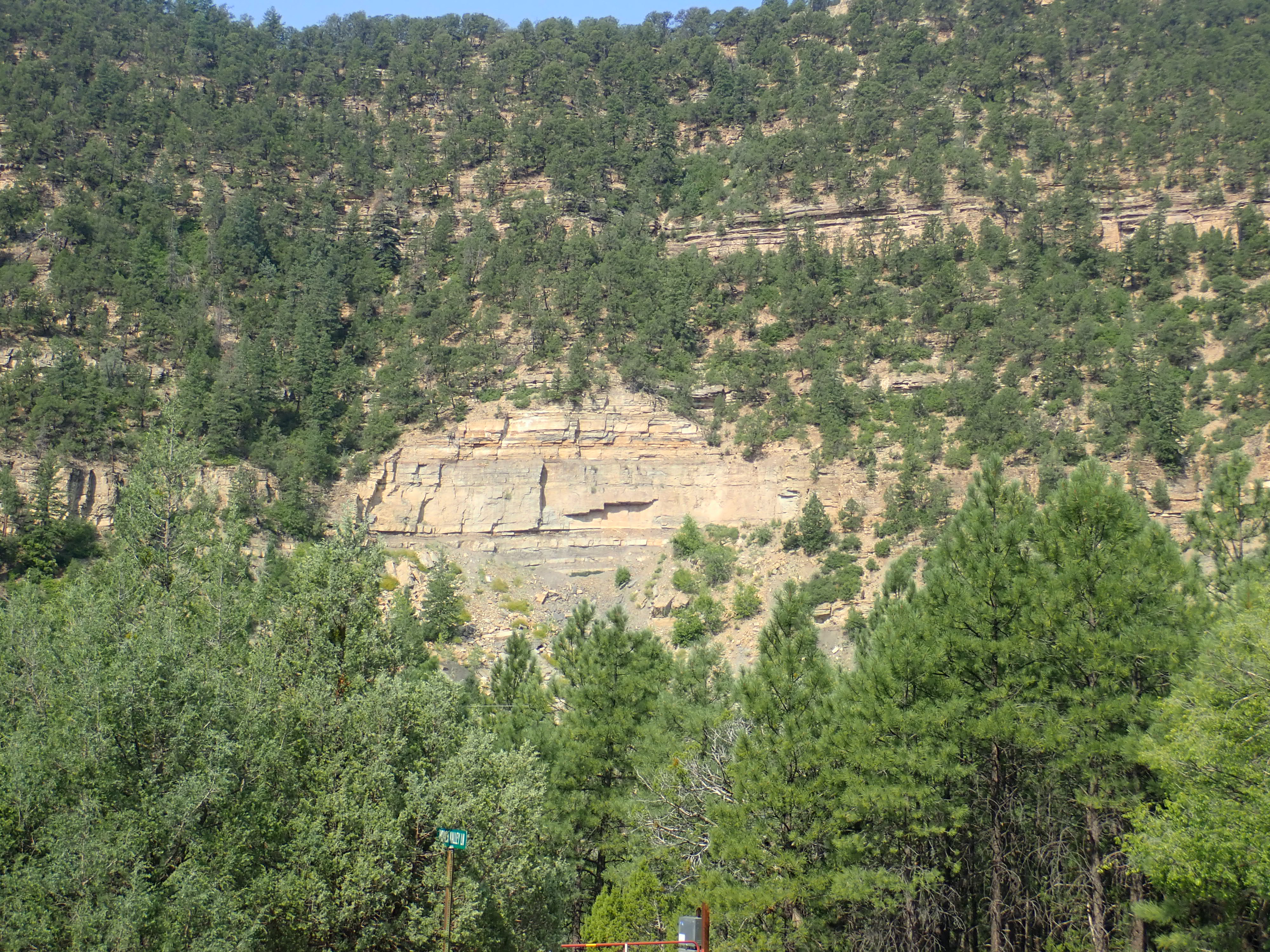
Massive limestone bed of La Pasada Formation at Dalton's Bluff.

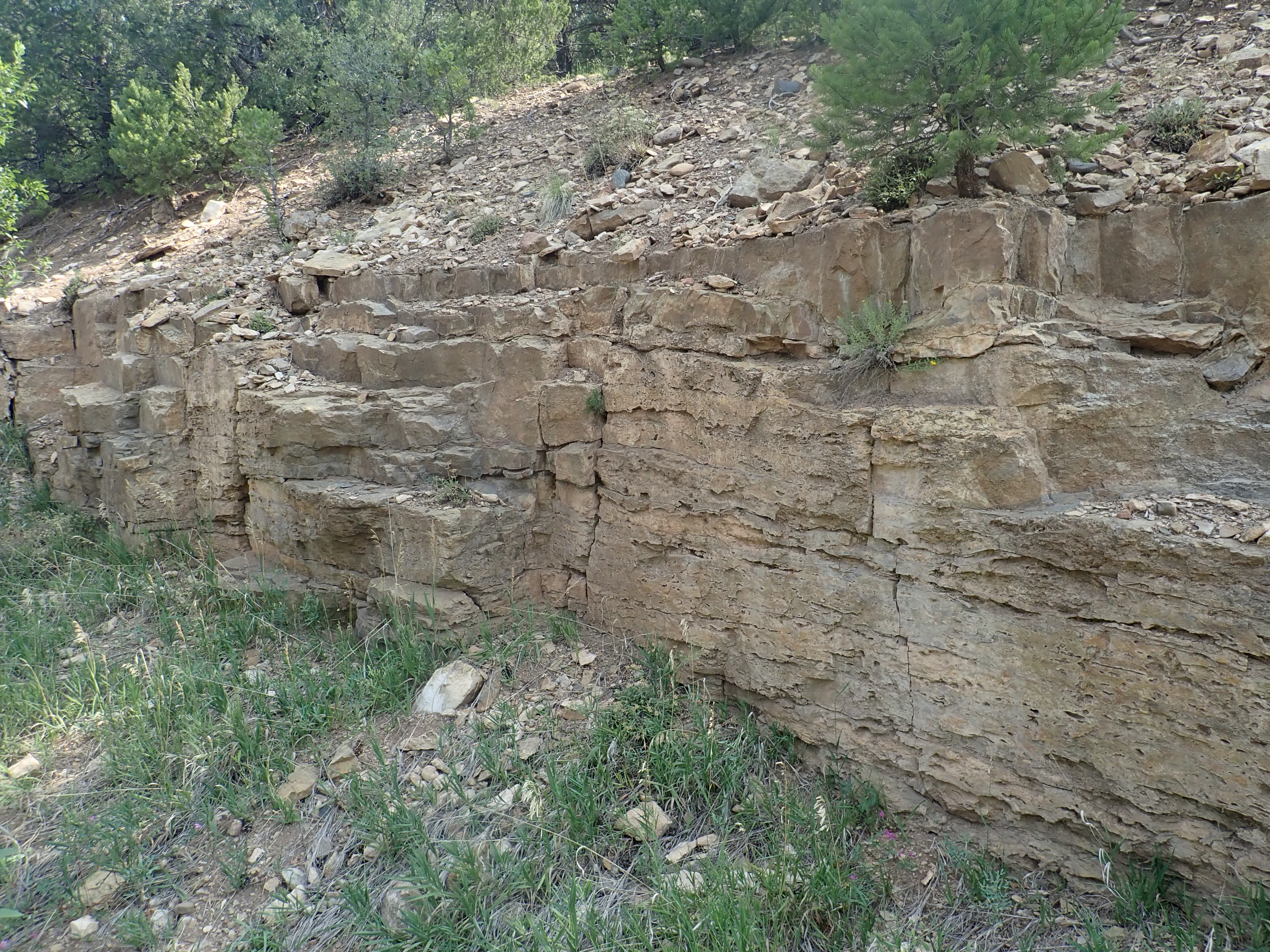
La Pasada Formation in road cut north of Pecos.

== Fossils ==
The formation contains abundant fossils of Mesolobus and other brachiopods, fenestrate bryozoans, crinoid fragments, and less common pectinid bivalves, as well as small numbers of trilobites, including Ditomopyge scitula and Ameura missouriensis.

== History of investigation ==
The formation was first defined in 1963 by Patrick K. Sutherland, who considered it correlative with the lower part of the Madera Formation. However, in 2004, Barry Kues and Katherine Giles recommended restricting the Madera Group to shelf and marginal basin beds of Desmoinean (upper Moscovian) to early Virgilian age, which excluded the La Pasada Formation. Spencer G. Lucas and coinvestigators also exclude the La Pasada Formation from the Madera Group.

== See also ==
- List of fossiliferous stratigraphic units in New Mexico
- Paleontology in New Mexico
