= Tijeras Greenstone =

Geologic formation in New Mexico, US

- Stratigraphic range: Statherian
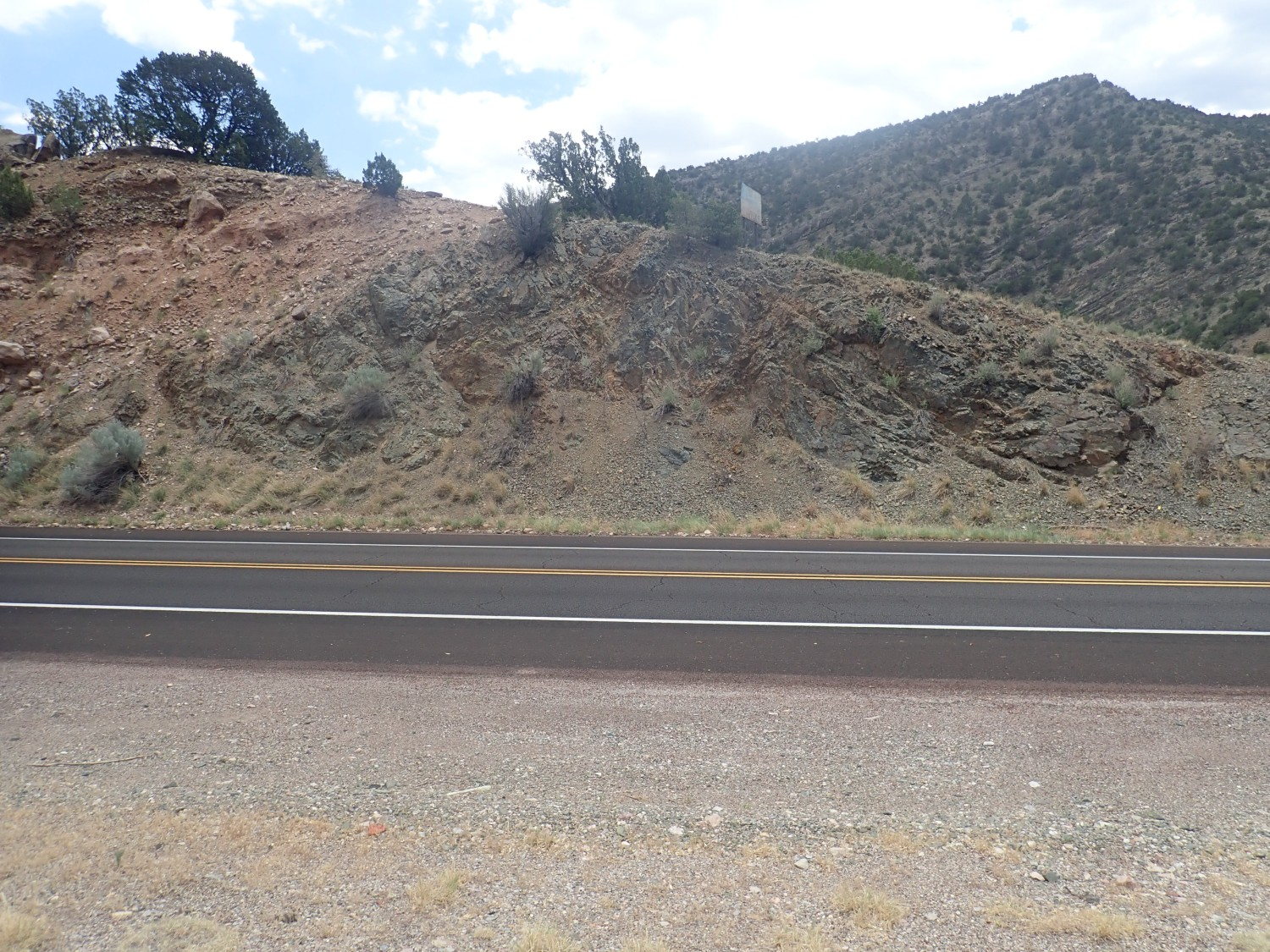
- Tijeras Greenschist along Old Highway 66 in Tijeras Canyon, New Mexico, US
- Type: Formation
- Unit of: Manzano Group
- Underlies: Bootleg Canyon Sequence

Lithology
- Primary: Greenschist

Location
- Coordinates: 35.080°N 106.407°W
- Region: Sandia Mountains, New Mexico
- Country: United States

Type section
- Named for: Tijeras Canyon
- Named by: Kelley and Northrop
- Year defined: 1975
- Tijeras Greenstone (the United States) Tijeras Greenstone (New Mexico)

The Tijeras Greenstone is a geologic formation in central New Mexico. It has a radiometric age of 1660 million years (Ma), corresponding to the Statherian period.

== History of investigation ==
The unit was first defined by V.C. Kelley and S.A. Northrop in 1975. The formation was included in the Manzano Group by Mark Holland and coinvestigators in 2020.

== Geology ==
The formation is exposed along a belt 1 mile (1.6 km) and 5.5 miles (8.9 km) long in Tijeras Canyon east of Albuquerque, New Mexico. It is a sequence of metavolcanic and metasedimentary beds, typically dark green in color, with its texture varying from unfoliated to strongly schistose. The dominant rock type is metabasalt of tholeiitic composition. The more foliated beds are chlorite or hornblende schist, but much of the formation is igneous rocks that have experienced only mild metamorphism. Metasedimentary rocks vary from quartzite through mica schist to marble, with one sequence of quartzite beds exceeding 610 meters (2,000 ft) in thickness. Metamorphic conditions reached 550±50 °C and 2±1 kb pressure, corresponding to a low-pressure amphibolite facies.
