= Zaphriphyllum =

Zaphriphyllum Temporal range: Devonian-Mississippian ~365–343 Ma

Scientific classification
- Domain: Eukaryota
- Kingdom: Animalia
- Phylum: Cnidaria
- Subphylum: Anthozoa
- Class: †Rugosa
- Order: †Stauriida
- Family: †Ekvasophyllidae
- Genus: †Zaphriphyllum; Sutherland 1954

Species
- See text

Extinct genus of coral

Zaphriphyllum is an extinct genus of horn coral belonging to the suborder Stariidae and family Ekvasophyllidae. Specimens have been found in Mississippian beds in North America and Turkey. It is the characteristic coral of the Kelly Limestone of New Mexico, US.

== Original description ==
Sutherland first described it in 1954 from a rock containing a fauna of the Middle Mississippian age in the Northern territory of Canada. Sutherland proposed the genus Zaphriphyllum for those zaphrentids which still possess a trochoid shape and pronounced cardinal fossula and consistently have dissepiments. These forms usually also show a tendency toward a radial arrangement of the septa in the immediate area of the cardinal fossula. Zaphriphyllum closely resembles Amplexizaphrentis Vaughan; except that, as Sutherland (personal communication) has pointed out, the latter is characterized by the absence, or very sparse and discontinuous development, of dissepiments.

== Species ==
- Z. casteri Armstrong 1958
- Z. daleki Denayer 2015
