= Flechado Formation =

Geologic formation in New Mexico, US

- Stratigraphic range: Moscovian
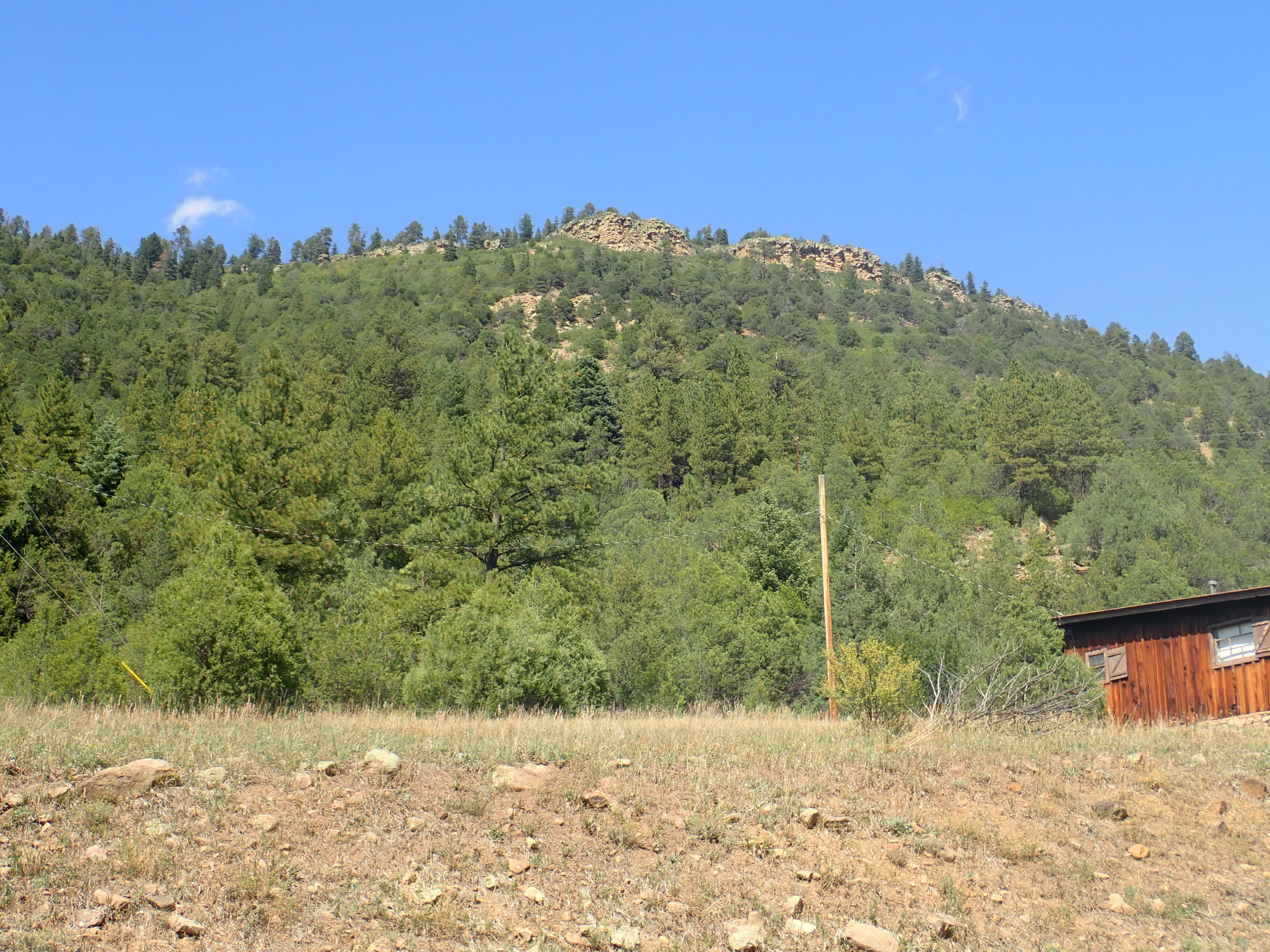
- Flechado Formation at its type section, Rio Pueblo Valley, New Mexico.
- Type: Formation
- Underlies: Alamitos Formation
- Overlies: Tererro Formation
- Thickness: 2,500 ft (760 m)

Lithology
- Primary: Sandstone, shale
- Other: Siltstone, limestone, conglomerate

Location
- Coordinates: 36.1623943°N 105.5786314°W
- Region: New Mexico
- Country: United States

Type section
- Named for: Flechado Creek
- Named by: P.K. Sutherland
- Year defined: 1963
- Flechado Formation (the United States) Flechado Formation (New Mexico)

The Flechado Formation is a geologic formation in the northern Sangre de Cristo Mountains of New Mexico. It preserves fossils dating back to the early to middle Pennsylvanian.

== Description ==
The Flechado Formation consists of low-feldspar sandstone and shale alternating with thin beds of limestone. The total thickness is 2,500 feet (760 meters). It overlies the Tererro Formation and is overlain by the Alamitos Formation. The formation is well to extremely well cemented in the type area, so that it can be difficult to distinguish from the Precambrian Ortega Formation.

The formation grades laterally into the La Pasada Formation to the south of the Rio Pueblo, with the clastic beds of the Flechado abruptly thinning and transitioning to carbonate beds of the La Pasada over a distance of about 5 miles (8.0 kilometres).

The terrigenous sediments of the Flechado Formation were likely derived from the southern part of Uncompahgre uplift during uplift on the west side of the Picuris-Pecos fault.

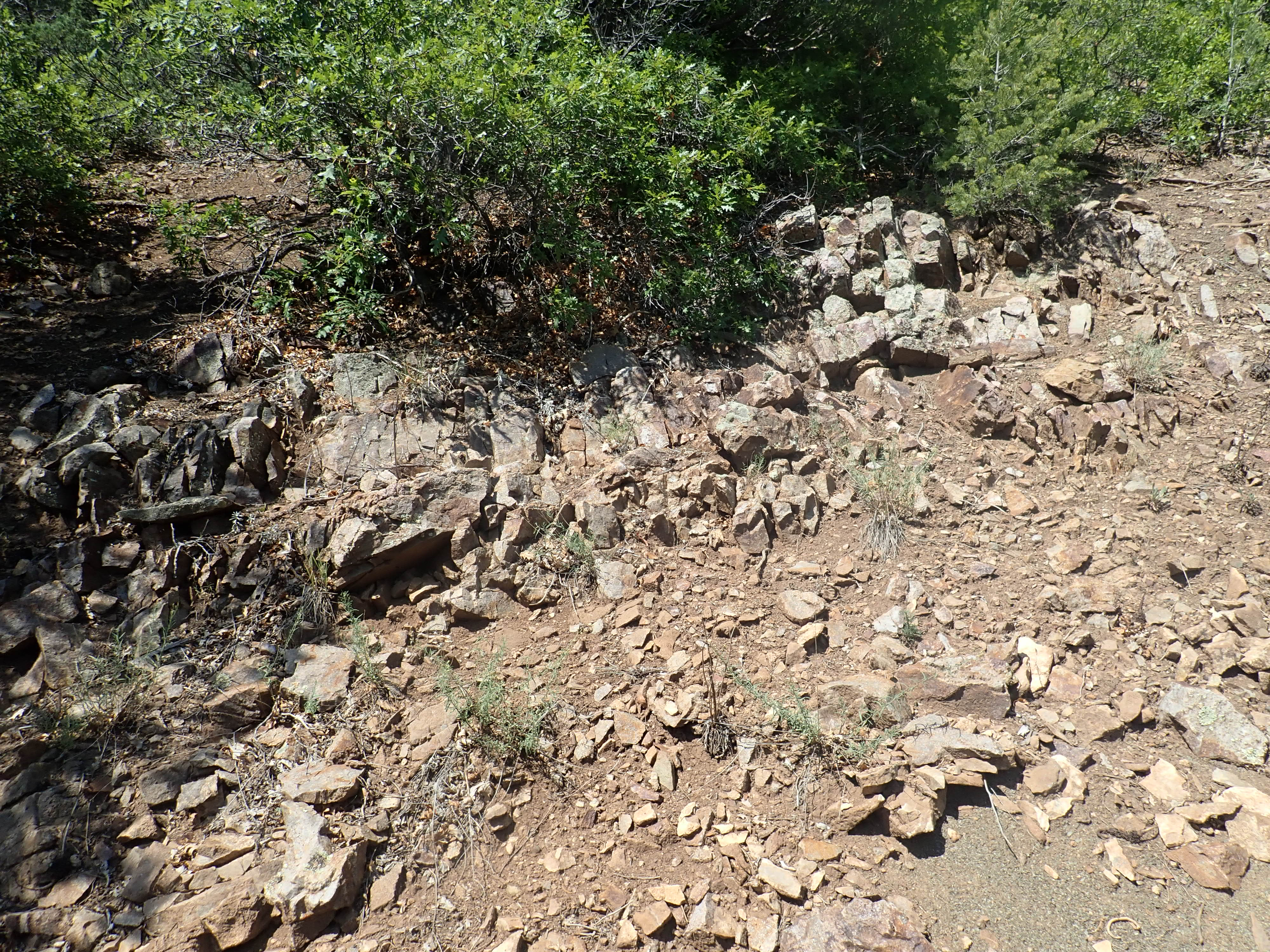
Close view of Flechado Formation at its type section.

== Fossils ==
Fossils are scarce in the upper portion of the Flechado Formation, but middle Desmoinesian (upper Moscovian) brachiopods are found about 800 feet (240 meters) below the top of the formation. Atokan (lower Moscovian) fusulinids and brachiopods are found in the lower part, which also contains broken crinoid, bryozoan, and algal remains.

== History of investigation ==
The formation was first described by P.K. Sutherland in 1963.

== See also ==
- List of fossiliferous stratigraphic units in New Mexico
- Paleontology in New Mexico
