= Osha Canyon Formation =

Geologic formation in New Mexico, US

- Stratigraphic range: Bashkirian
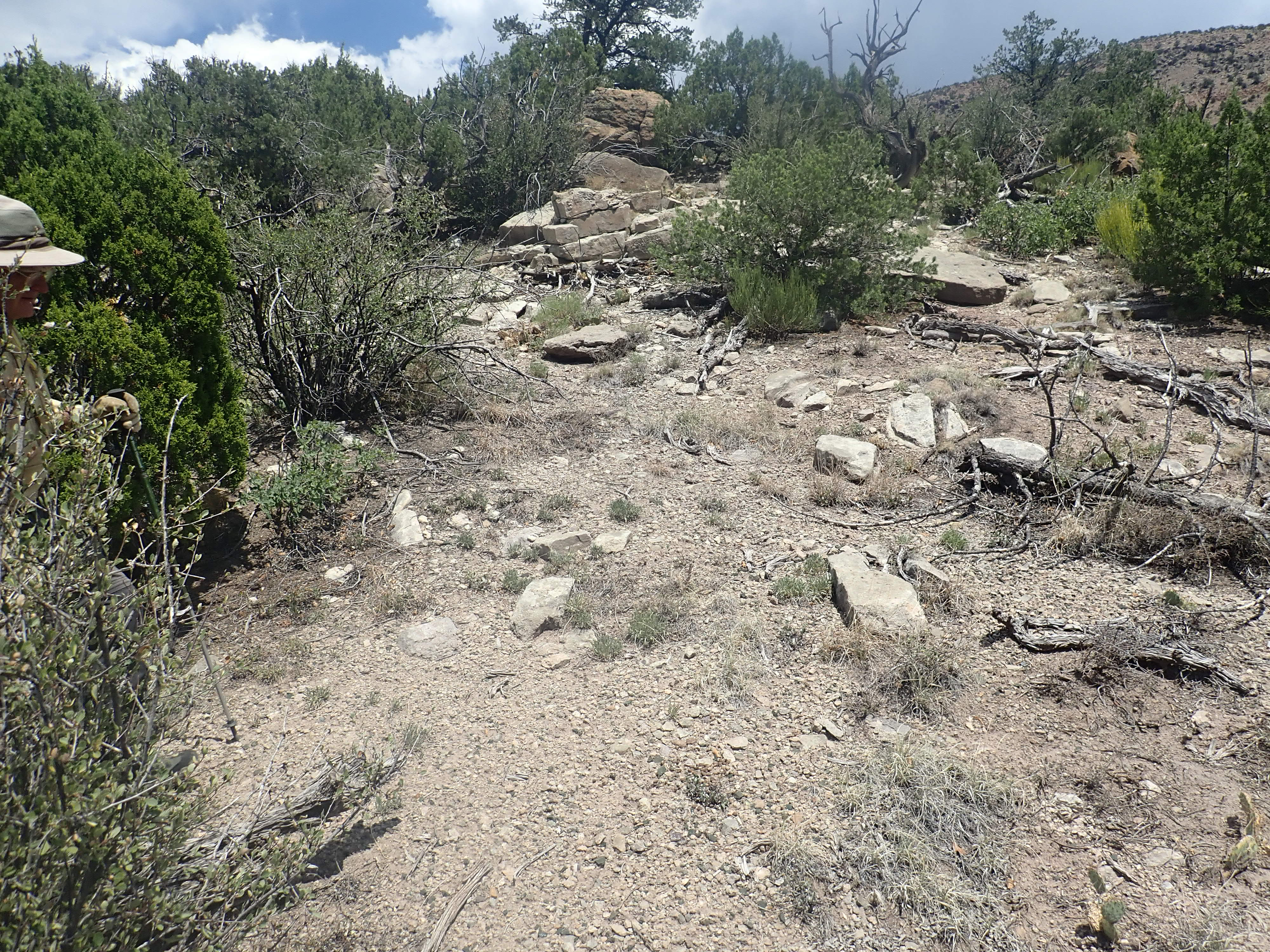
- Osha Canyon Formation near its type section at Guadalupe Box
- Type: Formation
- Underlies: Sandia Formation
- Overlies: Log Springs Formation
- Thickness: 90 ft (27 m) at type section

Lithology
- Primary: Shale
- Other: Limestone

Location
- Coordinates: 35.7331131°N 106.763088°W
- Region: Jemez Mountains
- Country: United States

Type section
- Named for: Osha Canyon 35.7030223°N 106.7687459°W
- Named by: H. DuChene
- Year defined: 1973
- Osha Canyon Formation (the United States) Osha Canyon Formation (New Mexico)

The Osha Canyon Formation is a geologic formation in the Nacimiento Mountains of New Mexico. It contains fossils characteristic of the Bashkirian stage of the Pennsylvanian period.

== Description ==
The base of the formation is fossiliferous marine limestone and shale while the upper section is mostly shale with limestone nodules. The topmost bed is calcareous sandstone. The total thickness is 90 feet (27 meters) at the type section. The formation is exposed only in a small area of the southern Nacimiento Mountains.

The formation is underlain by Precambrian basement rock or by Mississippian formations, such as the Log Springs Formation at the type location. It is overlain by the Sandia Formation, with a sharp erosional disconformity separating the uppermost calcareous marine sandstone bed of the Osha Canyon Formation from the basal crossbedded nonmarine sandstone bed of the Sandia Formation.

== Fossils ==
Fossils are characteristic of a marine shelf environment and include the brachiopod Schizophoria oklahomae and foraminifer Millerella characteristic of the Morrowan (lower Pennsylvanian.) The lower part of the formation contains several genera of solitary rugose corals, tabulate corals, and the bryozoans Fenestella, Septopora, Rhombopora and Tabulipora. Gastropods and bivalves are also present. No tabulate corals are found in the upper part of the formation, but here the diversity of chonetid brachiopods increases.

== History of investigation ==
Northrop and Wood recognized fossils of Schizophoria oklahomae, a lower Pennsylvanian brachiopod, at Guadelupe Box during their 1945 survey. Armstrong found additional examples of what he termed the Schizophoria oklahomae strata, and recognized that these were separated from the overlying middle Pennsylvania stata by an erosional surface, but did not assign a formal unit name to the beds. The formation was formally named by H. DuChene in 1973 for exposures near the Gilman Tunnels in the Jemez Mountains of New Mexico.

== See also ==
- List of fossiliferous stratigraphic units in New Mexico
- Paleontology in New Mexico
