= Alamitos Formation =

Geologic formation of New Mexico

- Stratigraphic range: Moscovian–Asselian
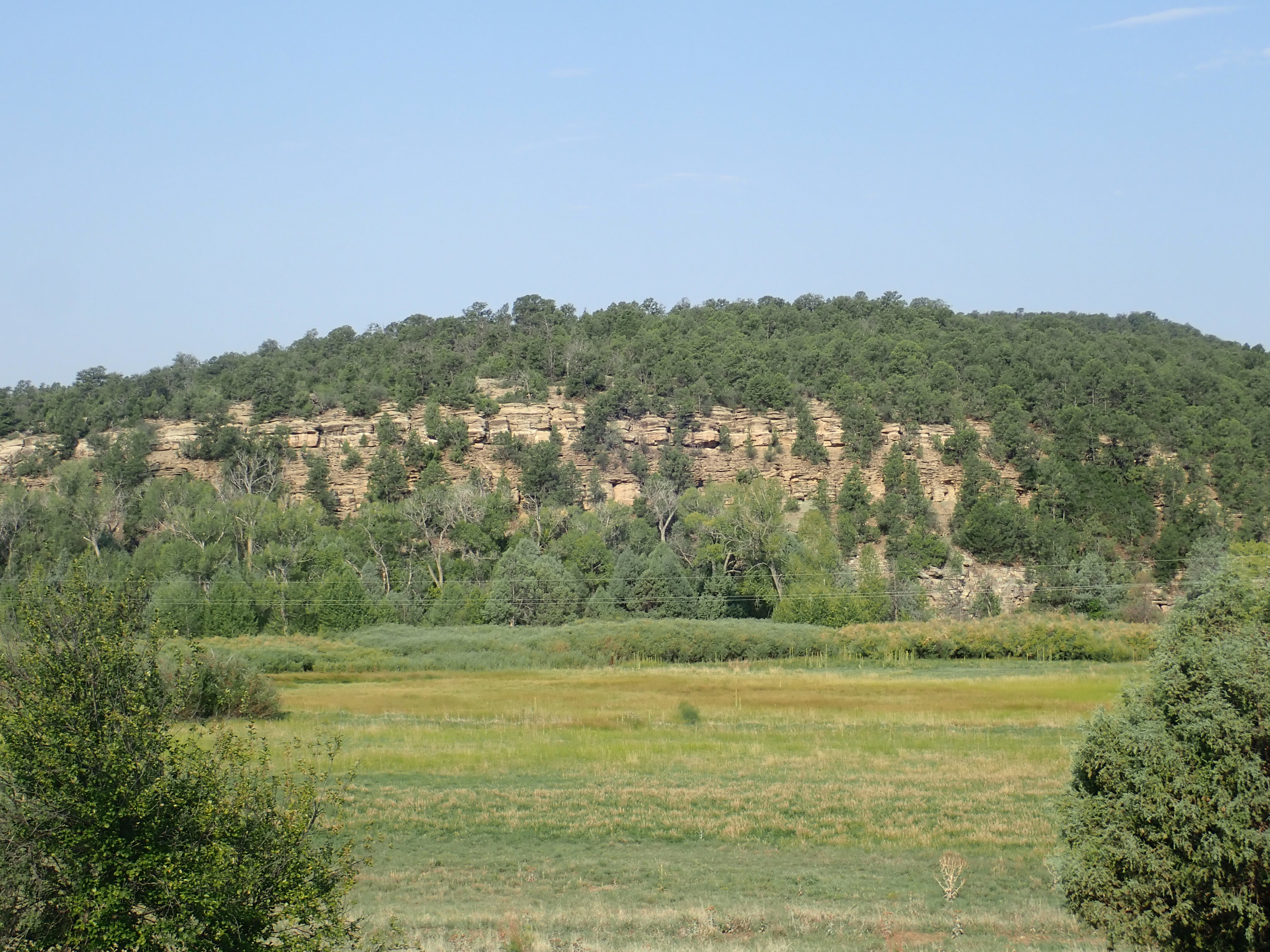
- Alamitos Formation at one of its reference sections
- Type: Formation
- Underlies: Sangre de Cristo Formation
- Overlies: La Pasada Formation, Porvenir Formation, Flechado Formation
- Thickness: 645–1,828 ft (197–557 m)

Lithology
- Primary: Sandstone
- Other: Limestone, shale

Location
- Coordinates: 35.619°N 105.690°W
- Region: New Mexico
- Country: United States

Type section
- Named for: Alamitos Canyon
- Named by: P.K. Sutherland
- Year defined: 1963
- Alamitos Formation (the United States) Alamitos Formation (New Mexico)

The Alamitos Formation is a geologic formation exposed in the southern Sangre de Cristo Mountains of New Mexico. It preserves fossils dating back to the late Pennsylvanian to early Permian periods.

== Description ==
The formation consists mostly of sandstone and conglomerate (50%) with lesser amounts of limestone (21%) and shale and siltstone (29%). The limestone tends to be more abundant in the upper third of the formation, though the formation shows considerable lateral variation.

The formation is underlain by the La Pasada Formation in the southwestern Sangre de Cristo Mountains with the contact placed at an abrupt transition from limestone to arkosic sandstone and conglomerate. In the southern Sangre de Cristo Mountains, the underlying formation is the Porvenir Formation, while to the north the underlying formation is the Flechado Formation. The Alamitos Formation is overlain by the Sangre de Cristo Formation with the contact placed at the uppermost well-developed limestone bed.

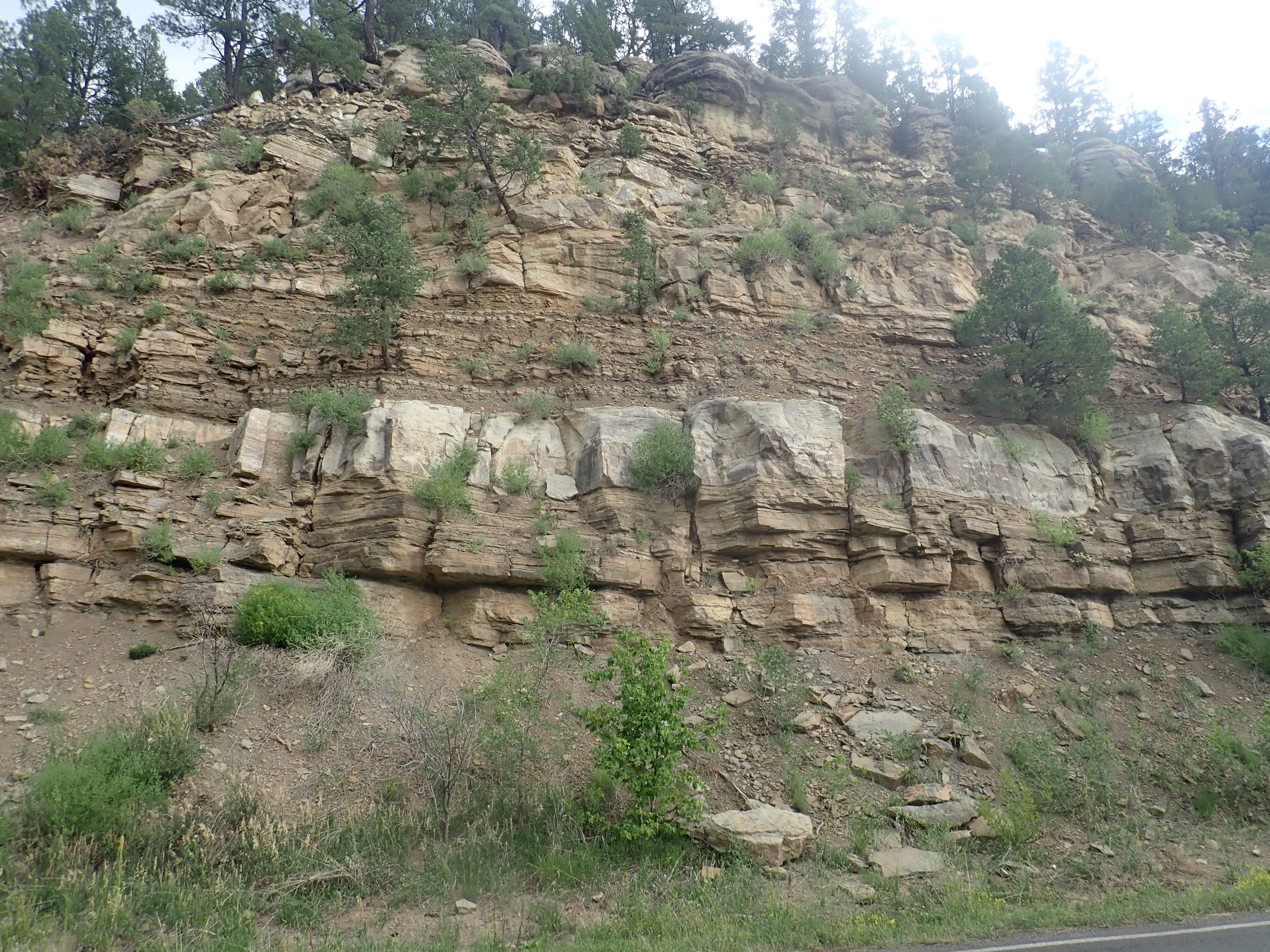
Alamitos Formation exposed in a road cut north of Pecos

== Fossils ==
The formation contains fossils ranging in age from middle Desmoinesian (Moscovian) to early Wolfcampian (Asselian). These include the fusulinids Beedeina, Triticites, and Schwagerina. The formation also contains abraded fragments of crinoids and bryozoans.

== History of investigation ==
The formation was first named by P.K. Sutherland in 1963, who considered it correlative with the upper part of the Madera Formation. However, in 2004, Kues and Giles recommended restricting the Madera Group to shelf and marginal basin beds of Desmoinean (upper Moscovian) to early Virgilian age, which excluded the Alamitos Formation. Lucas et al. also exclude the Alamitos Formation from the Madera Group.

== See also ==
- List of fossiliferous stratigraphic units in New Mexico
- Paleontology in New Mexico
