= Sais Quartzite =

Geologic formation in New Mexico, US

Formation
- Stratigraphic range: Statherian
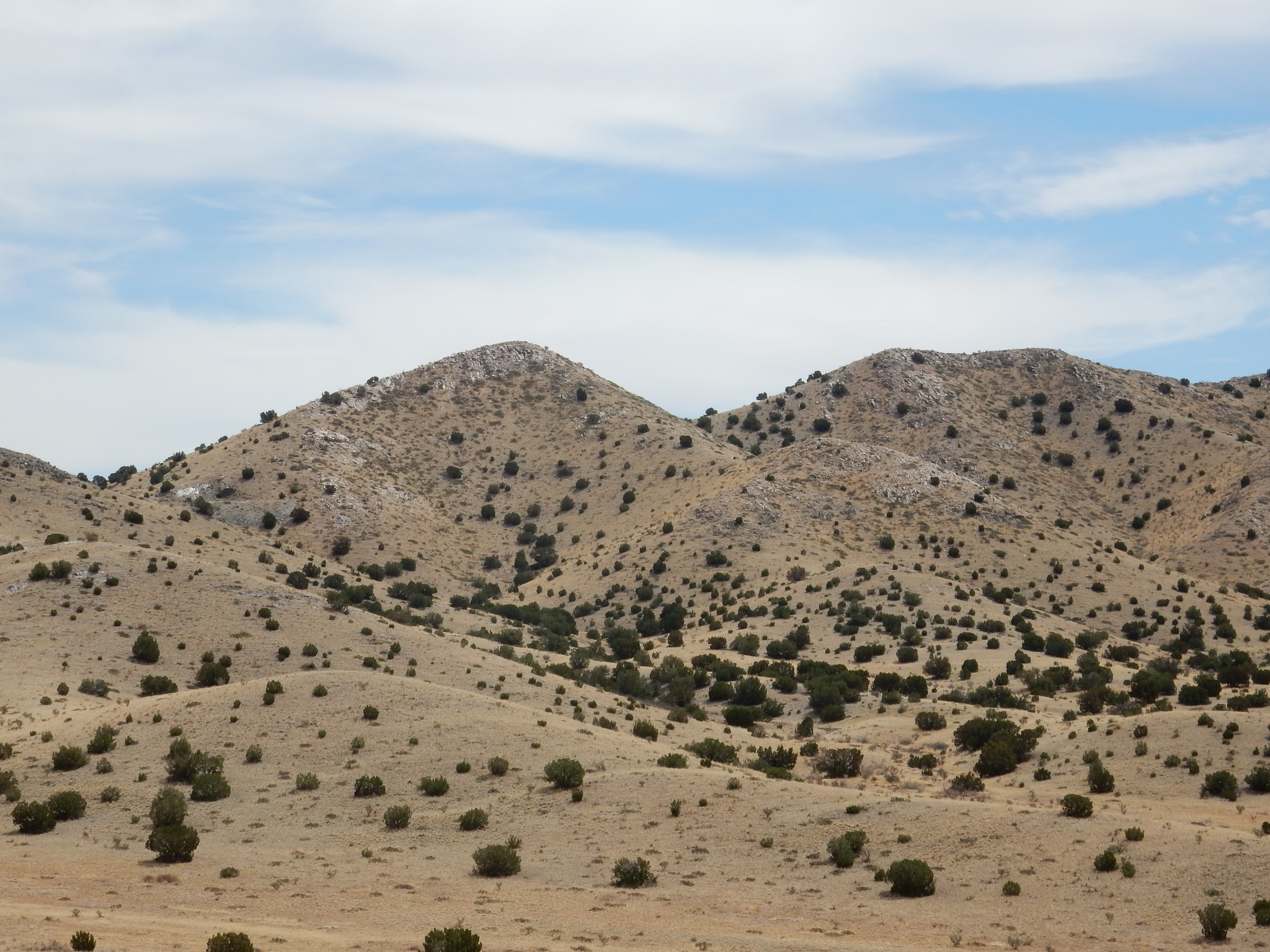
- Sais Quartzite at its type location near Abo Pass, New Mexico, US
- Type: Formation
- Unit of: Manzano Group
- Underlies: Blue Springs Formation
- Overlies: Estadio Schist
- Thickness: 600 feet (180 m)

Lithology
- Primary: Quartzite

Location
- Coordinates: 34.412°N 106.516°W
- Region: New Mexico
- Country: United States

Type section
- Named for: Sais railroad station
- Named by: J.T. Stark and E.C. Dapples
- Year defined: 1946
- Sais Quartzite (the United States) Sais Quartzite (New Mexico)

The Sais Quartzite is a geologic formation exposed in the Los Pinos Mountains of central New Mexico.

== Description ==
The formation consists of up to 600 feet (180 m) of massive gray quartzite beds, 3 to 5 feet (0.91 to 1.52 m) thick, interbedded with thinner sericite-bearing quartzite beds. A few beds are greenish to white. The individual grain size in the beds is generally less than 1mm. The formation is underlain by the Estadio Schist and unconformably overlain by the Blue Springs Formation.

Detrital zircon geochronology a minimum age of 1670 million years (Ma), corresponding to the Statherian period of the Paleoproterozoic.

== History of investigation ==
The formation was originally described as the Sais quartzite by J.T. Stark and E.C. Dapples in 1946 and named for the Sais station of the Santa Fe Railroad near Abo Pass. The formation was first assigned to the Manzano Group in 2006.

== See also ==
- List of fossiliferous stratigraphic units in New Mexico
- Paleontology in New Mexico
