= Arroyo Penasco Group =

Geologic formation in northern New Mexico, United States

- Stratigraphic range: Visean
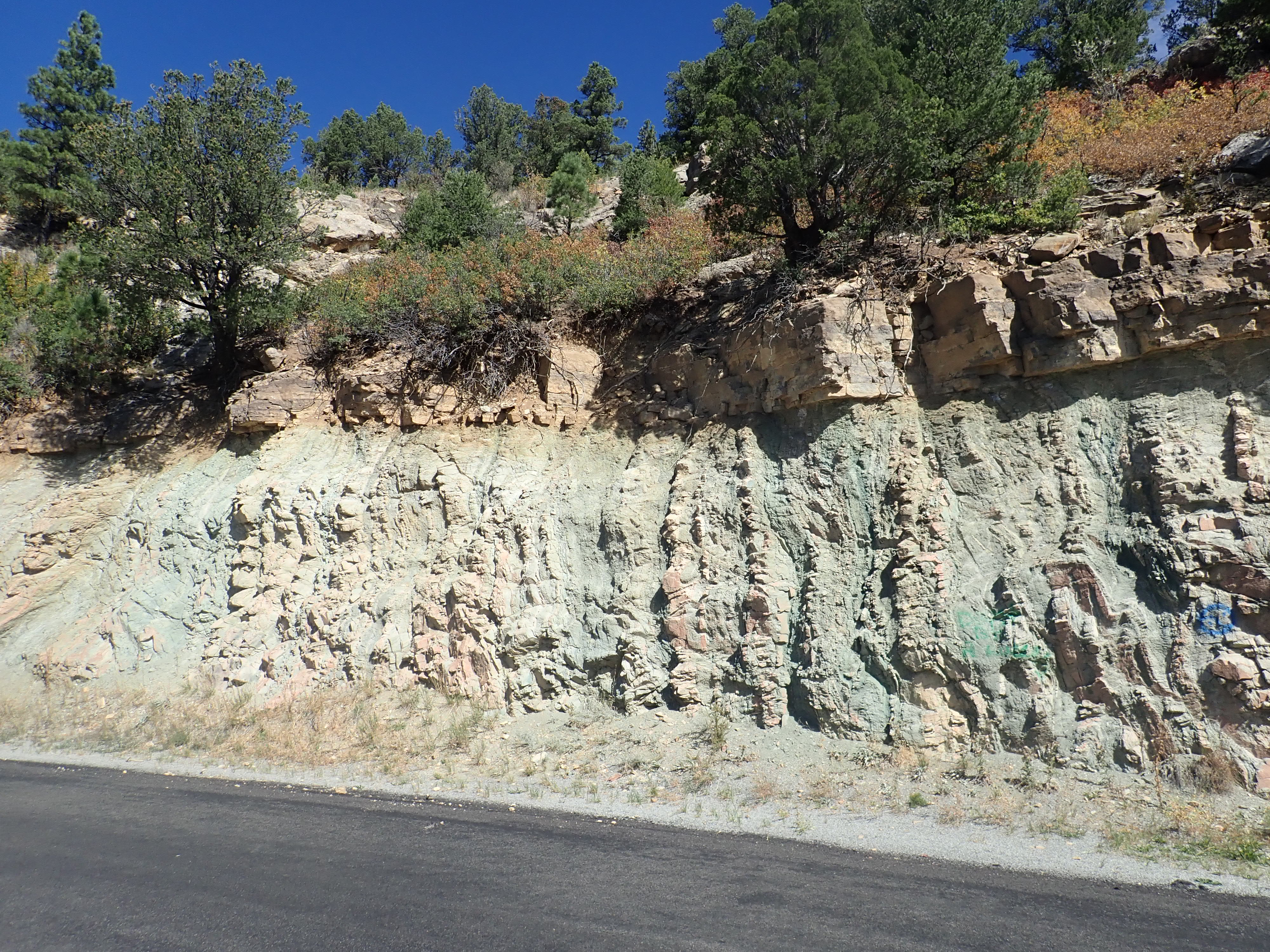
- Arroyo Penasco Group resting on Precambrian rock
- Type: Group
- Sub-units: Espiritu Santo Formation, Tererro Formation
- Underlies: Log Springs Formation
- Overlies: Precambrian basement
- Thickness: 95 m at type section

Lithology
- Primary: Limestone
- Other: Sandstone

Location
- Coordinates: 35.6406°N 106.8529°W
- Region: New Mexico
- Country: United States

Type section
- Named for: Arroyo Penasco (35.5591955°N 106.8647114°W)
- Named by: A.K. Armstrong (1955)
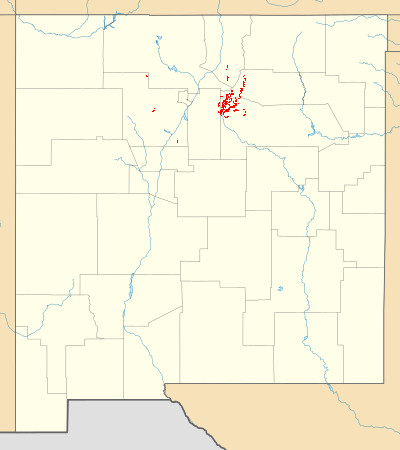
- Arroyo Penasco Group (New Mexico) Arroyo Penasco outcrop map

The Arroyo Penasco Group is a group of geological formations exposed in the Nacimiento, Jemez, Sandia, and Sangre de Cristo Mountains of northern New Mexico. It preserves fossils characteristic of the late Mississippian.

== Description ==
The Arroyo Penasco Group consists of marine sedimentary formations, primarily massive limestone but with some sandstone. It is divided into the lower Espiritu Santo Formation and the upper Tererro Formation.

The lowermost part of the Espiritu Santo Formation is designated the Del Padre Member and is a transgressive siltstone, sandstone, and shale unit, which interfingers with the carbonate rocks of the upper Espiritu Santo Formation, recording the advance of the sea into the area. A similar sequence is seen in the Tererro Formation, whose base is a collapse breccia.

The group rests everywhere on Precambrian basement that shows remarkably little relief, suggesting that the group was deposited on a peneplain. Its outcrops are spotty and its upper contact shows indications of well-developed karst topography, often filled in by the iron-rich sediments of the Log Springs Formation, indicating that it was heavily eroded before deposition of the Sandia Formation.

The Espiritu Santo Formation has undergone dolomitization, dedolomitization, and calcitization of gypsum and the Macho Member (the lowest part of the Tererro Formation) has experienced dissolution and brecciation. Together with the presence of paleosilcretes in the Manuelitas Member, the middle part of the Tererro Formation, this suggests a history of at least four episodes of sea level fluctuation during the Mississippian in northern New Mexico. Diagenetic fabrics can be traced across the region, demonstrating that the group was deposited across an extensive surface of low relief.

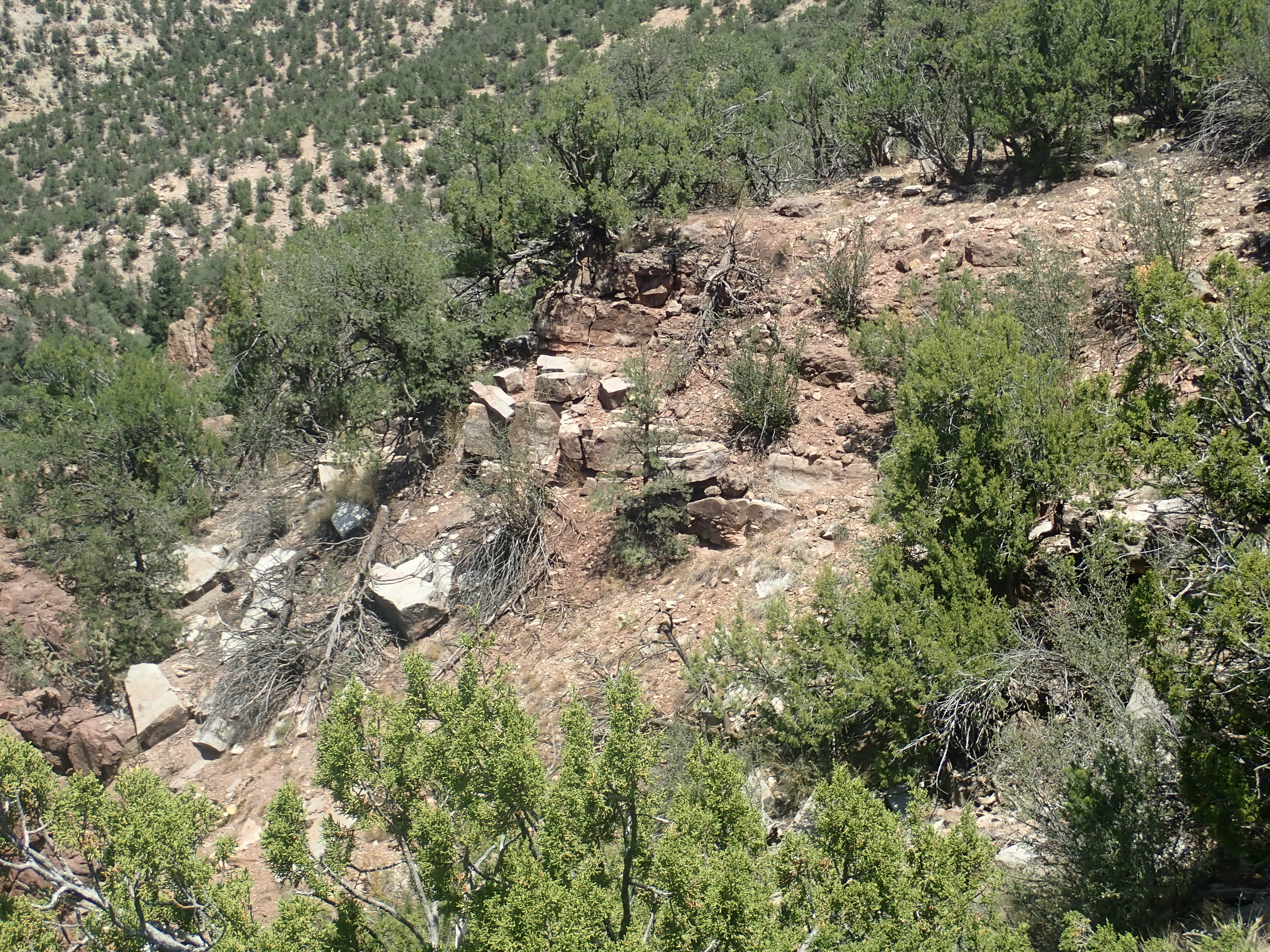
Massive limestone beds of the Arroyo Penasco Group on the rim of Guadelupe Box

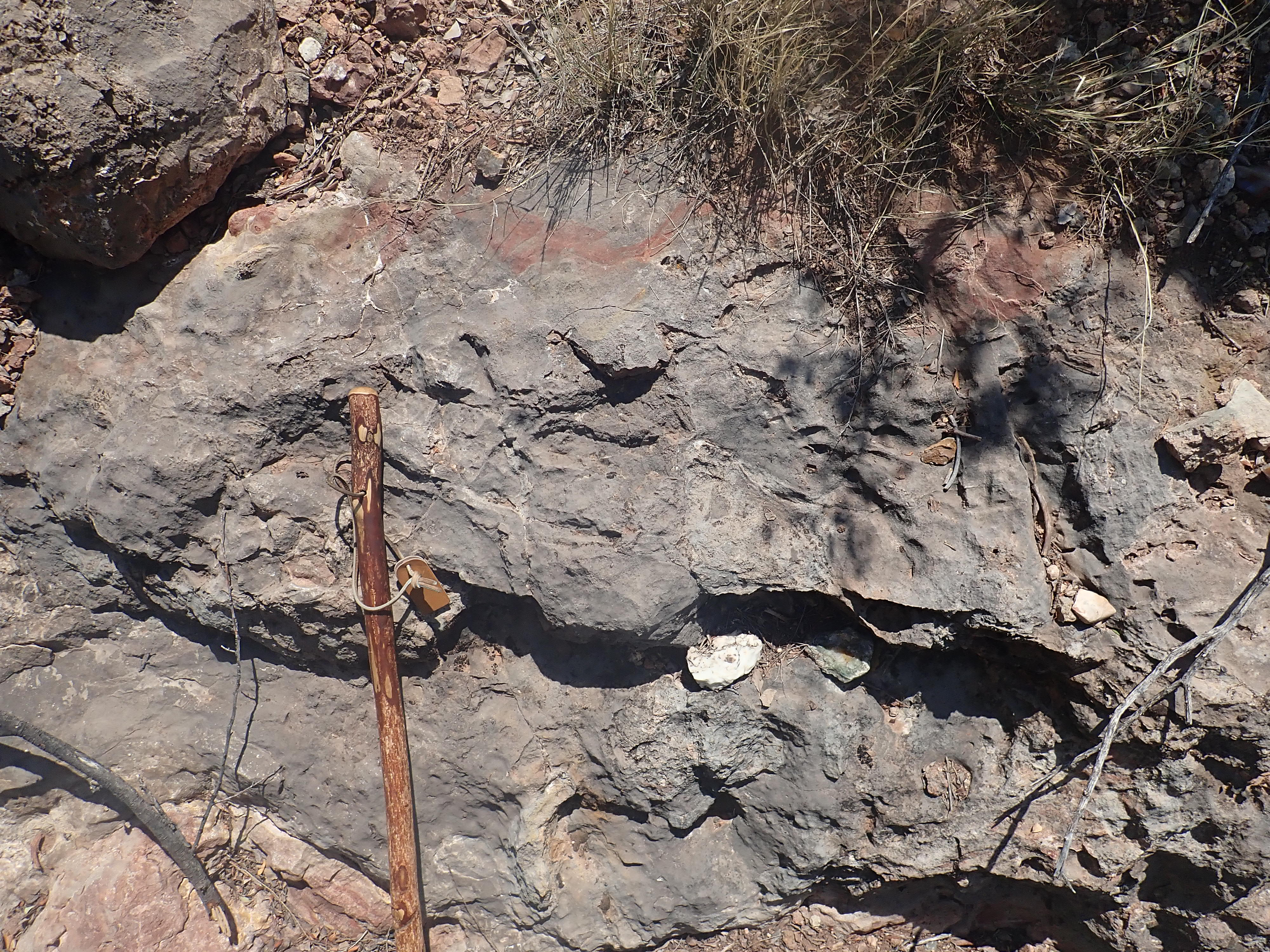
Closer view of massive limestone of the Arroyo Penasco Group at Guadelupe Box

== Fossils ==
The fossil assemblage suggests an age of Osagean to Meramecian.

Brachiopoda
Genus	Species	Location	Stratigraphic position	Material	Notes	Images
Eumetria	verneuiliana Hall	Penasco Canyon				
Eumetria	vera Hall	Penasco Canyon; San Pedro Mountains				
Linoproductus	ovatus Hall	Penasco Canyon				
Composita	aff. lewisensis Weller	Penasco Canyon				
Spirifer		Penasco Canyon; San Pedro Mountains; Tecolote Creek				

Mollusca
Genus	Species	Location	Stratigraphic position	Material	Notes	Images
Staparollus		Penasco Canyon				
Leptodesma		Penasco Canyon				

Bryozoa
Genus	Species	Location	Stratigraphic position	Material	Notes	Images
Fenestella		Penasco Canyon				
Archimedes		Penasco Canyon				

Foraminifera
Genus	Species	Location	Stratigraphic position	Material	Notes	Images
Endothyra		Penasco Canyon; San Pedro Mountains; Lujan Canyon, Rincon Range; Gallinas Canyon; Tecolote Creek; El Macho, Pecos River Canyon				
Plectogyra		Penasco Canyon; San Pedro Mountains; Lujan Canyon, Rincon Range; Gallinas Canyon; Tecolote Creek; El Macho, Pecos River Canyon				

Cnidaria
Genus	Species	Location	Stratigraphic position	Material	Notes	Images
Triplophyllites		Lujan Canyon, Rincon Range				
Conularia		Lujan Canyon, Rincon Range; Tecolote Creek				

== History of investigation ==
The massive limestone beds of the Arroyo Penasco Group were originally included as the base of the Pennsylvanian Sandia Formation. The discovery of Endothyra and Plectogyra in 1951 showed that the beds were actually Mississippian in age, and they were split off as the Arroyo Penasco Formation. The Arroyo Penasco was later found to correlate to the Espiritu Santo Formation and Tererro Formation in the Sangre de Cristo Mountains, and it was promoted to group rank.

== See also ==
- List of fossiliferous stratigraphic units in New Mexico
- Paleontology in New Mexico
