= Abajo Formation =

Geologic formation in New Mexico, US

- Stratigraphic range: Statherian
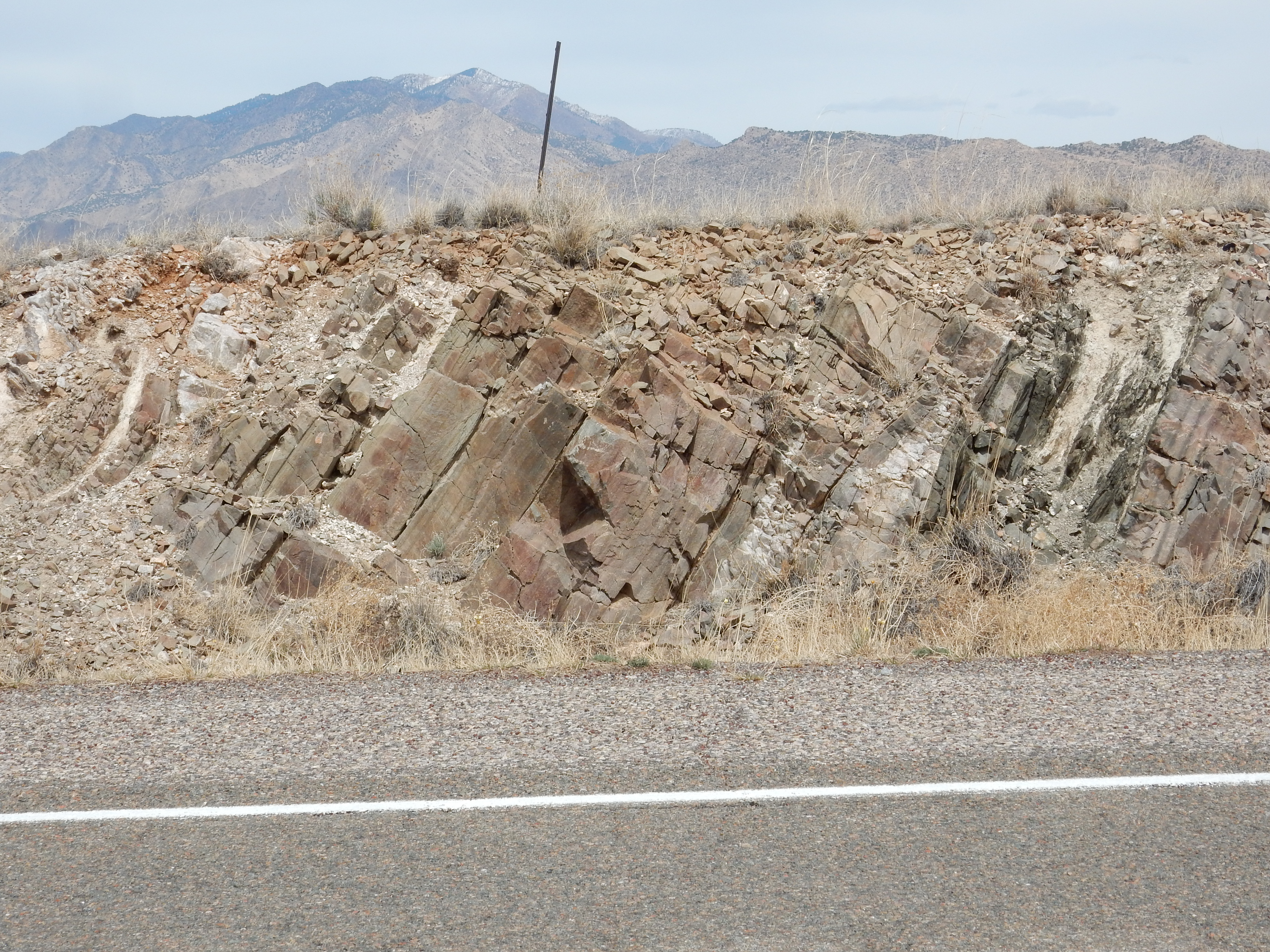
- Abajo Formation in a road cut west of Abo Pass, New Mexico, US
- Type: Formation
- Unit of: Manzano Group
- Underlies: White Ridge Quartzite
- Overlies: Sevilleta Metarhyolite
- Thickness: 4,500 ft (1,400 m)

Lithology
- Primary: Schist
- Other: Lithic arenite

Location
- Coordinates: 34.575°N 106.492°W
- Region: Los Pinos Mountains, New Mexico
- Country: United States

Type section
- Named by: S.H. Baer
- Year defined: 2004
- Abajo Formation (the United States) Abajo Formation (New Mexico)

The Abajo Formation is a geologic formation in the Los Pinos Mountains of central New Mexico. It was deposited about 1660 million years (Ma) ago, corresponding to the Statherian period.

== History of investigation ==
The unit was first defined by S.H. Baer in 2004. and assigned to the Manzano Group by Amy Luther in 2006.

== Geology ==
The formation is divided into two members. The Abajo Lithic Arenite consists of various metasedimentary rocks interbedded with amphibolites interpreted as metamorphosed gabbroic dikes. The Abajo Schist consists of metasedimentary schist interbedded with metamorphosed basaltic dikes and flows. The formation is interpreted as sediments deposed during a period of volcanic activity.

Detrital zircon grains in the formation are almost identical in age and isotope composition to the underlying Sevilleta metarhyolite, suggesting that the sediments of the quartzite were weathered almost exclusively from local sources. The minimum zircon age is about 1660 Ma, and radiometric dating of underlying and overlying formations place the age of the formation at about this time.
