= Log Springs Formation =

Geologic formation in New Mexico, United States

- Stratigraphic range: Namurian
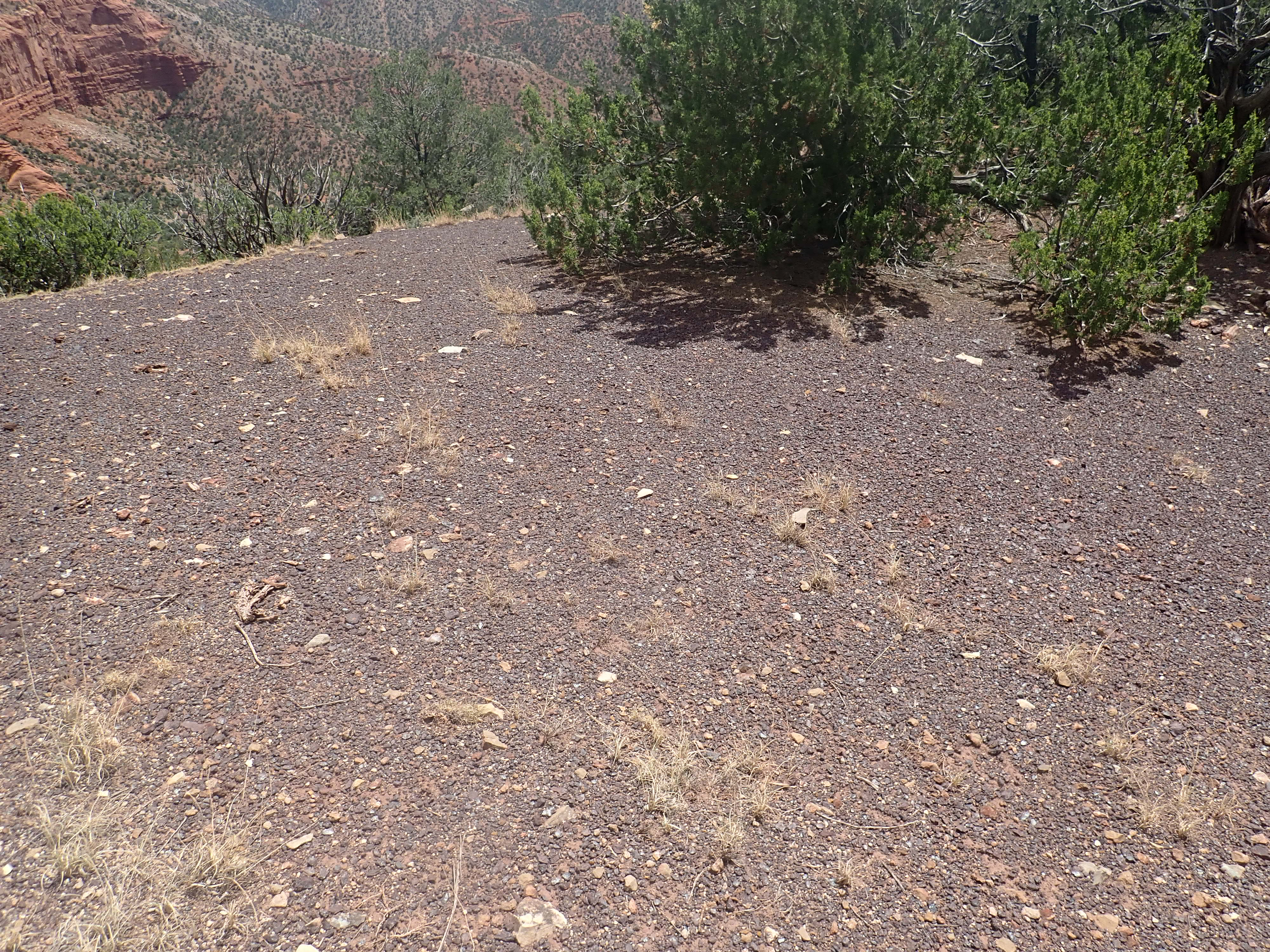
- Log Springs Formation at Guadelupe Box
- Type: Formation
- Underlies: Osha Canyon Formation
- Overlies: Arroyo Penasco Group
- Thickness: 25 m (82 ft)

Lithology
- Primary: Ferruginous shale
- Other: Sandstone

Location
- Region: New Mexico
- Country: United States

Type section
- Named for: Log Springs (35.6469884°N 106.858237°W)
- Named by: A.K. Armstrong
- Year defined: 1955
- Log Springs Formation (the United States) Log Springs Formation (New Mexico)

The Log Springs Formation is a geologic formation in the Jemez, Nacimiento, and Sandia Mountains of New Mexico. Its age is poorly constrained but is thought to be Namurian (late Mississippian to early Pennsylvanian).

== Description ==
The Log Springs Formation is a sequence of continental red beds interpreted as reworked terra rossa soils and sediments from nearby highlands filling karst topography in the underlying Arroyo Penasco Group. Its outcrops are spotty everywhere but near the type section in the southern Jemez Mountains, where it is 25 meters (82 feet) thick, and it does not crop out in the Sangre de Cristo Mountains.

The lowermost 3 meters of the formation are hematitic shales with numerous 1 to 5 mm oolites or pisolites. The upper part of the formation is an upward coarsening sequence of crossbedded argillaceous reddish sandstones. These include abundant clasts of Precambrian gneiss, greenstone, and quartz.

Though lacking in fossils, the formation is estimated as being Namurian (late Mississippian to early Pennsylvanian) in age based on fossils in underlying and overlying beds. Its clastic beds record the beginnings of tectonic uplift associated with the Ancestral Rocky Mountains. It probably correlates with the Molas Formation of the Animas Valley.

== History of investigation ==
Beds at this stratigraphic position were originally included in the Sandia Formation. However, when Augustus Armstrong determined that the beds were separated from the underlying Mississippian beds by an unconformity and were overlain by beds older than the bulk of the Sandia Formation, he recommended separating them into the Log Springs Formation.
