= Sandia Formation =

Geologic formation in New Mexico, United States

- Stratigraphic range: Bashkirian–Moscovian
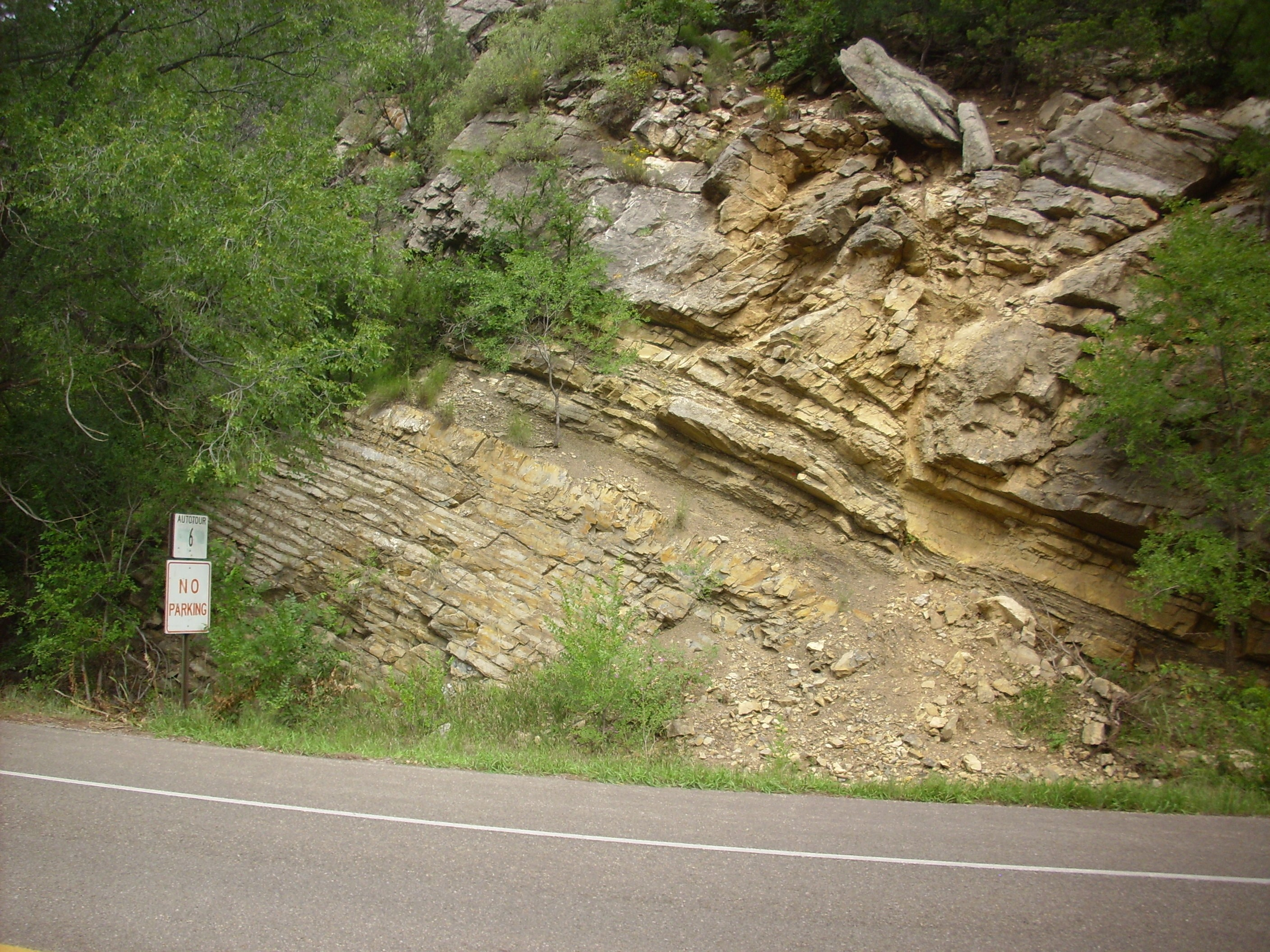
- Sandia Formation in the Sandia Mountains
- Type: Formation
- Underlies: Madera Group
- Overlies: Osha Canyon Formation
- Thickness: 1,530 m (5,020 ft)

Lithology
- Primary: Shale
- Other: Sandstone

Location
- Coordinates: 35°58′35″N 105°17′00″W
- Region: New Mexico
- Country: United States

Type section
- Named for: Sandia Mountains
- Named by: C.L. Herrick
- Year defined: 1900
- Sandia Formation (the United States) Sandia Formation (New Mexico)

The Sandia Formation is a geologic formation in New Mexico, United States. Its fossil assemblage is characteristic of the early Pennsylvanian.

== Description ==
The Sandia Formation is mostly shale with some sandstone and conglomerate but only minor limestone beds, with the coarser sediments towards its base. Variations in thickness indicate deposition on an eroded Precambrian surface. The formation reaches its maximum thickness of 1,530 meters (5,020 feet) in the northern Sangre de Cristo Mountains, where its great inhomogeneity both laterally and vertically indicates a complex marine and nonmarine depositional environment. It is found in the Sandia, Jemez, Sangre de Cristo, and Manzano Mountains as well as the Las Vegas Basin.

The formation rests on Precambrian basement rock in the Sandia Mountains, but is underlain by Osha Canyon Formation in the southern Jemez Mountains or by formations of the Arroyo Penasco Group in the Sangre de Cristo Mountains and elsewhere. It transitions to the Madera Group in most locations, with the base of the Madera Group typically placed at the first massive limestone bed above the shales and sandstones of the Sandia Formation.

The Sandia Formation likely correlates with the Pinkerton Trail Formation of the Colorado Plateau.

== Fossil content ==
Fossils found in the formation range from Morrowan brachiopods at its base to Atokan fusulinids at its top, making it a lower to middle Pennsylvanian formation. The uppermost beds contain abundant fossils of the fusulinid Fusulinella famula. However, the Morrowan section is missing in the Manzanos. The exposures at Priest Canyon in the southern Manzanos include Syringopora and the demosponge Chaetetes. The formation is bioturbated, with trace fossils of Zoophycos, in the southern Nacimiento Mountains.

== History of investigation ==
The formation was first named by C.L. Herrick in 1900 for exposures in the Sandia Mountains of New Mexico. Herrick included the entire sequence of clastic beds resting on the Great Unconformity. Gordon identified the clastic beds between the Kelly Limestone and Madera Limestone in the Magdalena Mountains as Sandia Formation.

In 1946, Wood and Northrop divided the Sandia Formation as then defined into a Lower Limestone Member and an Upper Clastic Member in the Nacimiento Mountains. Armstrong discovered in 1951 that the Lower Limestone Member included Mississippian beds, which he broke out into the Arroyo Penasco Formation, separated by a clastic sequence (the Log Springs Formation) from early Pennsylvanian beds. Armstrong also noted that the zone immediately above the Log Springs Formation was characterized by fossils of the early Pennsylvanian brachiopod Schizophoria oklahomae and was separated from younger beds by an erosional discontinuity. These were broken out into the Osha Canyon Formation by H. DuChene in 1973

== See also ==
- List of fossiliferous stratigraphic units in New Mexico
- Paleontology in New Mexico
