= Sevilleta Metarhyolite =

Geologic formation in New Mexico, US

- Stratigraphic range: Statherian
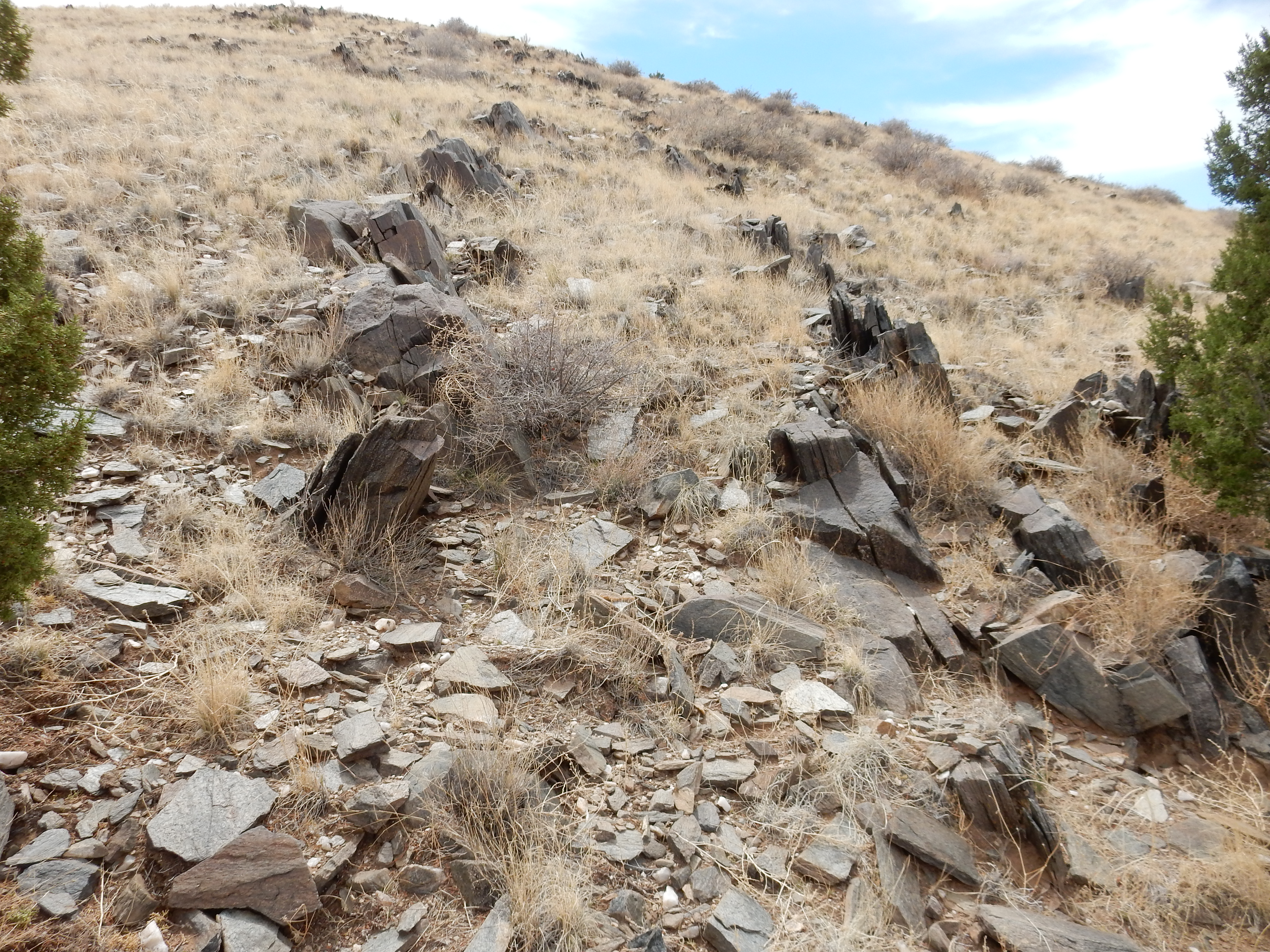
- Sevilleta Metarhyolite west of Abo Pass, New Mexico, US
- Type: Formation
- Unit of: Manzano Group
- Underlies: Abajo Formation
- Overlies: Bootleg Canyon Sequence
- Thickness: 4,500 ft (1,400 m)

Lithology
- Primary: Rhyolite
- Other: Schist, amphibolite

Location
- Coordinates: 34.408°N 106.525°W
- Region: Los Pinos Mountains, New Mexico
- Country: United States

Type section
- Named for: Sevilleta land grant, Socorro County, New Mexico
- Named by: Stark and Dapples
- Year defined: 1946
- Sevilleta Metarhyolite (the United States) Sevilleta Metarhyolite (New Mexico)

The Sevilleta Metarhyolite (or Sevilleta Formation) is a geologic formation in central New Mexico. It has a radiometric age of 1665 ± 16 Ma, corresponding to the Statherian period.

== History of investigation ==
The unit was first defined by Stark and Dapples in 1959, during their mapping of the Los Pinos Mountains, as the Sevilleta rhyolite. Condie and Budding called the unit the Sevilleta Formation in their 1979 work. Bauer and Pollock called the unit the Sevilleta metarhyolite in their compilation of radiometric ages in 1993.

== Geology ==
The unit is a thick sequence of interbedded metarhyolites, pelitic schists, and amphibolites. The metarhyolite making up the bulk of the unit is a tan to dark red, glassy, fine-grained metarhyolite with abundant potassium feldspar phenocrysts. The modal composition is 25% quartz, 30% plagioclase, 40% potassium feldspar, 1% muscovite, 1% biotite, 1% epidote, 1% oxides, and 1% accessory minerals. Accessory minerals include actinolite, chlorite, carbonate minerals, and zircon. Radiometric ages range from 1658 Ma to 1670 Ma with a consensus age of 1662±1 Ma.

The formation is included in the Manzano Group. It overlies the Bootleg Canyon Sequence and is in turn overlain by the Abajo Formation.

Similar beds are found in the Hells Canyon area of the northern Manzanita Mountains (34.892°N 106.403°W) and the Monte Largo Hills (35.183°N 106.278°W). However, the Hells Canyon outcrops may be older than the main exposures of the unit.

The unit is interpreted as a product of caldera eruptions associated with the Mazatzal orogeny.
