= Manzano Mountains =

Mountain range in the central part of New Mexico, United States

Coordinates: 34.79°N 106.40°W

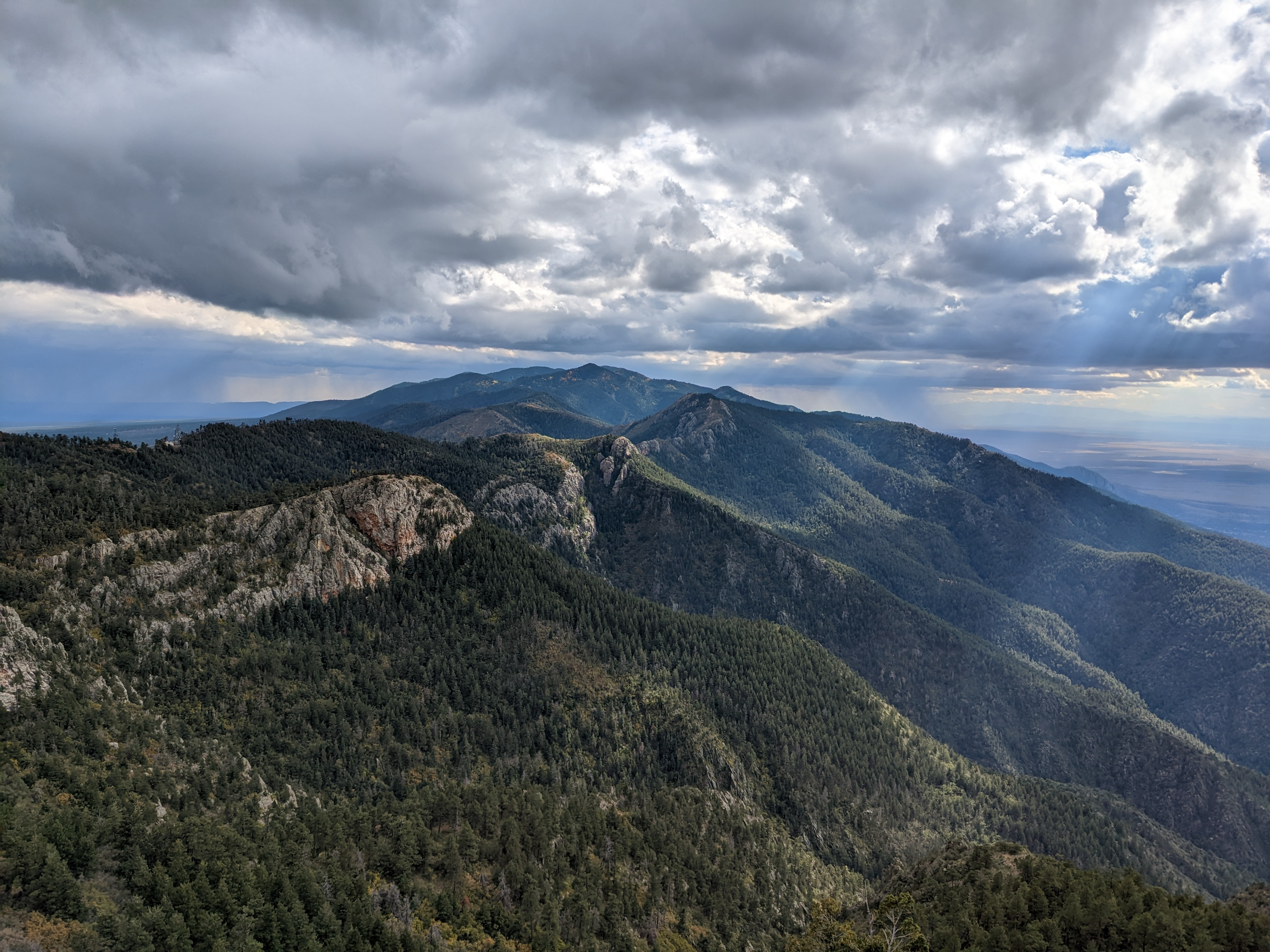
Looking South, from near Capilla Peak, along the Manzano Mountains

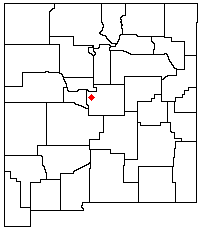
Location of the Manzano Mountains within New Mexico

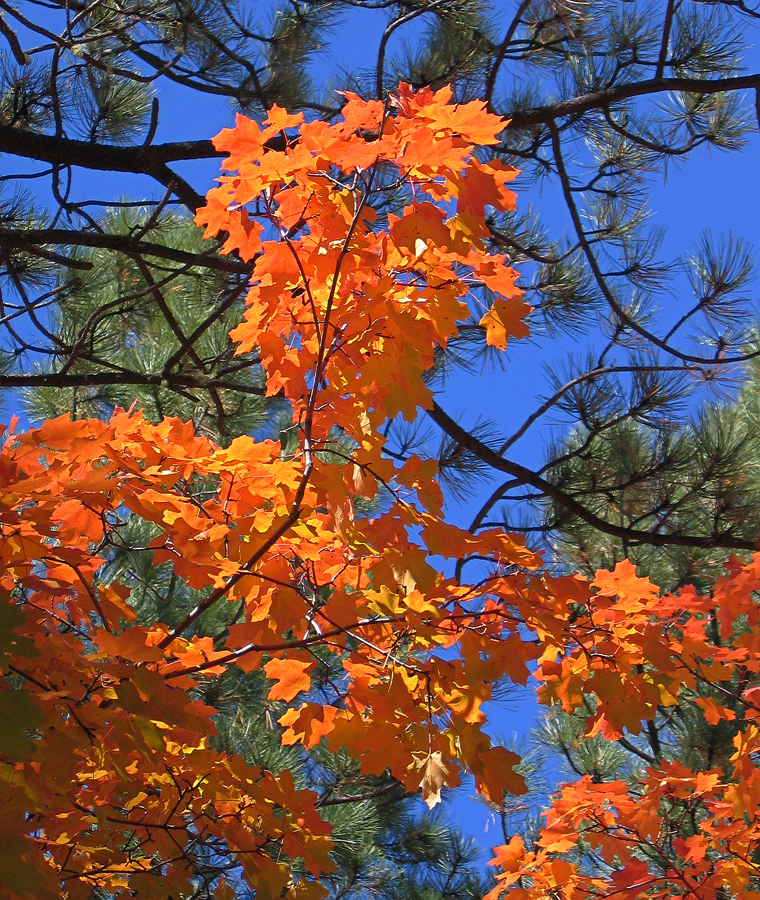
Fall maple, Fourth of July Canyon

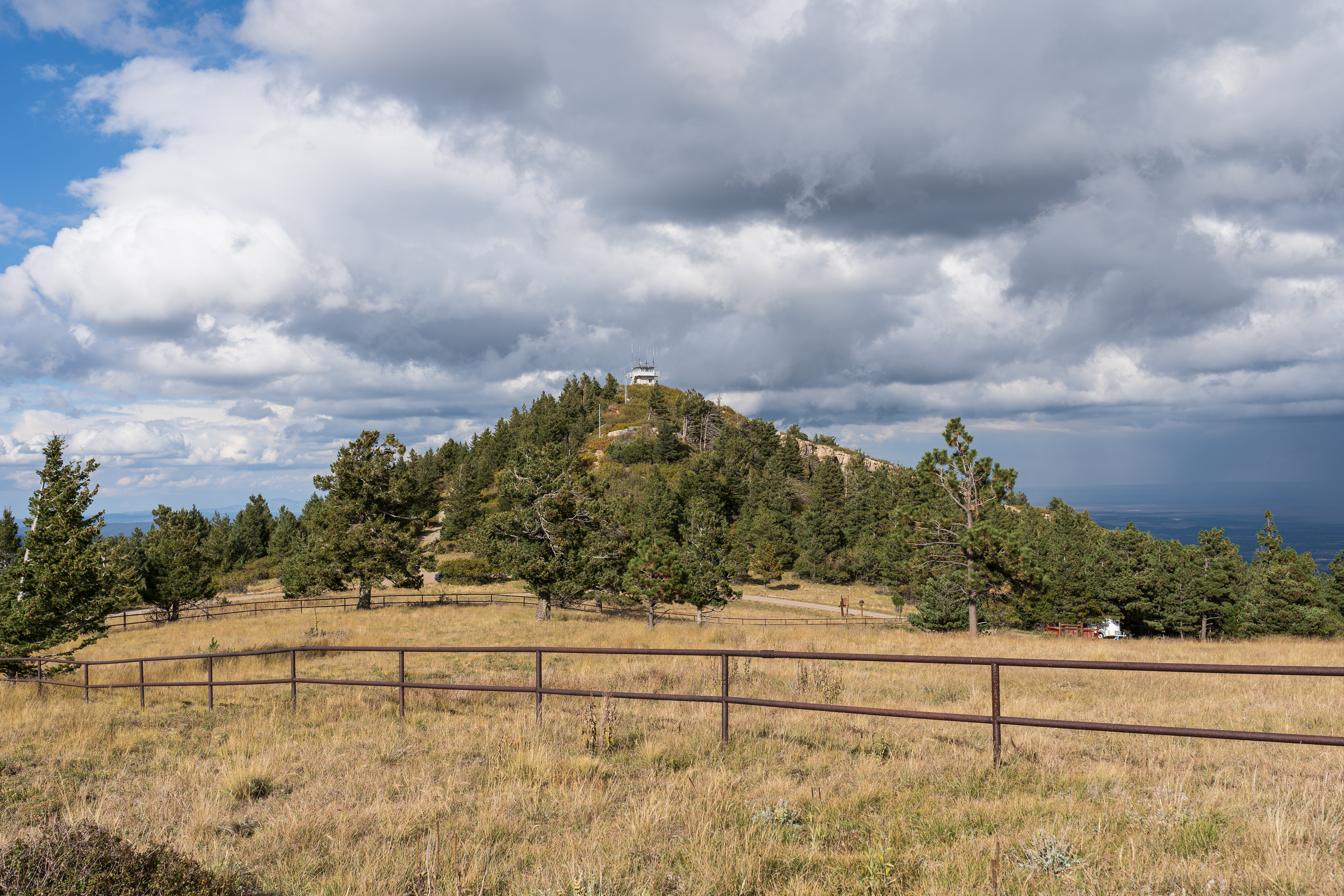
Capilla Peak Lookout at an elevation of 9,368 ft

The Manzano Mountains are a small mountain range in the central part of the U.S. state of New Mexico. They are oriented north–south and are 30 miles long. The center of the range lies due east of the town of Belen. The name "Manzano" is Spanish for "apple tree"; the mountains were named for apple orchards planted at the nearby town of Manzano.

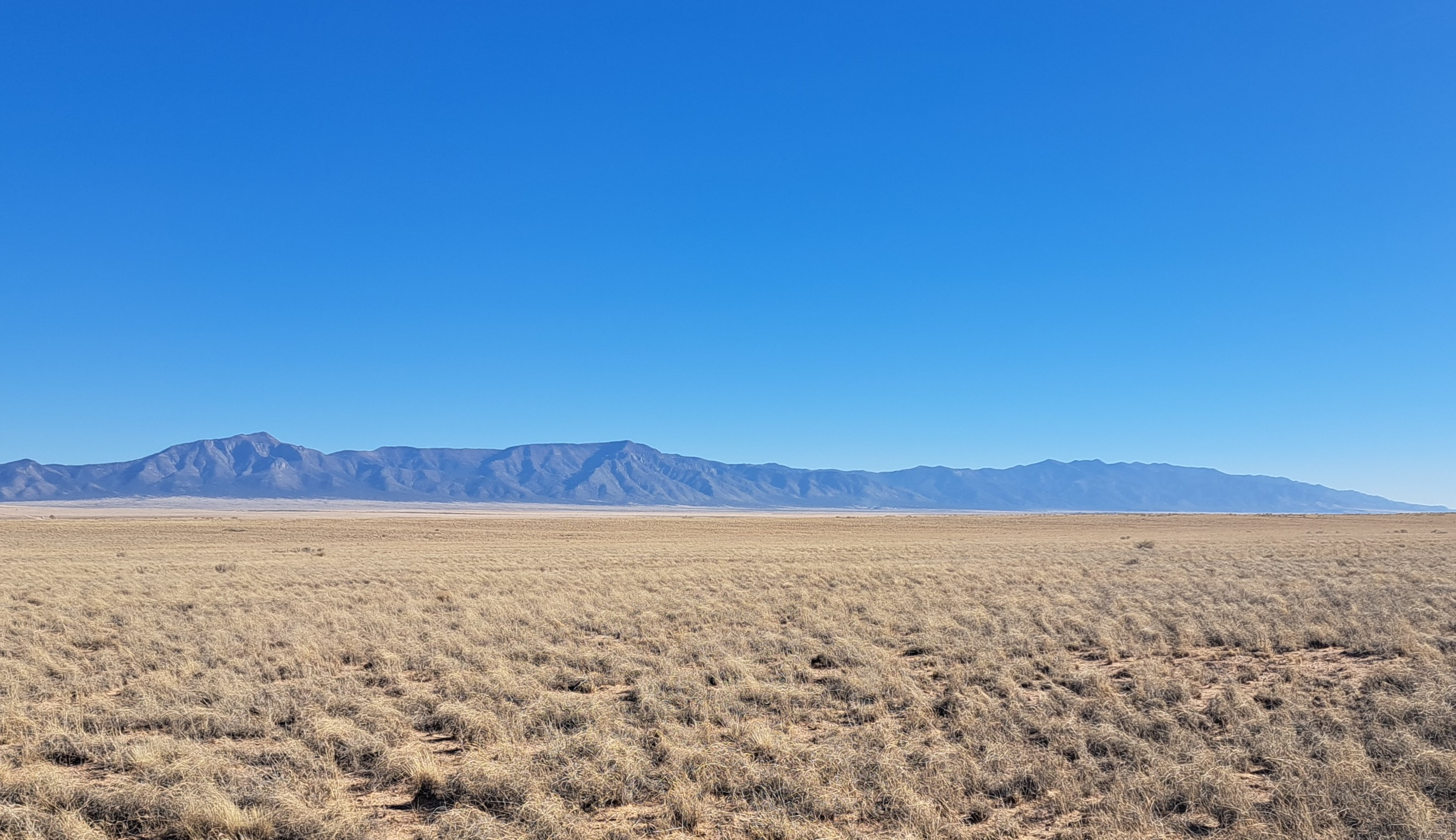
The Manzanos viewed from Mesa del Sol near Albuquerque, New Mexico

The high point of the Manzano Mountains is Manzano Peak (10,098 ft; 3,078 m), at the southern end of the range. Other notable peaks include flat-topped Bosque Peak (9,610 ft; 2,930 m), near the center of the range, and the twin pyramids of Mosca Peak (9,509 ft; 2,898 m) and Guadalupe Peak (9,450 ft; 2,880 m). The last two are the most easily recognized peaks in the range as viewed from Albuquerque. Manzano Peak and Guadalupe Peak are the most dramatic in the range in terms of local relief and steepness; however, there are few cliffs in the range, as compared to the more dramatic Sandia Mountains.

Manzano Peak and the crest and western slopes of the range are included in the Manzano Wilderness which comprises 36,875 acres (14,923 ha) and is 17 miles (27 km) north to south and 3–5 miles (4.8–8.0 km) east-west. There are 64 miles (103 km) of trails in the wilderness, including the 22 mile Crest Trail which traverses the highest part of the range.

The Manzano Mountains are the southern part of a larger geologic unit known as the Sandia–Manzano Mountains, which are an east-tilted fault-block range forming part of the eastern edge of the Albuquerque Basin in the Rio Grande rift. They are separated from the Sandia Mountains to the north by the Manzanita Mountains and Tijeras Canyon. Both the Manzano and Sandia mountains are capped by Paleozoic sedimentary rocks, with Proterozoic metamorphic rocks making up most of the mountains' steep western faces. These include the Sevilleta metarhyolite, with an age of 1665 ±16 Ma.

The southern part of the Manzano Mountains is in the Mountainair Ranger District while much of the northern part is in the Sandia Ranger District of the Cibola National Forest.

On September 14, 1977, a USAF Boeing EC-135 crashed into the Manzano Mountains just after takeoff from the Albuquerque International Sunport, killing all 20 people on board.

Compared to the Sandias, the Manzanos are much less visited, lacking the paved road and tramway access of their northern neighbors. However, many recreational sites exist, with opportunities for picnicking, camping, mountain biking, and hiking. The most well-known is Fourth of July Canyon which is noted for its Bigtooth Maple trees (Acer grandidentatum), especially when they change color in the Fall.
