= Moreno Hill Formation =

Geologic formation in western New Mexico

- Stratigraphic range: Turonian–Coniacian
- Type: Geological formation
- Underlies: Fence Lake Formation
- Overlies: Atarque Sandstone
- Thickness: 217 meters (712 ft)

Lithology
- Primary: Sandstone, Shale
- Other: Siltstone, Coal

Location
- Coordinates: 34.5893°N 108.7592°W
- Region: New Mexico
- Country: United States

Type section
- Named for: Moreno Hill
- Named by: McLellan, Haschke, Robinson, Carter, and Medlin
- Year defined: 1983
- Moreno Hill Formation (the United States) Moreno Hill Formation (New Mexico)

The Moreno Hill Formation is a geological formation in western New Mexico whose strata were deposited in the Late Cretaceous. Dinosaur remains are among the fossils that have been recovered from the formation. The age of the formation is dated between approximately 90.9 to 88.6 million years ago based on detrital zircons.

== Description ==
The formation is a nonmarine coal-bearing formation composed mostly of sandstone and shale with minor siltstone. The shales are brownish gray in color, and the sandstones are discontinuous beds of very pale orange to light brown poorly sorted grains that usually show steep crossbedding. The sandstones are interpreted as channel or splay deposits in a fluvial environment. The shales include thin lenses of bituminous coal, including tonsteins (distinctive thin ash beds). The total maximum thickness is 217 meters (712 ft). It overlies the Atarque Sandstone and is in turn overlain by the Fence Lake Formation.

Moreno Hill Formation was first named by McLellan and coinvestigators in 1983 for exposures around Moreno Hill in the Salt Lake coal field of western New Mexico. The beds were originally mapped as Mesaverde Group, but were found to be much lower in the stratigraphic column. The formation is also laterally equivalent to the Tres Hermanos Formation, Pescado Tongue of the Mancos Shale, Gallup Sandstone, and lower Crevasse Canyon Formation. It represents beds southwest of the pinchout of the Pescado Tongue where the Tres Hermanos Formation and Gallup Sandstone are no longer lithologically distinguishable. It also documents a time of tectonic upheaval, volcanic activities, humid paleoclimate, and North American coastal margin shifts.

== Fossil content ==
Moreno Hill Formation was originally thought to be devoid of fossils, but it has since yielded a diverse vertebrate paleofauna, including four genera of dinosaurs. An indeterminate crocodyliform fossil has been reported. Coalified and permineralized fossil wood are also common in this formation, including those of gymnosperms and angiosperms.

=== Vertebrate fossils ===
==== Fish ====
Fish of the Moreno Hill Formation
Genus	Species	Presence	Material	Notes	Images
Amiidae	indet.		Amiid teeth	Had been tentatively classified as Melvius sp. by Wolfe and Kirkland (1998)	
Lepisosteidae	indet.		Gar scales	Had been tentatively classified as Lepisosteus sp. by Wolfe and Kirkland (1998)	

==== Dinosaurs ====
Dinosaurs of the Moreno Hill Formation
Genus	Species	Presence	Material	Description	Images
Ankylosauria indet.	Indeterminate		Teeth (specimens MSM P15742 and MSM P15743).	Ankylosaur teeth.	
Jeyawati	J. rugoculus			A basal hadrosauromorph.	
Nothronychus	N. mckinleyi		"Teeth, fragmentary skull bones, cervical and other vertebrae, scapula, partial forelimb and hindlimb."	A therizinosaur.	
Suskityrannus	S. hazelae		Partial skull & skeleton.	A tyrannosauroid.	
Zuniceratops	Z. christopheri		"Partial cranial and postcranial materials of five individuals."	A ceratopsian.	

==== Testudines ====
Testudines of the Moreno Hill Formation
Genus	Species	Presence	Material	Notes	Images
Edowa	E. zuniensis			A baenid.	
Naomichelys	N. sp.			A helochelydrid.	
Trionychidae				An indeterminate trionychid.	

=== Paleoflora ===
Plants of the Moreno Hill Formation
Genus	Species	Presence	Material	Notes	Images
Paraphyllanthoxylon	P. arizonense				
Herendeenoxylon	H. zuniense				
Vasunum	V. cretaceum				

== See also ==
- List of dinosaur-bearing rock formations
  - List of stratigraphic units with few dinosaur genera
