= Atarque Sandstone =

Geologic formation in New Mexico

- Stratigraphic range: Turonian
- Type: Formation
- Underlies: Moreno Hill Formation
- Overlies: Rio Salado Tongue, Mancos Shale
- Thickness: 100 feet (30 m)

Lithology
- Primary: Sandstone
- Other: Shale

Location
- Coordinates: 35.131797°N 108.651864°W
- Region: New Mexico
- Country: United States

Type section
- Named for: Atarque settlement
- Named by: W.S. Pike, Jr.
- Year defined: 1947
- Atarque Sandstone (the United States) Atarque Sandstone (New Mexico)

The Atarque Sandstone is a geologic formation in New Mexico. It preserves fossils dating back to the late Cretaceous period.

== Description ==
The formation consists of very fine to fine buff fossiliferous sandstone with a maximum thickness of 100 feet (30 m). The beds are flat, massive and have low-angle crossbedding. The formation intertongues with the underlying Rio Salado Tongue of the Mancos Shale and is overlain by either the Carthage Member of the Tres Hermanos Formation or the Moreno Hill Formation. It was deposited during the early to middle Turonian Age of the late Cretaceous.

The formation is interpreted as a coastal barrier sandstone deposited by a regression of the Western Interior Seaway to the northeast.

== Fossils ==
The formation contains fossil pelecypods and plesiosaur vertebra. It also contains fossils of the ammonite Spathites rioensis characteristic of the middle Turonian.

== History of investigation ==
The unit was first defined as the Atarque Member of the Mesaverde Formation by W.S. Pike in 1947. Pike assigned the lowermost 127 feet (39 m) of the Mesaverde in the San Juan Basin to the unit. S.C. Hook and coinvestigators revised the Cretaceous stratigraphy of the San Juan and Zuni basins in 1983 and assigned both Pike's Atarque Member and beds in the Zuni Basin assigned to the lower Gallup Sandstone to the Tres Hermanos Formation. The Atarque Member was redefined as the lower sandstone beds of the Tres Hermanos Formation. Simultaneously, M.W. McLellan and coinvestigators raised the Atarque to formation rank as the Atarque Sandstone in the Salt Lake coal field of west-central New Mexico.

== See also ==
- List of fossiliferous stratigraphic units in New Mexico
- Paleontology in New Mexico
