= Fence Lake Formation =

Geologic formation in western New Mexico

- Stratigraphic range: 14.5–7 Ma
- Type: Geological formation
- Underlies: Quemado Formation
- Overlies: Moreno Hill Formation
- Thickness: 230 feet (70 m)

Lithology
- Primary: Sandstone, conglomerate

Location
- Coordinates: 34.6009°N 108.6756°W
- Region: New Mexico
- Country: United States

Type section
- Named for: Fence Lake, New Mexico
- Named by: McLellan, Haschke, Robinson, Carter, and Medlin
- Year defined: 1982
- Fence Lake Formation (the United States) Fence Lake Formation (New Mexico)

The Fence Lake Formation is a geological formation in western New Mexico whose strata were deposited in the Miocene.

== Description ==
The formation consists of two informal members. The lower member is 60 feet (18 m) of coarse conglomerate consisting mostly of fragments of volcanic rock. The upper member is 180 feet (55 m) of calcareous grayish-pink sandstone, poorly sorted and very fine- to coarse-grained. The upper member also includes scattered lenses of conglomerate.

The formation unconformably overlies the Moreno Hill Formation. It is relatively resistant to erosion and so forms cliffs and shelves and caps mesas in the area. Drainages eroded through the formation are filled by younger beds of the Quemado Formation.

The formation is interpreted as fluvial deposits. The volcanic rock fragments making up the formation are thought to come from the Oligocene Mogollon-Datil volcanic field and the formation itself is thought to be Miocene in age. from before 14.5 to 7 million years old.

== History of investigation ==
The beds making up the unit were originally included in the Bidahochi Formation by Charles Repenning and James Irwin in 1954, along with all other Tertiary beds of the Zuni Plateau. In !956, R.J. Marr informally named the gravel beds of the lower member as the Fence Lake Gravel, and in 1958, Repenning, Lance, and Irwin excluded the high-level gravels near Fence Lake, New Mexico from the Bidahochi. In 1982, Marguerite McLellan and coinvestigators recognized that these beds were older than the beds inset in nearby drainages (identified at the time as Bidahochi Formation and later redefined as Quemado Formation) and defined them as the Fence Lake Formation.
