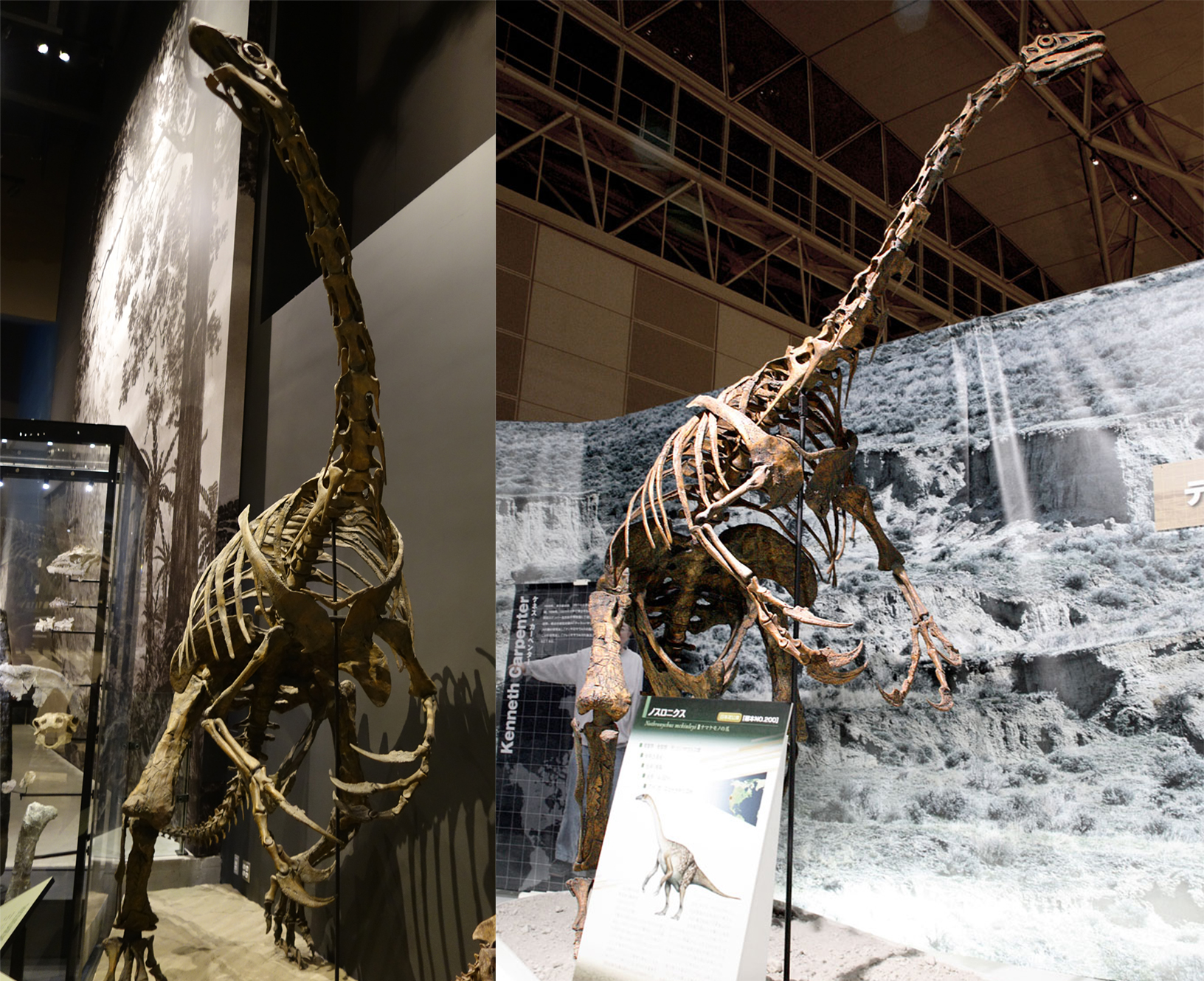
- Reconstructed skeletons of N. graffami (left) and N. mckinleyi (right)

Scientific classification
- Kingdom: Animalia
- Phylum: Chordata
- Class: Reptilia
- Clade: Dinosauria
- Clade: Saurischia
- Clade: Theropoda
- Superfamily: †Therizinosauroidea
- Family: †Therizinosauridae
- Genus: †Nothronychus; Kirkland & Wolfe, 2001

Type species
- †Nothronychus mckinleyi Kirkland & Wolfe, 2001

Other species
- †N. graffami Zanno et al., 2009

= Nothronychus =

Nothronychus Temporal range: Late Cretaceous (Turonian) 93.9–89.8 Ma

Extinct genus of dinosaurs

Nothronychus (meaning "slothful claw") is a genus of therizinosaurid theropod dinosaurs that lived in North America during the Late Cretaceous. The type species, Nothronychus mckinleyi, was described by James Kirkland and Douglas G. Wolfe in 2001. It was recovered near New Mexico's border with Arizona, in an area known as the Zuni Basin, from rocks assigned to the Moreno Hill Formation, dating to the Turonian stage of the Late Cretaceous. A second specimen, described in 2009 as a second species, Nothronychus graffami, was found in the Tropic Shale of Utah, dating to between one million and 500,000 years older than N. mckinleyi.

Like other therizinosaurids, Nothronychus was likely a bulky herbivore with wide, sloth-like hips (resembling those of the unrelated ornithischians), feet with four forward-facing toes, elongated necks, and prominent arms with sharp claws. Both species were similar in dimensions, but N. graffami was slightly more robust than N. mckinleyi.

== History of discovery ==
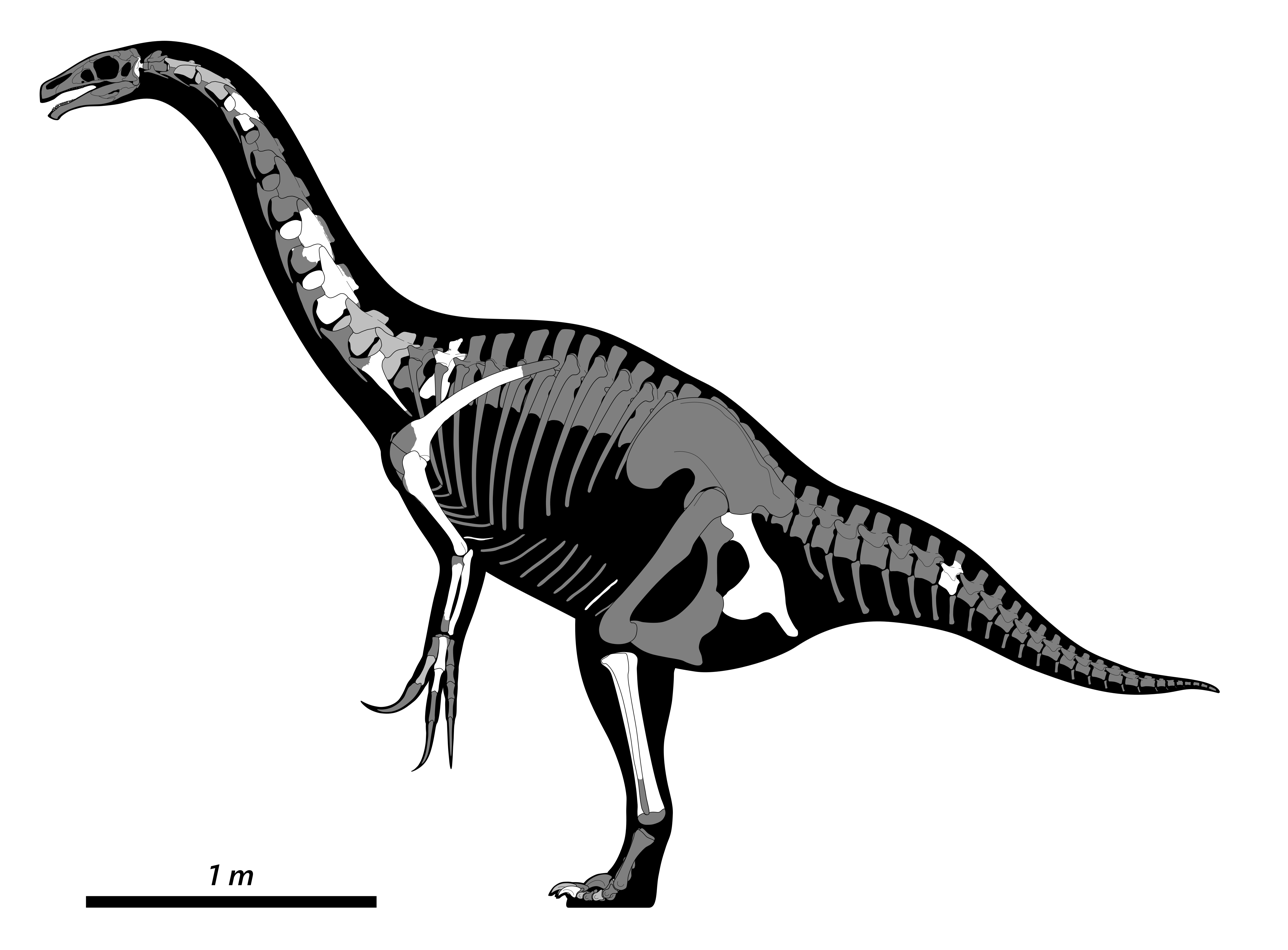
Reconstructed skeleton of N. mckinleyi

The first fossil evidence later attributed to Nothronychus was discovered by a team of paleontologists working in the Zuni Basin of New Mexico at the Haystack Butte site, Moreno Hill Formation. A therizinosaur ischium (a hip bone) had originally been mistaken for a squamosal, a part of the skull crest of the newly discovered ceratopsian Zuniceratops. However, closer examination revealed the true identity of the bone, and soon more parts of the skeleton were found. The New Mexico team, led by paleontologists Jim Kirkland and Doug Wolfe, published their find in the Journal of Vertebrate Paleontology on 22 August 2001, making it the type specimen of the new species Nothronychus mckinleyi. The Arizona Republic newspaper, however, was first to announce the name on 19 June 2001, in a column by R.E. Molnar. The generic name, Nothronychus, is derived from Greek νωθρός (nothros, meaning slothful) and ὄνυξ (onyx, meaning claw). The specific name, mckinleyi, honours rancher Bobby McKinley on whose land the fossil findings were made. The holotype, specimen MSM P2106, consists of very sparse skull fragments, a braincase, some vertebrae and parts of the shoulder girdle, forelimbs, pelvis and hindlimbs.

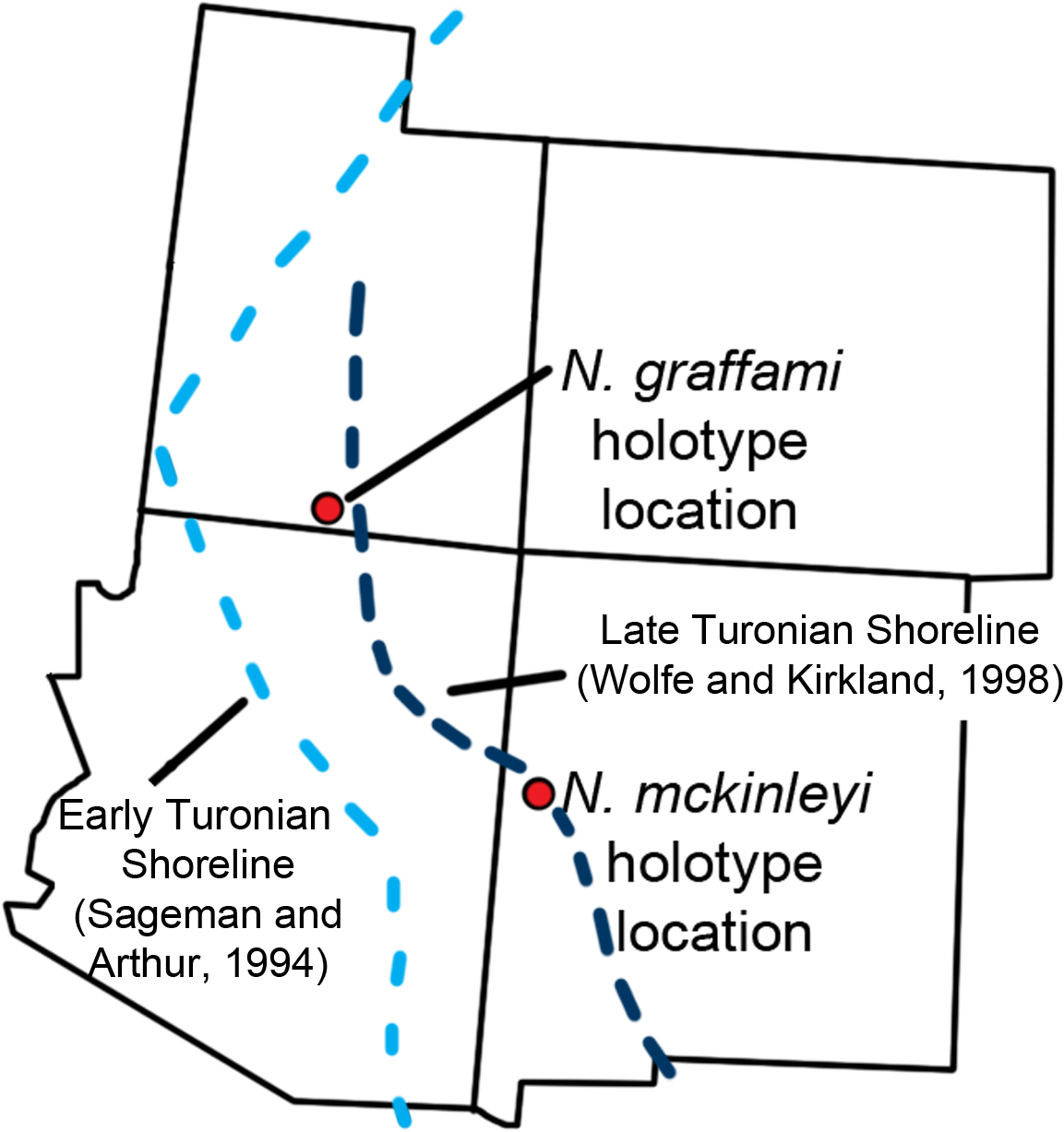
Localities where MSM P2106 and UMNH VP 16420 have been found

A second, more complete specimen, UMNH VP 16420, was discovered from the Tropic Shale Formation (dating to the early Turonian stage) of southern Utah in 2000 by Merle Graffam, a resident of Big Water, Utah. The area around Big Water had been subject to several expeditions by teams from the Museum of Northern Arizona (MNA), and was known for its abundance of marine reptile fossils, especially plesiosaurs. During part of the late Cretaceous period, the region had been submerged under a shallow sea, the Western Interior Seaway, and preserves extensive marine deposits. Graffam's initial discovery (a large, isolated toe bone) came as a surprise to colleagues, as it clearly belonged to a land-dwelling dinosaur, rather than a plesiosaur. However, the location of the bone at the time would have been nearly 100 kilometres (62 miles) from the Cretaceous shoreline. An excavation of the area by an MNA crew revealed more of the skeleton, and the scientists found that it was a therizinosaur, and the first example of that group to be found in the Americas. All previous therizinosaur fossils had come from China and Mongolia. Between both species, N. graffami is the most complete but lacks the skull.

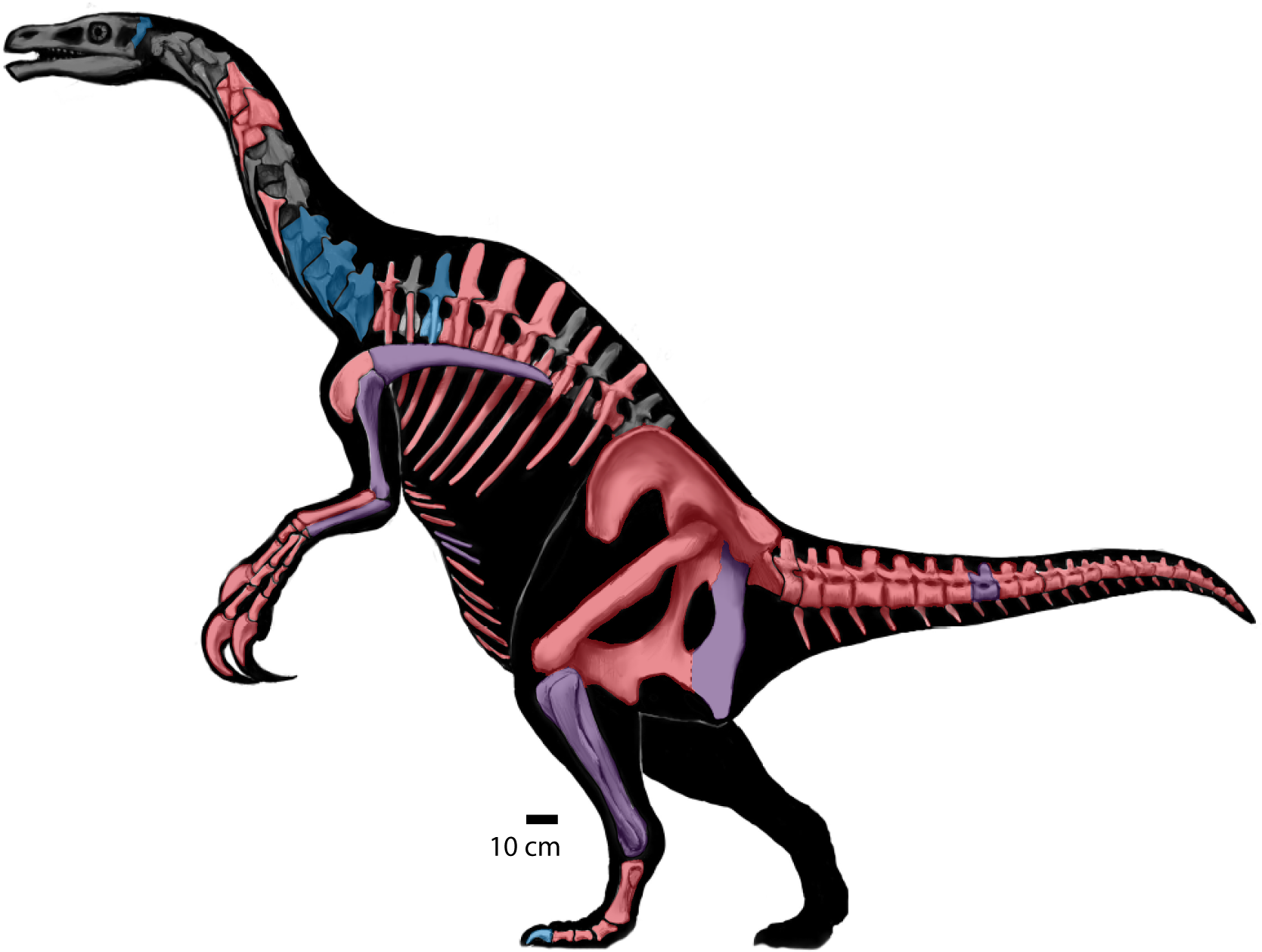
Known elements of N. mckinleyi (blue), N. graffami (red) and both species (purple)

The Utah specimen studied by the MNA team was found to be closely related to N. mckinleyi, though it differed in build (being heavier) and age (about half a million years older). The MNA specimen was first announced in two 2002 talks during the 54th meeting of the Rocky Mountain Geological Society of America. It was later discussed in an issue of Arizona Geology as a distinct species from N. mckinleyi, but not named. The specimen was classified and named as the new species Nothronychus graffami by Lindsay Zanno and colleagues in the journal Proceedings of the Royal Society B on 15 July 2009. N. graffami was named for Graffam, who discovered the original specimens. A reconstructed skeleton of N. graffami went on display at the MNA in September 2007. In 2015, Hedrick and colleagues conducted a large osteological revision of both species and their respective specimens concluding that Nothronychus was one of the most complete and well-known therizinosaurids.

== Description ==
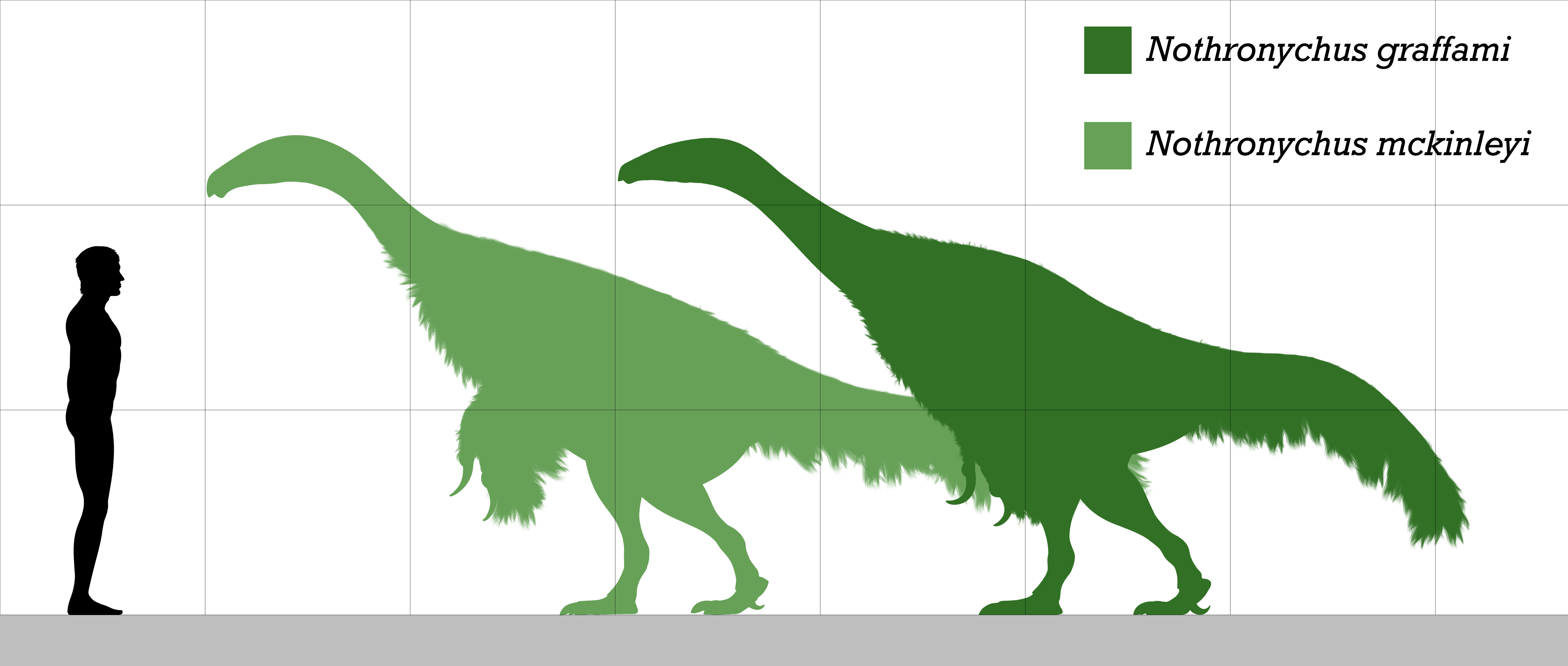
Size of N. mckinleyi and N. graffami compared to a human

Nothronychus is a medium-sized therizinosaur, measuring 4.2–5.3 m (14–17 ft) long and weighing 800–1,200 kg (1,800–2,600 lb). Nothronychus had large "pot-bellied" abdomens, long necks, and stocky hindlimbs with four-toed feet. Its arms were relatively large with dexterous hands equipped with up to 30 cm (12 in) long curved and sharply-pointed claws on their fingers. In addition, the tail was reduced in length but more flexible.

The genus Nothronychus can be distinguished from other therizinosaur taxa based on several features: a distinctly subcircular obturator process, an elongated obturator foramen towards the bottom, the contact area between pubis and ischium restricted to the upper half of the obturator projection, and deep cut between towards the bottom facet of the obturator process and frontal ischial shaft.

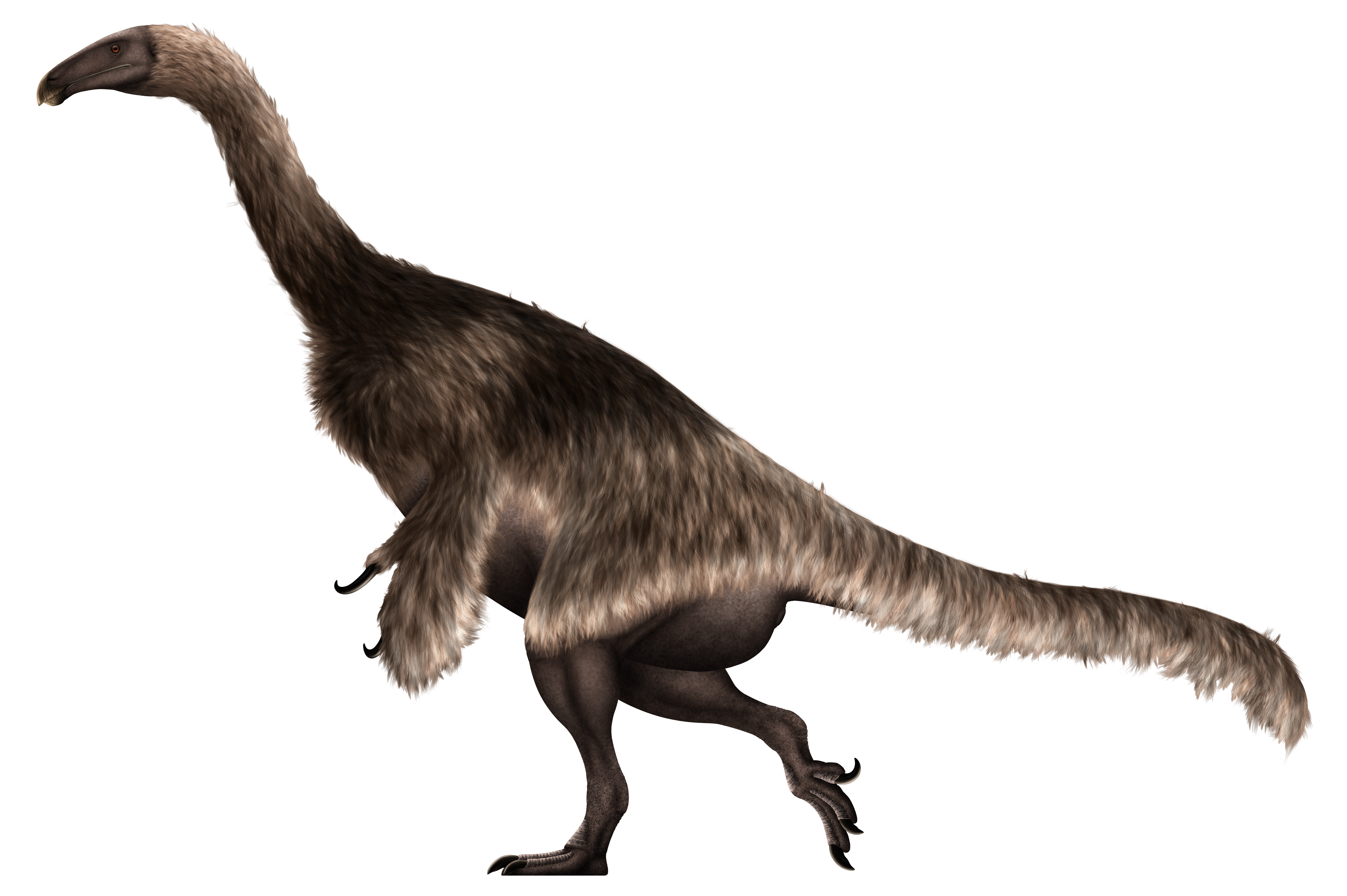
Restoration of N. mckinleyi

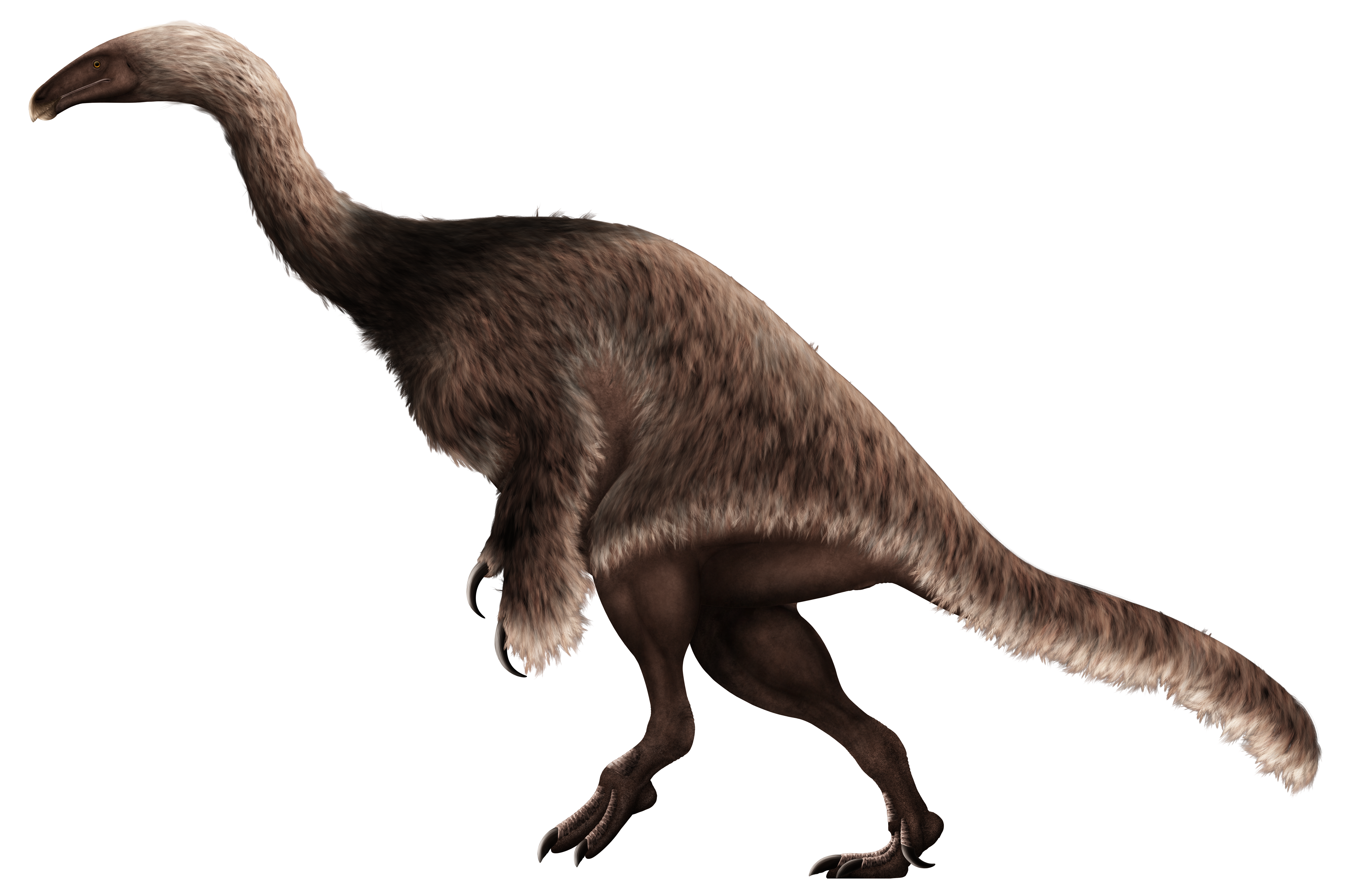
Restoration of N. graffami

Both species, N. mckinleyi and N. graffami, are known from mature specimens of similar size, as evidenced by the fusion of the neural spines and scapulocoracoid. They have roughly equal sized humeri (upper arm), measuring 41.5 cm (16.3 in) and 42.4 cm (16.7 in) in length respectively, though N. mckinleyi was different from N. graffami in being slightly less robust as well as details of the tail vertebrae, and a more bent ulna (lower arm bone).

== Classification ==
Nothronychus were members of the Coelurosauria, the theropod group composed mainly by carnivorous dinosaurs. However, more specifically, Nothronychus form part of the sub-group Maniraptora, theropods which evolved into partial omnivores and, in the case of Nothronychus and their family, plant-eaters. Nothronychus mckinleyi was in 2001 assigned to the Therizinosauridae given the derived features of the genus. In 2010, Lindsay E. Zanno performed a large and comprehensive analysis of the Therizinosauria. The cladistic analysis performed recovered both N. mckinleyi and N. graffami as a sister group. Most of the data provided by Zanno was used by Hartman and colleagues in 2019 during an extensive phylogenetic analysis for the Coelurosauria. Nothronychus was recovered as a therizinosaurid taxon with both species in derived positions. Below are the obtained results for the Therizinosauridae:

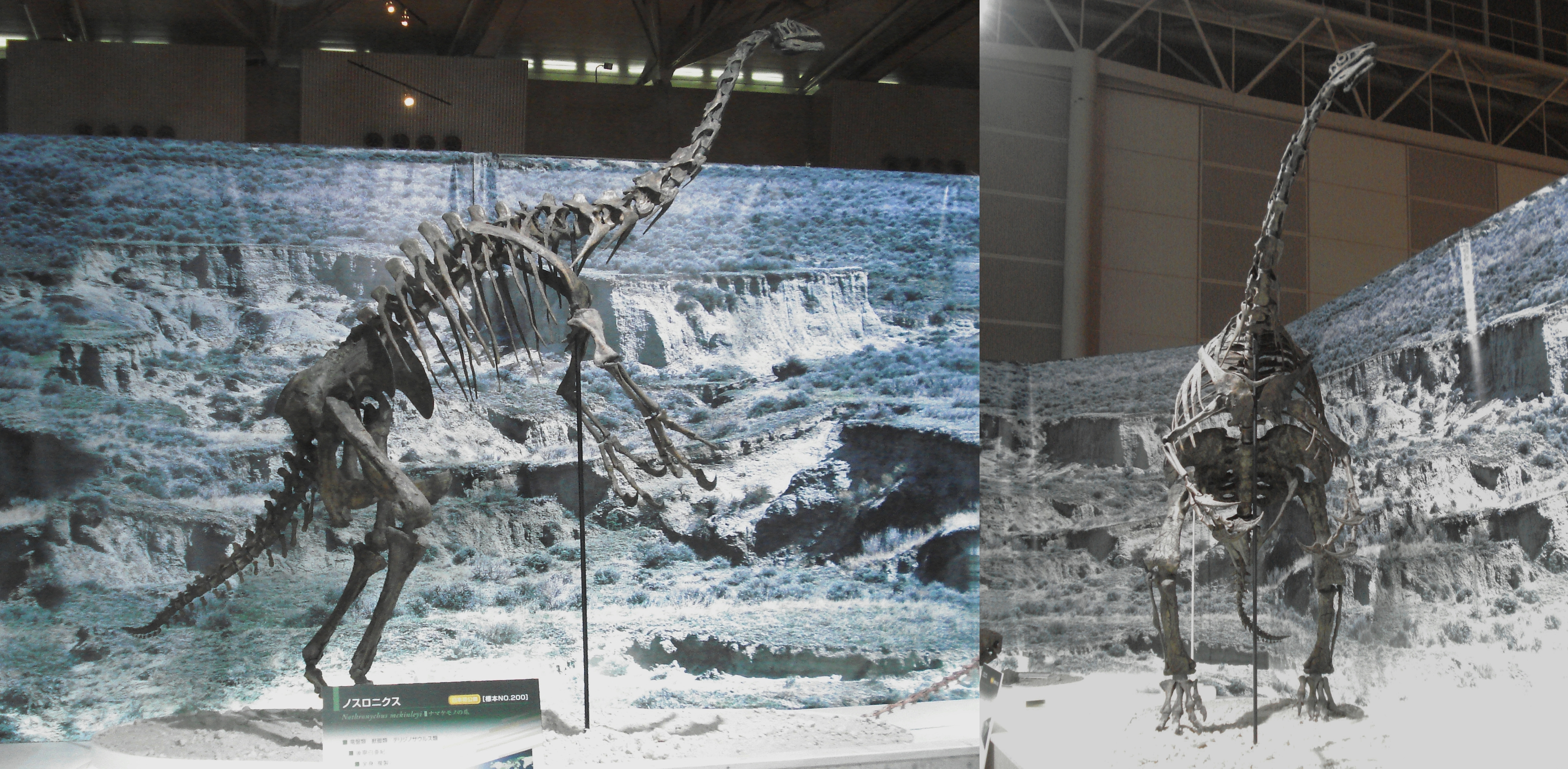
N. mckinleyi skeleton in side and front views

- Therizinosauridae
  - - Suzhousaurus
    - - Neimongosaurus
      - - Therizinosaurus
        - Erliansaurus
  - - Nanchao embryos
    - - Nanshiungosaurus
      - - - Segnosaurus
          - AMNH 6368
        - - - Erlikosaurus
            - Nothronychus mckinleyi
            - Nothronychus graffami

== Paleobiology ==
=== Feeding ===
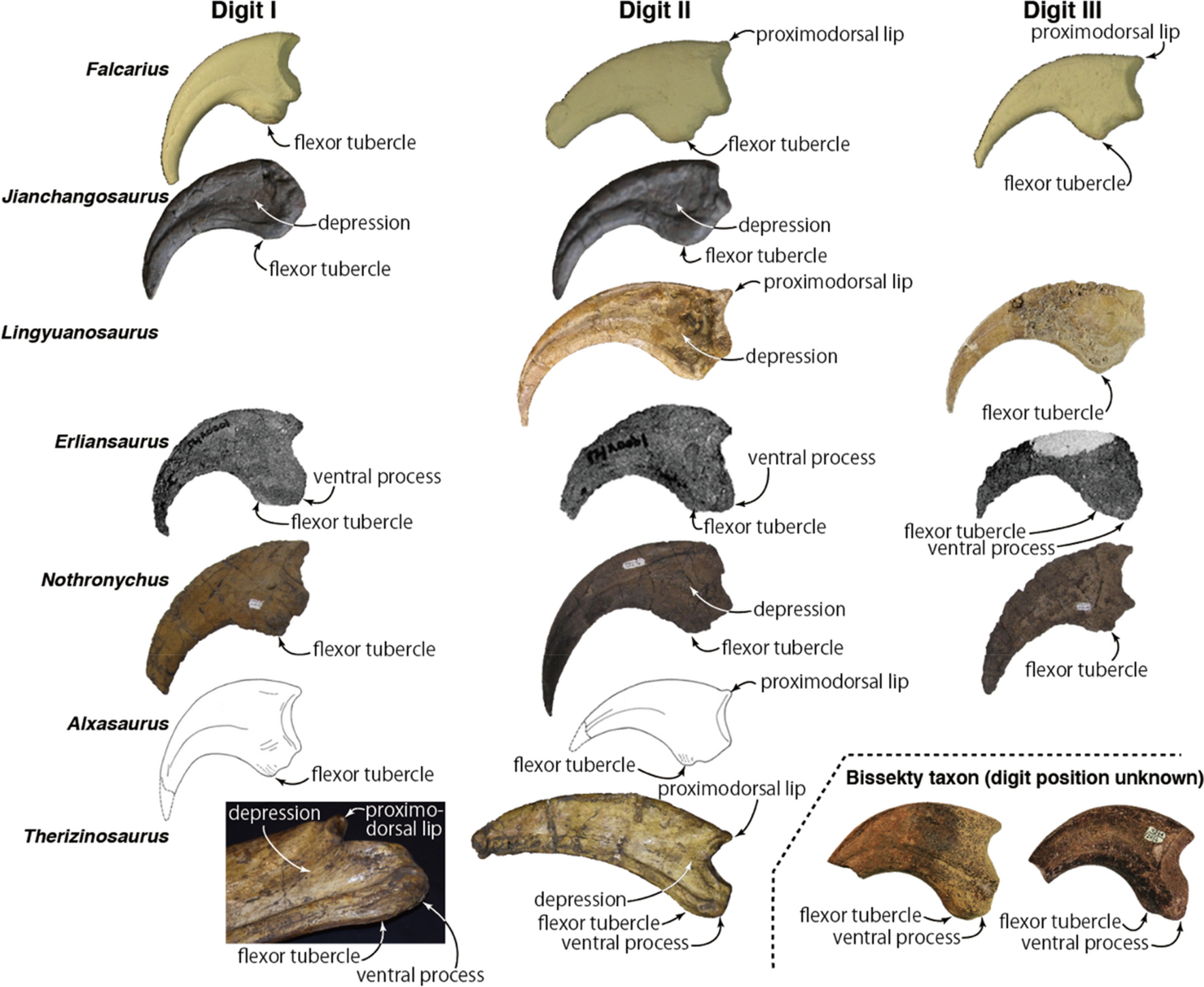
Comparison of hand claws of several therizinosaurs, including N. graffami

In 2009, Zanno and colleagues stated therizinosaurs were the most-widely regarded candidates for herbivory among theropods based on the small, densely packed, coarse serrations; lance-shaped teeth with a relatively low replacement rate; a well-developed keratinous beak; long neck for browsing; relatively small skulls; a very large gut capacity as indicated by the rib circumference at the trunk and the outwards flaring processes of the ilia; and the notable lack of cursorial adaptations in the hind limbs. All of these features suggest that members of this family feed on vegetation, as well as pre-processing it within their mouths to begin the breakdown of cellulose and lignin. This is perhaps even more so true for therizinosaurids, which seem to have further exploited these characters. One of the most notable adaptations in advanced therizinosaurids are the four-toed feet, which had a fully functional, weight-bearing first digit that was likely adapted to slow life-style. Zanno and colleagues found that Ornithomimosauria, Therizinosauria, and Oviraptorosauria had either direct or morphological evidence for herbivory, which would mean either this diet evolved independently multiple times in coelurosaurian theropods or that the primitive condition of the group was at least facultative herbivory with carnivory only emerging in more derived maniraptorans.

In 2014, Lautenschlager tested the biomechanical function of multiple therizinosaur claws. He noted that the hands of some therizinosaurids (such as Nothronyhus or Therizinosaurus) were more effective when piercing or pulling down vegetation. The arms would have had to be able to extend the range of the animal to a point that could not be reached by the head if they were used for browsing and pulling down vegetation. In genera where both neck and forelimb elements are preserved, however, the necks were equal in length or longer than the forelimbs, so pulling vegetation would only be likely if lower parts of long branches were pulled down to access out-of-reach vegetation. Lautenschlager also found that therizinosaurid claws would not have been used for digging, which would have been done with the foot claws because, since as in other maniraptorans, feathers on the forelimbs would have interfered with this function. Additionally, this action leads to a higher stress tension on the dorsal area of the claw−this is more evident in Therizinosaurus. However, he could neither confirm nor disregard that the hand claws could have been fully used for sexual display, self-defense, intraspecific competition, mate-gripping during mating or grasping stabilization when foraging. In 2024, Smith and Gillette claimed that Nothronychus is herbivorous on the basis of retroverted pubis, analogous with the postacetabular bar of ornithischians, and that many characters of Nothronychus including the pubic condition are absent in earlier therizinosaurs like Falcarius, so such structures would have evolved multiple times throughout the maniraptoran lineage.

=== Myology ===
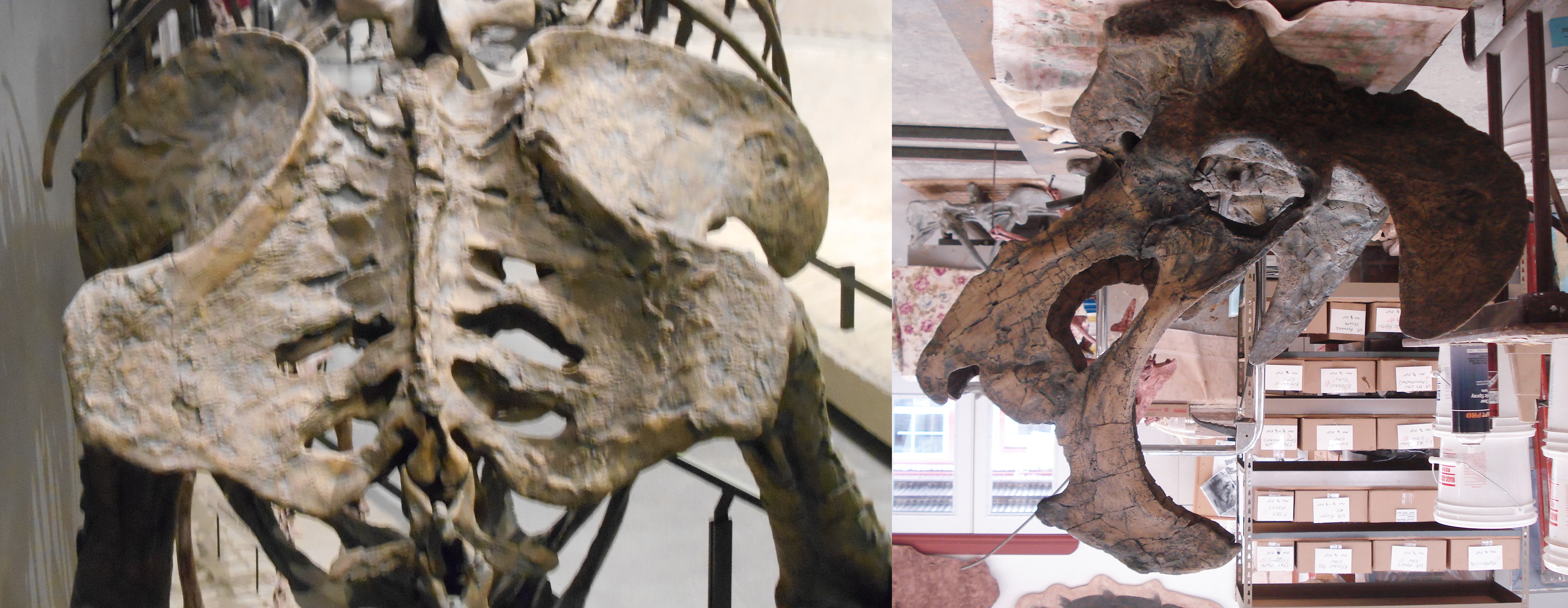
Pelvis cast of N. graffami in rear and side views

In 2015, Smith studied the myology and functional morphology of the craniocervical junction of N. mckinleyi. The craniocervical muscles can be subdivided into functional groups as dorsiflexors, lateroflexors, and ventroflexors. Lateroflexors and dorsiflexors in Nothronychus are relatively reduced but are still well-developed, while ventroflexors allow increased ventroflexion. With small neural spines relative to the long S-shaped neck, its neck pattern was similar to that of ostriches and Diplodocus. Its individual centra didn't have high degree of freedom and likely had little apparent movement, meaning that the total neck movement would have only been resulted by the combined effect of all cervical vertebrae.

In 2021, he also reconstructed the forelimb musculature of both species in the same year. As predicted for derived non-avian theropod dinosaurs, the forelimbs likely had no increase in range of motion within them. The distal humerus contained a well-developed fossa brachialis, and the proximal humerus may have had a fossa pneumotricipitales; the deflected epicleidium of the furcula is a development yet to be described in other theropods. Other forelimb musculature were similar to dromaeosaurs, such as the pectoral girdle being similar to that of velociraptorines. The supracoracoideus and pectoralis muscles were characterised by antagonistic moment arms in Nothronychus.

In the same year, Smith reconstructed the hindlimb musculature of N. graffami. Nothronychus had a pelvis that is incipiently opisthopubic, which Smith expects to be associated with the muscular system's extensive modification. His reconstruction of the muscular system revealed that the musculature of Nothronychus to a certain extent is convergent with birds because of the retroverted pubis that becomes fused with the ischium, and because of the synsacrum and pes similar to that of birds. It also showed that its musculature was not only convergent with birds, but also with ornithischians, indicating that some maniraptorans' retroverted pubis and the ornithischians' postacetabular bar are analogous structures. A 2023 study by Smith and Gillette suggests that much of the walking motion for N. graffami took place at the knee when moving, with movement at the femur limited. This same study also suggests a waddling gait for Nothronychus, and a digitigrade stance, though plantigrade walking could not entirely be ruled out.

=== Senses and breathing ===
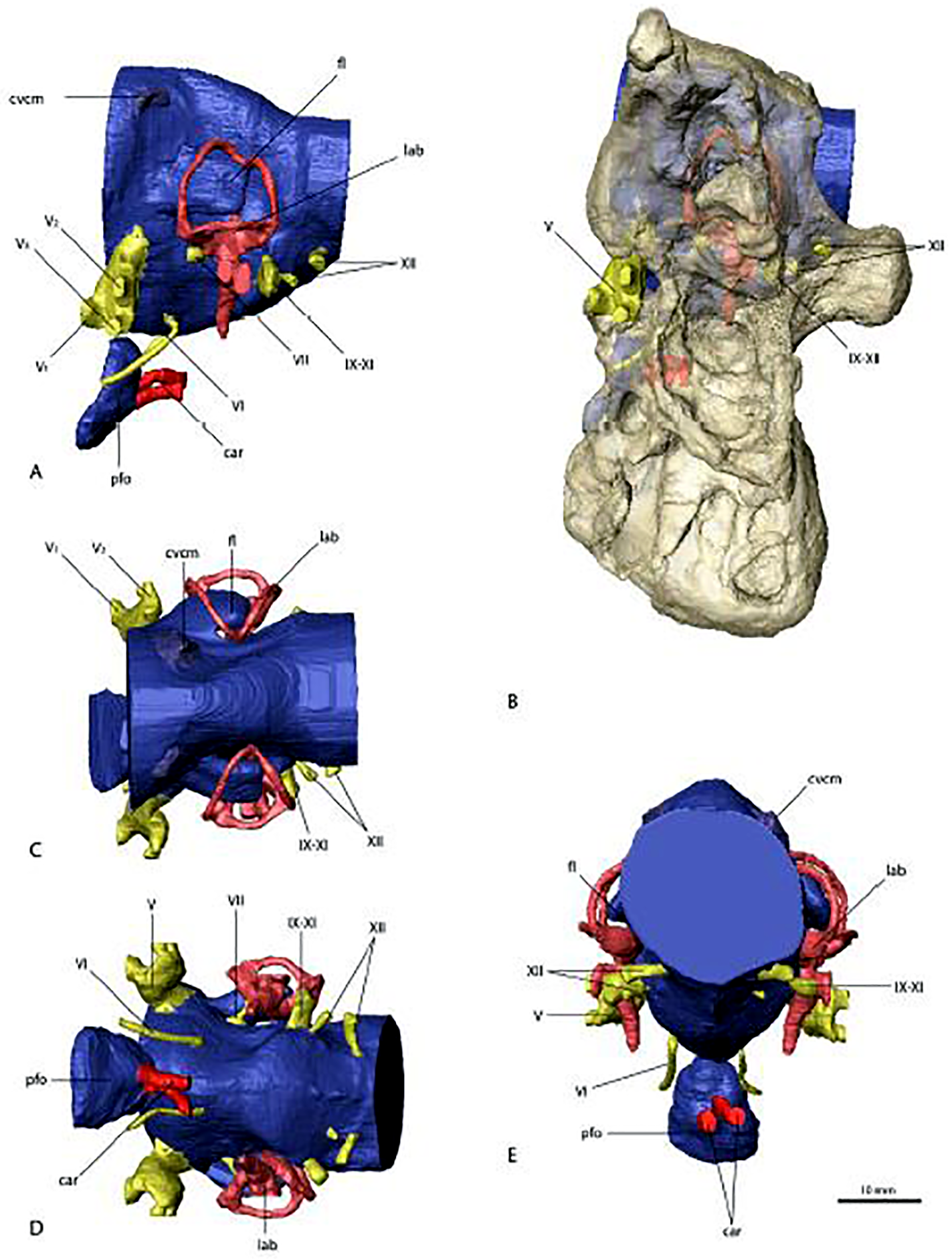
Cranial endocast of N. mckinleyi

In 2012, paleontologist Stephan Lautenschlager and team examined the endocasts (brain cavity) of several therizinosaurs (including N. mckinleyi), concluding that most members had well developed senses of smell, hearing, and balance, mostly useful for foraging. The enlarged forebrain of therizinosaurs may also have been useful in complex social behavior and predator evasion. These senses were also well-developed in earlier coelurosaurs and other theropods, indicating that therizinosaurs may have inherited many of these traits from their carnivorous ancestors and used them for their different and specialized dietary purposes.

In 2018, the holotype braincase of Nothronychus mckinleyi was re-examined by Smith and colleagues updating numerous basicranial and soft-tissues aspects. They noted that the braincase has particularly large pneumatic chambers on the sensorial areas, suggesting that the increased tympanic systems would result in optimal low frequency sound reception, possibly infrasound, and in complex social behavior. The enlarged cochlea and presence of enlarged pneumatic chambers near the middle ear also supports this insight. Smith and colleagues established an average hearing frequency of 1100 to 1450 Hz and upper limits of 3000 to 3700 Hz. They stated, however, that these estimates could be slightly exaggerated. Also, N. mckinleyi retained elongated semicircular canals in the ear, which are more related to an active, predatory life-style. This trait indicates that most therizinosaurids (possibly all therizinosaurs) retained the ancestral, carnivorous ear configuration−previously suggested for Erlikosaurus. Finally, based on Erlikosaurus, N. mckinleyi may have had a relatively horizontal head posture, which is associated with overlapping visual fields and binocular vision, given the orientation of the horizontal semicircular canal relative to the horizontal orientation of the occipital condyle.

In 2021, Smith and colleagues examined the pneumaticity of both species' specimens. The axial skeleton ("the basicranium, the presacral vertebrae, and the proximal caudal vertebrae") shows extensive pneumatization, meaning that this body part of Nothronychus had extensive air sacs. The synsacrum and ilium is not pneumatized, so the air sac may have bypassed the synsacrum. The researchers considered that the pneumatization in therizinosaurs wouldn't have been related to weight reduction or thermoregulation, but to an avian-style respiratory system. With lungs attached to the dorsal vertebrae, Nothronychus might have had a respiratory system similar to that of birds, probably having an "avian-style unidirectional airflow with cross-current blood/oxygen exchange." Unlike birds, however, the clavicular air sac of Nothronychus might have been reduced or just absent, evidenced by the lack of pneumatic furcula or appendicular elements. Its ribs also show no sign of uncinate processes.

== Paleoenvironment ==
Specimens of Nothronychus are known from the Moreno Hill Formation which documents a time of tectonic upheaval, volcanic activities, humid paleoclimate, and North American coastal margin shifts. Other dinosaurs fossils recovered from this formation are Suskityrannus, Zuniceratops, Jeyawati, and undescribed ankylosaur remains. Three groups of turtle fossils have been reported: a baenid Edowa, a helochelydrid Naomichelys and an indeterminate trionychid. Other vertebrate fossils include crocodyliform teeth, amiid teeth and gar scales.

== See also ==
- Timeline of therizinosaur research
