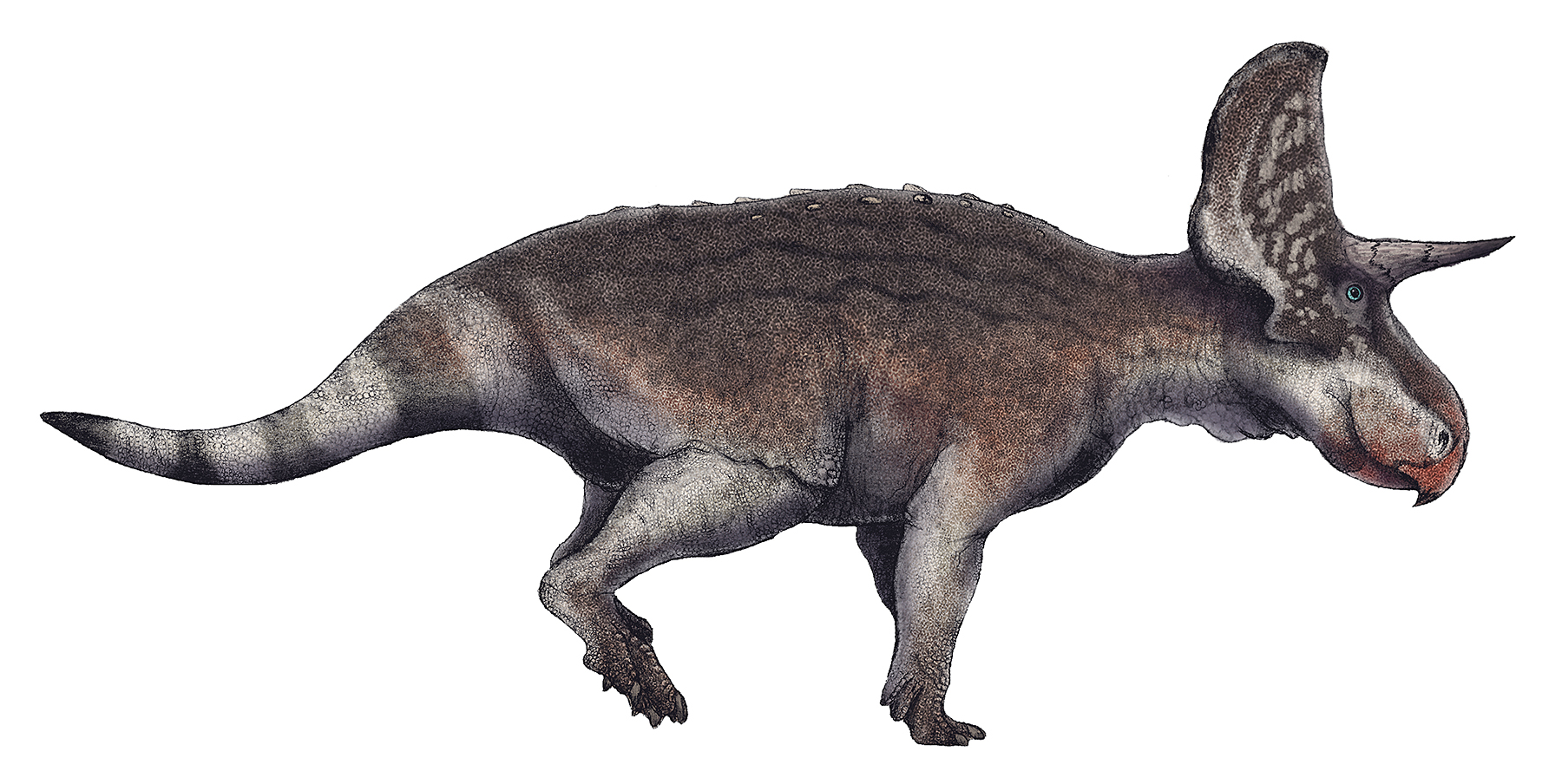
- Life restoration of Turanoceratops tardabilis

Scientific classification
- Domain: Eukaryota
- Kingdom: Animalia
- Phylum: Chordata
- Clade: Dinosauria
- Clade: †Ornithischia
- Clade: †Ceratopsia
- Clade: †Coronosauria
- Superfamily: †Ceratopsoidea
- Genus: †Turanoceratops; Nesov et al., 1989
- Species: †T. tardabilis

Binomial name
- †Turanoceratops tardabilis Nesov et al., 1989

= Turanoceratops =

Turanoceratops Temporal range: Turonian, 90 Ma

Extinct genus of dinosaurs

Turanoceratops ("Turan horned face") is a genus of herbivorous ceratopsian dinosaur from the late Cretaceous Bissekty Formation of Uzbekistan. The fossils dated from the mid-late Turonian stage, roughly 90 million years ago. The skull bore a pair of long brow horns like those seen in the Ceratopsidae, although Turanoceratops appears to have been transitional between earlier ceratopsians and ceratopsids, and not a ceratopsid itself.

== Discovery and naming ==
From the 1920s onwards, Soviet scientists discovered fragmentary fossils near Dzharakuduk in the district Navoi Viloyat, leading them to the conclusion that some ceratopsid must have been present. In 1988, paleontologist Lev Aleksandrovich Nesov based on these published the name Turanoceratops tardabilis, but did not provide a description so that for the time being it remained a nomen nudum. In 1989, Nesov, L.F. Kaznysjkina and Gennady Olegovich Cherepanov validly named the type species Turanoceratops tardabilis. The generic name is a combination of Turan, an old Persian name for Turkestan, the general region of the finds, and ~ceratops, "horned face", a usual suffix in ceratopian names. The specific name means "retarding" in Latin, referring to the protracted research.

The holotype, CCMGE No. 251/12457, consists of a damaged left maxilla, the tooth-bearing upper jaw bone. Other fossils have been referred but some of these later were proven to have belonged to other types of dinosaur. A braincase (specimen CCGME 628/12457) was shown to be of a sauropod. The material includes postorbitals with brow horn cores, a maxilla, teeth, a predentary and limb elements.

In 2004, Peter Dodson considered it a nomen dubium, but in 2009 Hans-Dieter Sues and Alexander Averianov concluded that it was a valid taxon.

== Description ==
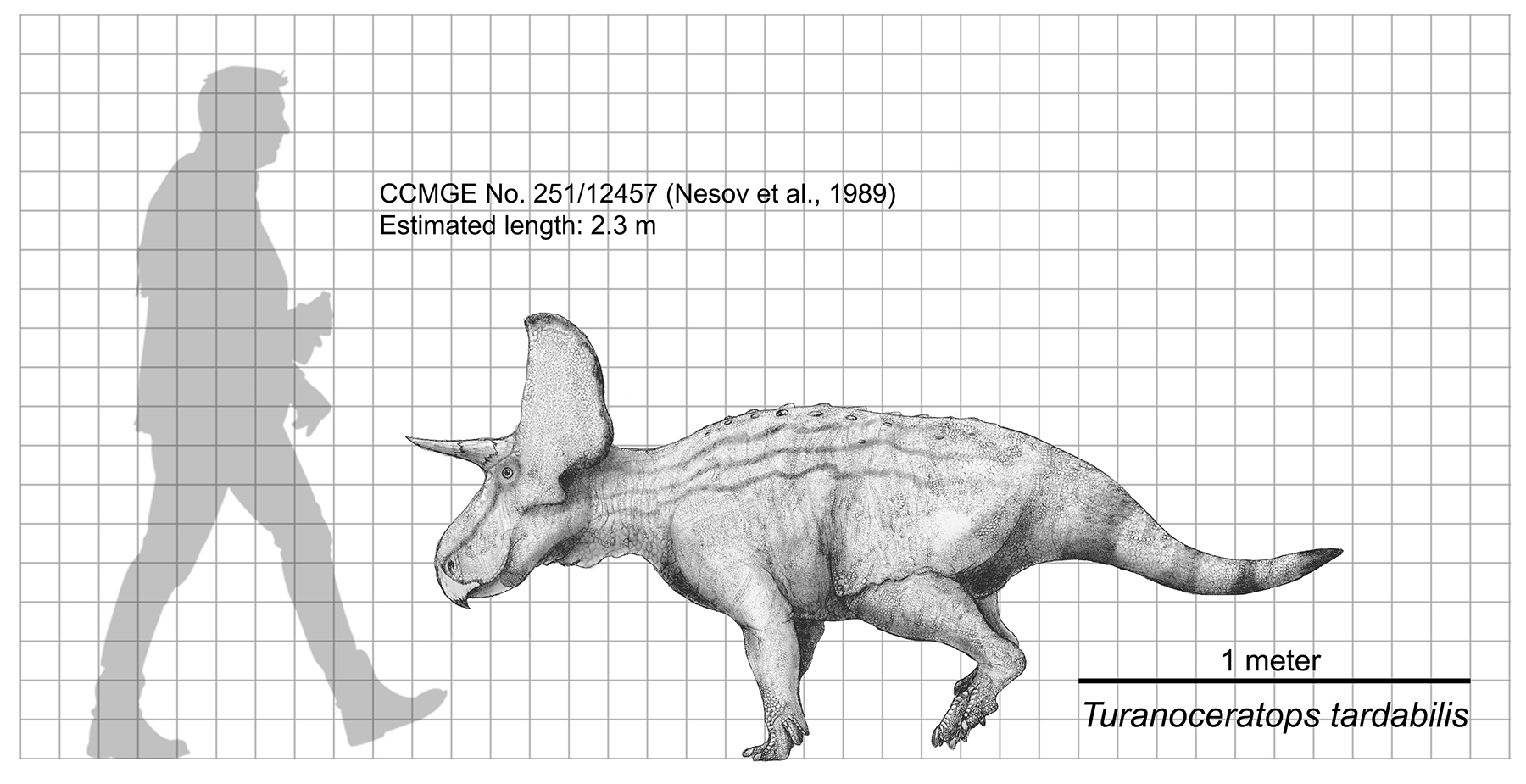
Size of Turanoceratops tardabilis compared to a human

Turanoceratops was a relatively small animal. In 2010, Gregory S. Paul estimated its length at 2 metres (6.6 ft) and its weight at 175 kilograms (386 lb).

Sues and Averianov in 2009 determined some typically basal traits, indicating a lower position in the evolutionary tree, and some more derived traits, showing a higher position. Basal traits are the variably developed secondary ridges on the tooth crowns and the possession of just two or three teeth per tooth position. Derived traits, relative to the more basal Zuniceratops, are the increase of the number of teeth to two or three and the possession of two roots per teeth. More general derived traits are the exclusion of the frontal bone from the upper rim of the eye socket and the presence of incipient cavities in the skull roof.

== Classification ==
Turanoceratops belonged to the Ceratopsia (the name is Greek for "horned face"), a group of herbivorous dinosaurs with parrot-like beaks which thrived in North America and Asia during the Cretaceous Period, which ended 66 million years ago. All ceratopsians became extinct at the end of this period. A 2009 study led by Hans-Dieter Sues analysed additional fossil material of Turanoceratops and concluded that, contrary to expectations, it represented a true (though "transitional") member of the family Ceratopsidae. If correct, it would represent an Asian ceratopsid. At the time of publication this would have been unique, as all other ceratopsids known to that point were from North America. Some scientists, such as Andrew Farke, disagreed with Sues' findings. Farke and colleagues ran an independent phylogenetic analysis of the new Turanoceratops fossils and found that it was a close relative of Ceratopsidae (the immediate sister group) but was not a true member of that clade. Sues and Alexander Averianov criticised that analysis, arguing that Farke and colleagues misinterpreted or mis-coded some characteristics of the fossil in their analysis. However, the describers of the only known Asian ceratopsid Sinoceratops conducted a phylogenetic analysis and concluded that Turanoceratops was more derived than Zuniceratops and was outside of Ceratopsidae, because it lacks several important synapomorphies of this group.

== Paleobiology ==
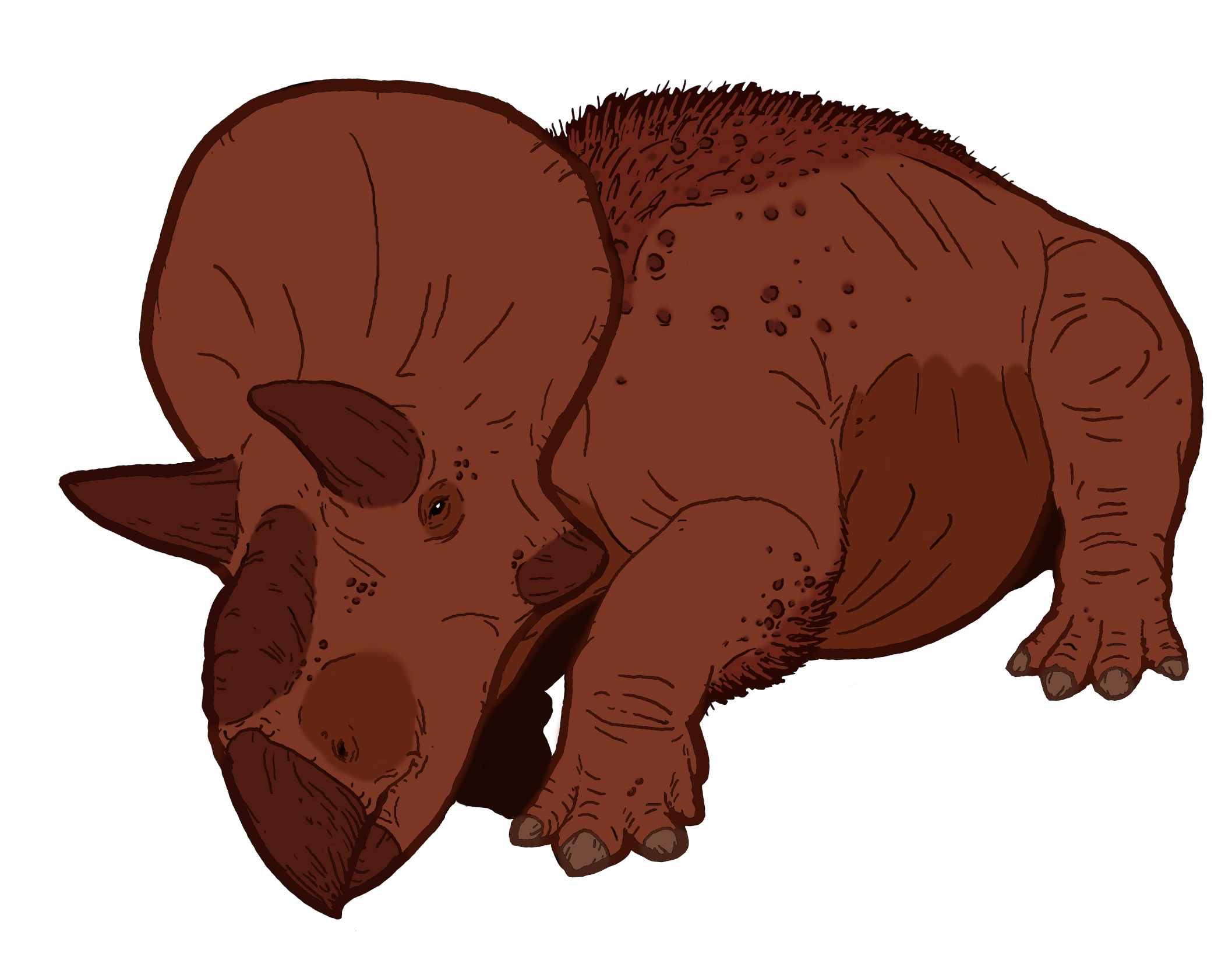
Restoration of a resting individual

Turanoceratops, like all ceratopsians, was a herbivore. During the Cretaceous, flowering plants were "geographically limited on the landscape", and so it is likely that this dinosaur fed on the predominant plants of the era: ferns and conifers. It would have used its sharp ceratopsian beak to bite off the leaves or needles.

== See also ==
- Timeline of ceratopsian research
