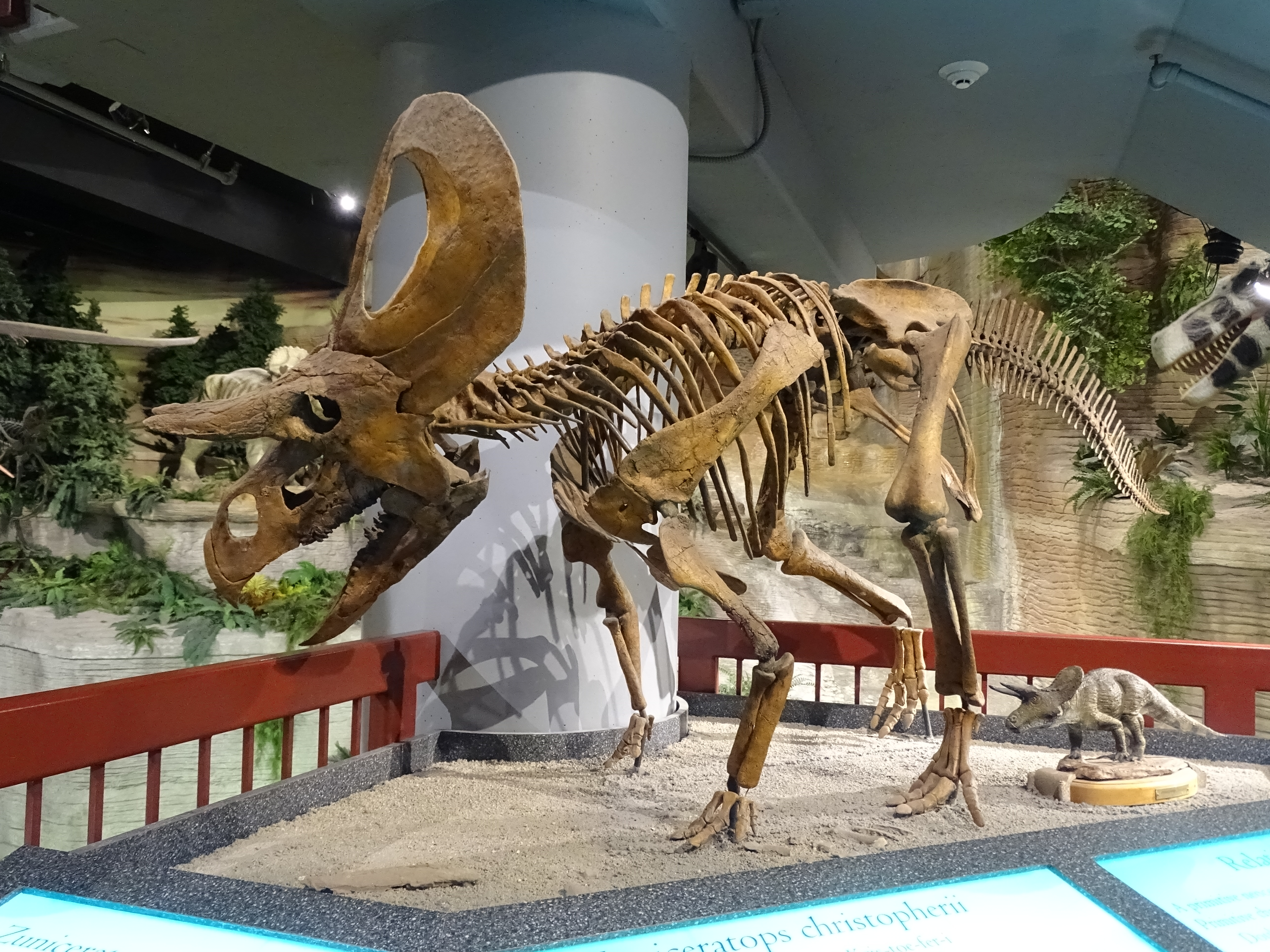
- Reconstructed skeleton

Scientific classification
- Kingdom: Animalia
- Phylum: Chordata
- Class: Reptilia
- Clade: Dinosauria
- Clade: †Ornithischia
- Clade: †Ceratopsia
- Clade: †Coronosauria
- Superfamily: †Ceratopsoidea
- Genus: †Zuniceratops; Wolfe & Kirkland, 1998
- Species: †Z. christopheri

Binomial name
- †Zuniceratops christopheri Wolfe & Kirkland, 1998

= Zuniceratops =

Zuniceratops Temporal range: Late Cretaceous (Turonian – Coniacian) 90.9–88.6 Ma

Extinct genus of ceratopsian

Zuniceratops ('Zuni horned face') is a genus of ceratopsian dinosaurs that lived during the Turonian stage of the Late Cretaceous in what is now New Mexico, United States. It contains a single species, Zuniceratops christopheri.

== History of discovery ==
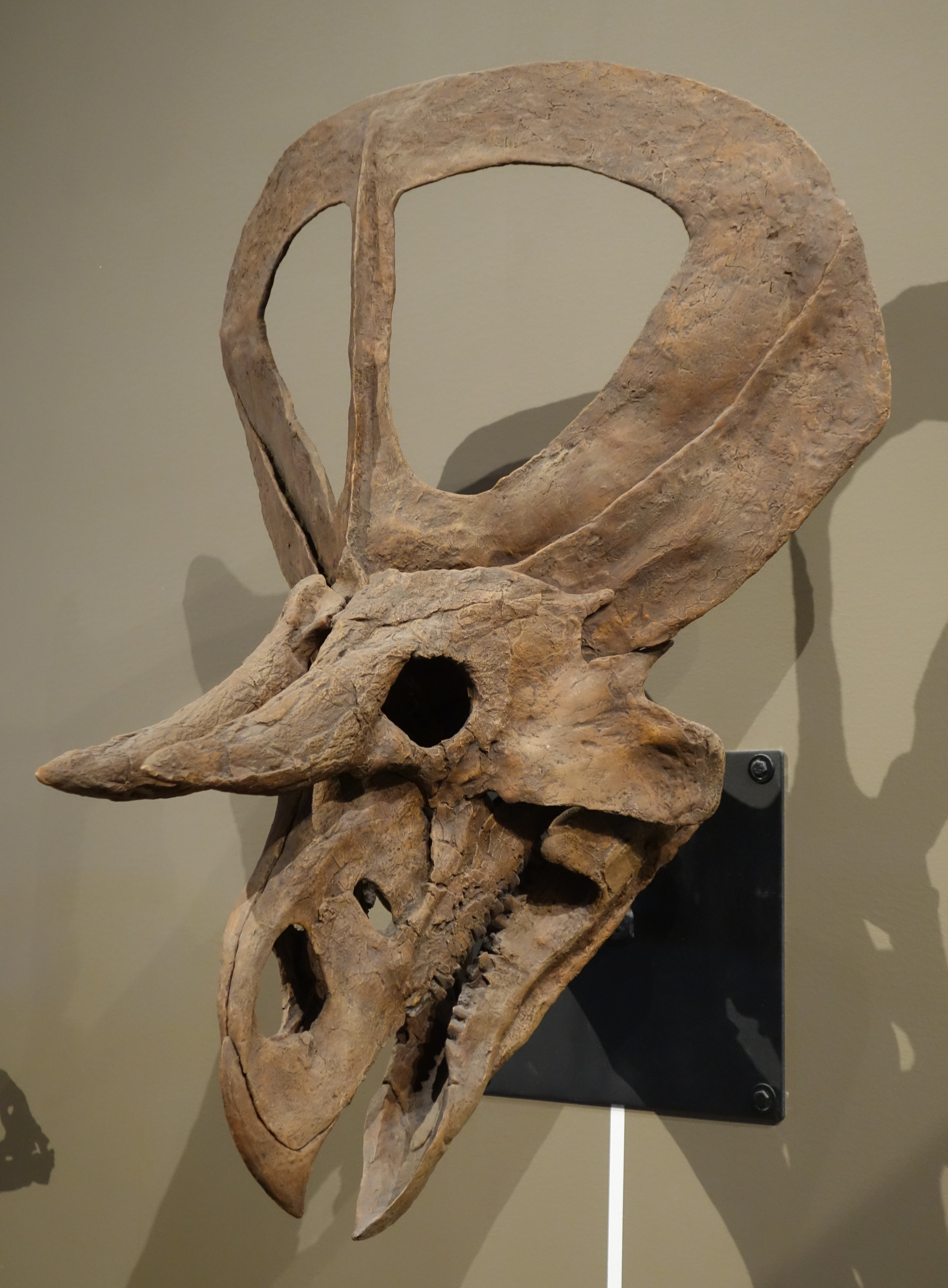
Reconstructed skull

Zuniceratops was discovered in 1996 by eight-year-old Christopher James Wolfe, son of paleontologist Douglas G. Wolfe, in the Moreno Hill Formation in west-central New Mexico. There, one skull and the bones from several individuals have been found. This discovery of Zuniceratops bonebed has been suggested as one of the evidence for the claim that grouping behavior could be a synapomorphic trait for ceratopsians. In 2001, a bone believed to be a squamosal was found to be an ischium of a Nothronychus.

The holotype specimen, MSM P2101, is either a juvenile or a subadult, while other specimens like MSM P2102 and MSM P3812 belong to adults. The skull is long and low with no nasal horn, but bears a well-developed pair of brow horns that are similar to those of chasmosaurs and primitive centrosaurs, showing that brow horns are plesiomorphic traits.

== Description ==
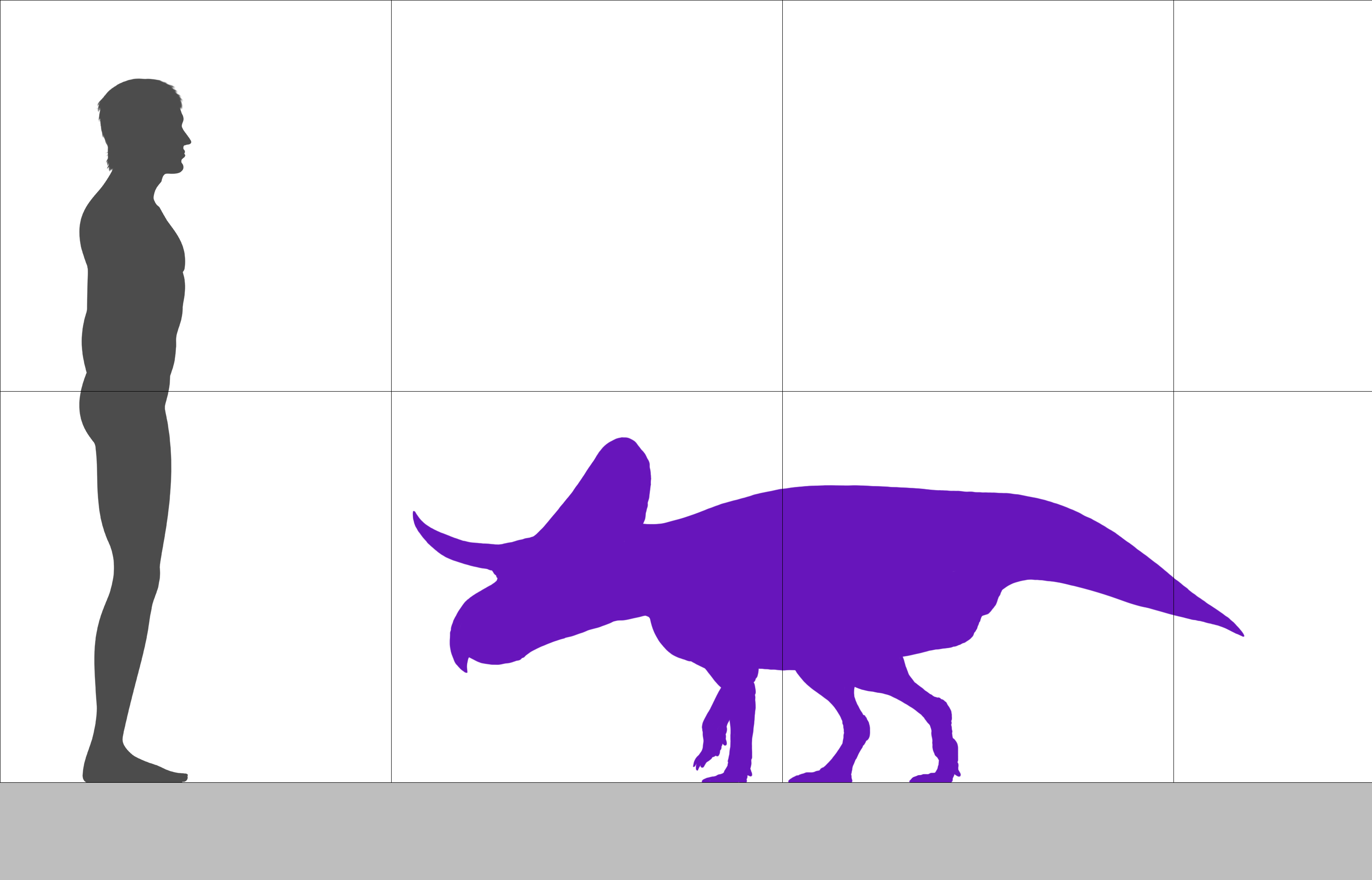
Size comparison with human

Zuniceratops was a relatively small ceratopsian, measuring about 2.2–3.5 meters (7.2–11.5 ft) long, 1 meter tall (3.3 feet) at the hips and weighing around 175 kilograms (386 lb). The basal skull length is estimated up to 40 centimetres (1.3 ft). The partial proximal parietal is shown to have an inverted "T" shape, as in Protoceratops. Although the first specimen discovered had single-rooted teeth (unusual for ceratopsians), larger fossils had double-rooted teeth, showing that the teeth became double-rooted with age and that it is a plesiomorphic trait.

== Classification ==
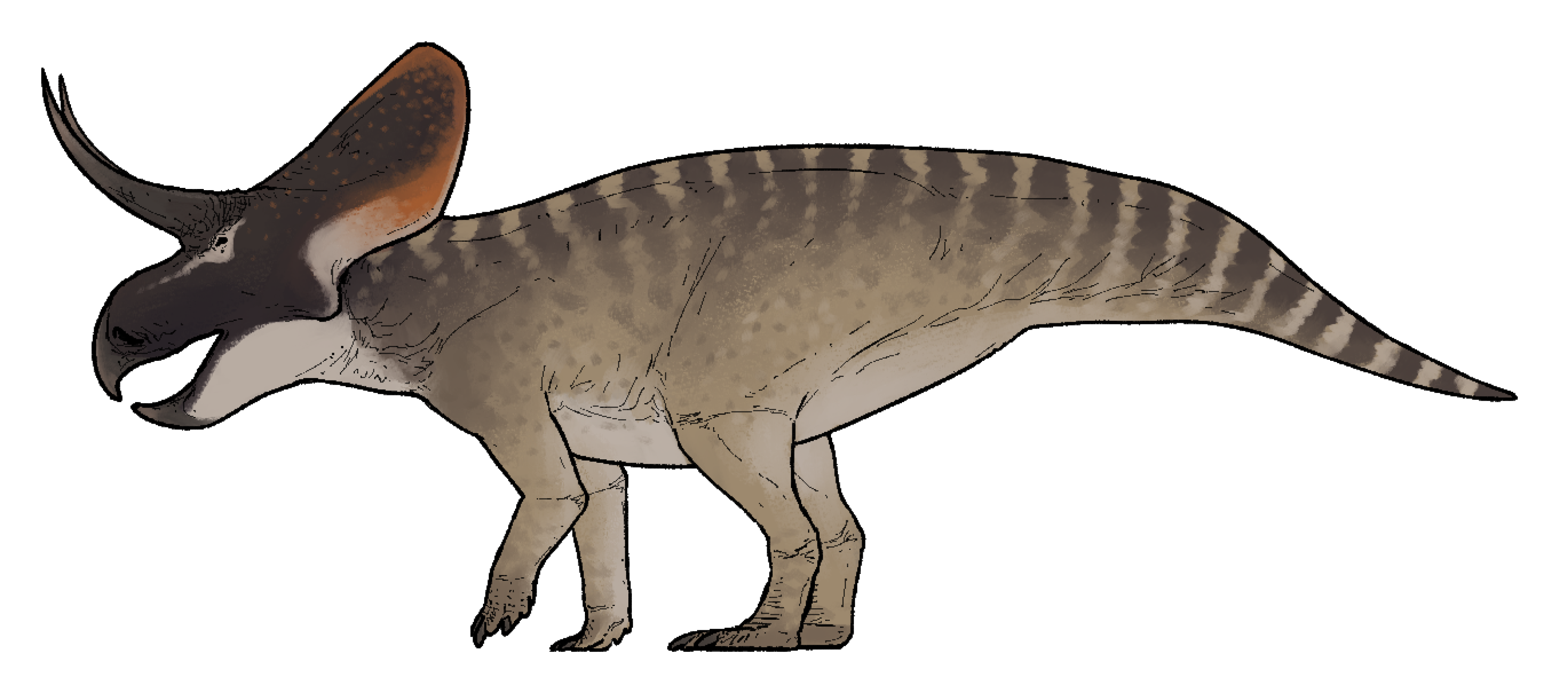
Life restoration

Zuniceratops is an example of the evolutionary transition between early ceratopsians and the later, larger ceratopsids that had very large horns and frills, supporting the theory that the lineage of ceratopsian dinosaurs may have been North American in origin. Re-examinations of Turanoceratops and Zuniceratops, which are known as two critical ceratopsian taxa regarding the evolutionary history of ceratopsids, showed that the origin of ceratopsids is unrelated to, and older than the fossil record of Protoceratops and relatives.

Phylogenetic analysis reveal that Zuniceratops is a non-ceratopsid neoceratopisan, closely related to Turanoceratops:

- Coronosauria
  - - Graciliceratops
    - - Protoceratopsidae
        - Bagaceratops
        - Protoceratops
      - - Zuniceratops
        - - Turanoceratops
          - - Ceratopsidae
  - - Leptoceratopsidae

== Paleoenvironment ==
Specimens of Zuniceratops are known from the Moreno Hill Formation, which documents a time of tectonic upheaval, volcanic activities, humid paleoclimate, and North American coastal margin shifts. Other dinosaurs fossils recovered from this formation are Suskityrannus, Nothronychus, Jeyawati, and undescribed ankylosaur remains. Three groups of turtle fossils have been reported: a baenid Edowa, a helochelydrid Naomichelys and an indeterminate trionychid. Other vertebrate fossils include crocodyliform teeth, amiid teeth and gar scales.

== See also ==
- Timeline of ceratopsian research
