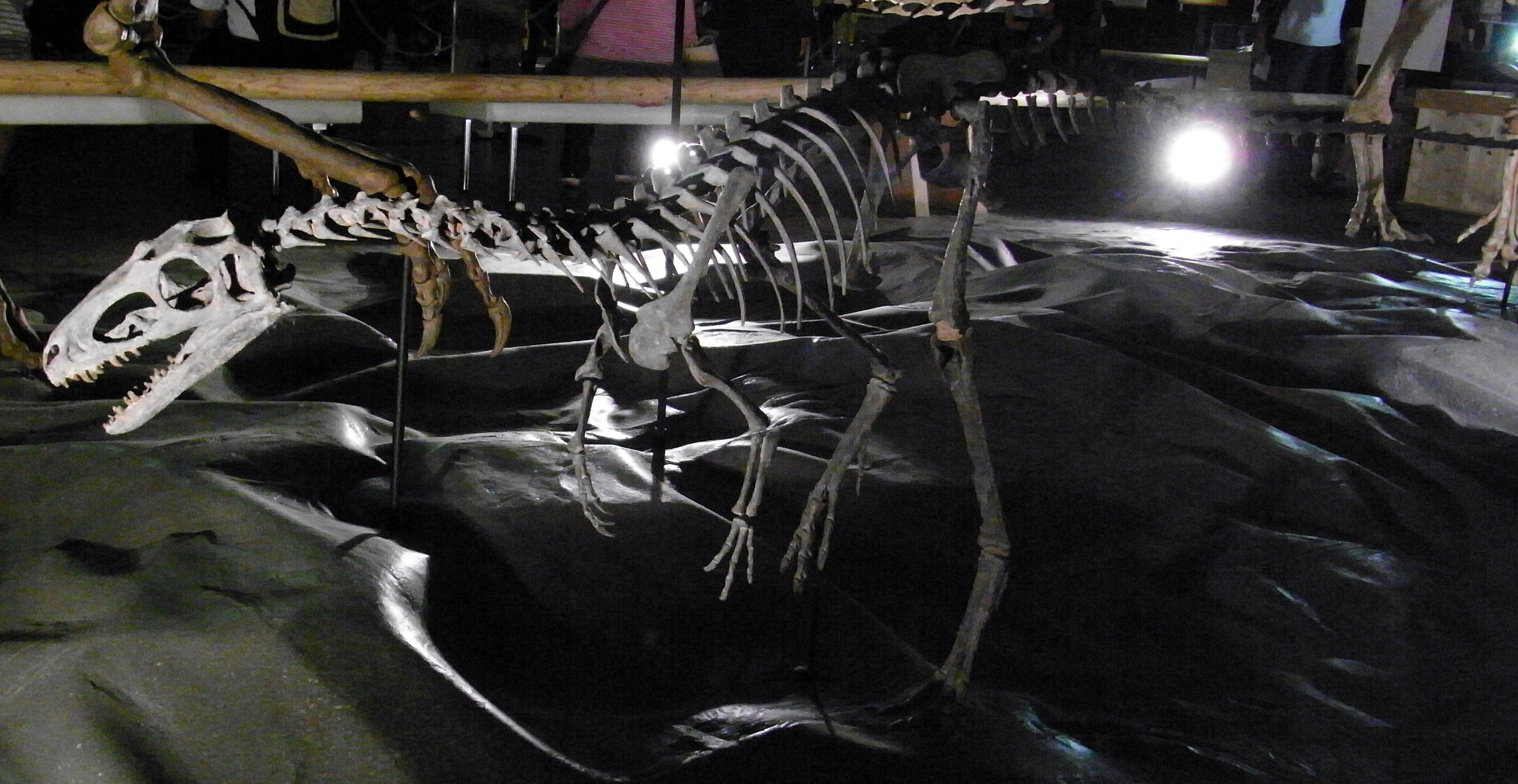
- Reconstructed skeleton at the Dinokingdom exhibition, Chiba

Scientific classification
- Kingdom: Animalia
- Phylum: Chordata
- Class: Reptilia
- Clade: Dinosauria
- Clade: Saurischia
- Clade: Theropoda
- Clade: Tyrannoraptora
- Superfamily: †Tyrannosauroidea
- Clade: †Pantyrannosauria
- Genus: †Suskityrannus; Nesbitt et al., 2019
- Species: †S. hazelae

Binomial name
- †Suskityrannus hazelae Nesbitt et al., 2019

= Suskityrannus =

Suskityrannus Temporal range: Late Cretaceous (Turonian) 93.9–89.8 Ma

Extinct genus of tyrannosaur dinosaurs

Suskityrannus (meaning "coyote tyrant", suski meaning "coyote" in Zuni) is a genus of small tyrannosauroid theropod from the Late Cretaceous of southern Laramidia. It contains a single species, Suskityrannus hazelae, and the type specimen was found in the Turonian-aged Moreno Hill Formation of the Zuni Basin in western New Mexico.

== Discovery and naming ==
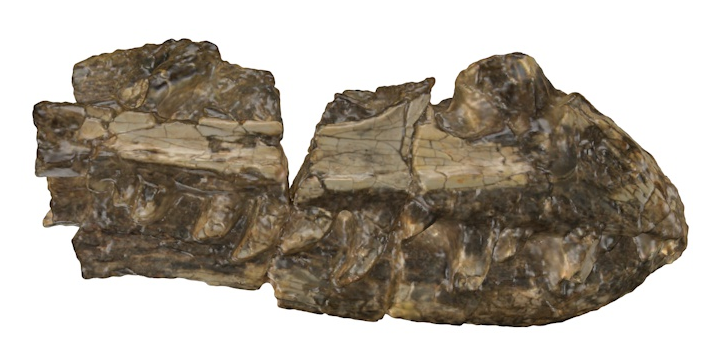
3D model of the holotype snout

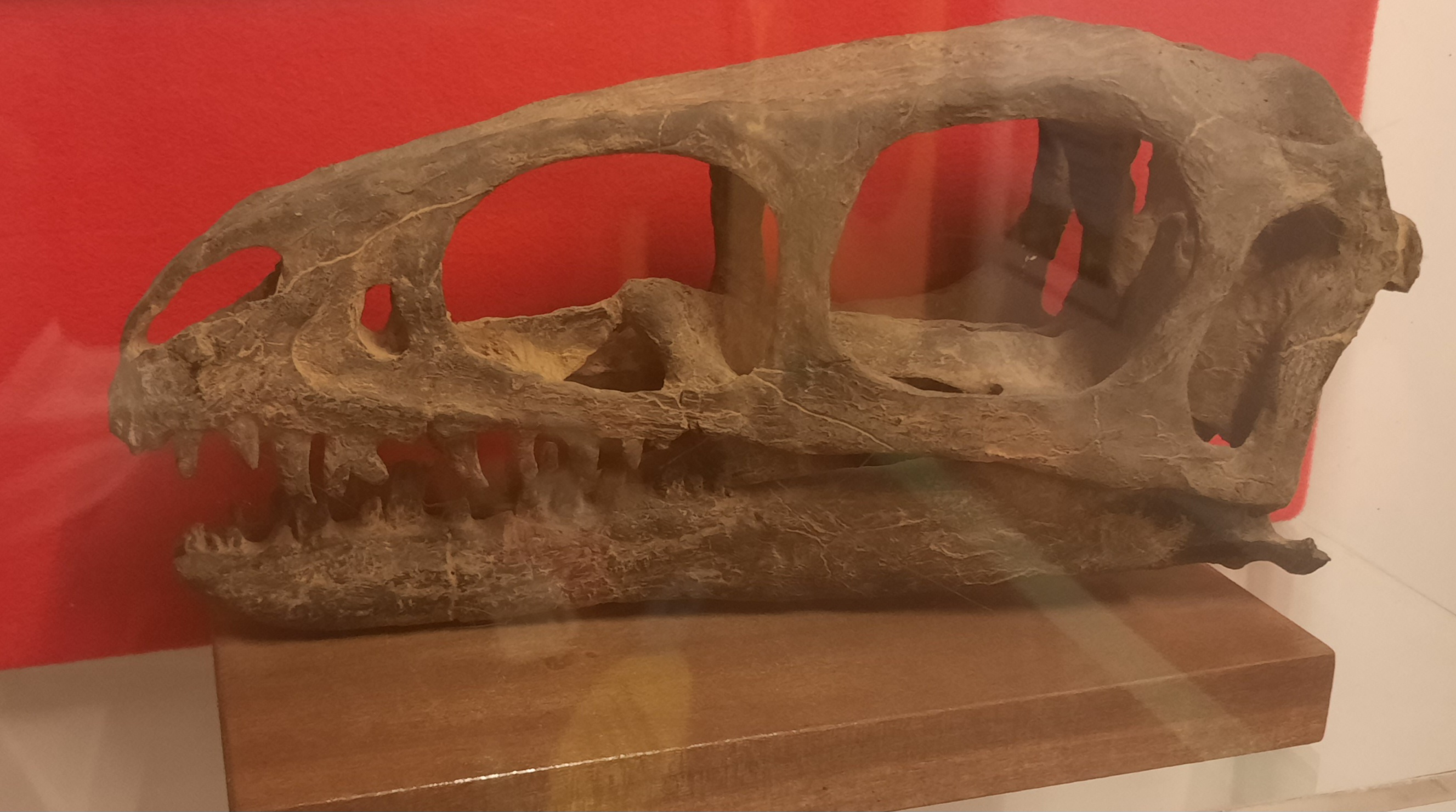
Reconstructed skull of S. hazelae at the Dinosaur Museum, Dorchester

First mentioned as a small dromaeosaurid by Wolfe and Kirkland in their description of Zuniceratops, Suskityrannus was informally referred to as the "Zuni coelurosaur", "Zuni tyrannosaur", and by the 2011 documentary Planet Dinosaur "Zunityrannus" prior to its scientific description.

The original fossils were found in 1998 by Robert Denton, a professional geologist from Virginia, and a native Mesa teen Sterling Nesbitt, who was a museum volunteer that came to a dig with paleontologist Doug Wolfe.

In 2019 Suskityrannus was formally described as a genus of primitive tyrannosauroid. Both the holotype specimen MSM P4754 (partially articulated skull and a few postcranial bones) and the paratype specimen MSM P6178 (partially articulated and associated remains including a few skull bones and an incomplete postcranial skeleton) are preserved in the collections of the Arizona Museum of Natural History, and they both show the phylogenetically earliest known arctometatarsalian foot in tyrannosauroids.

== Description ==
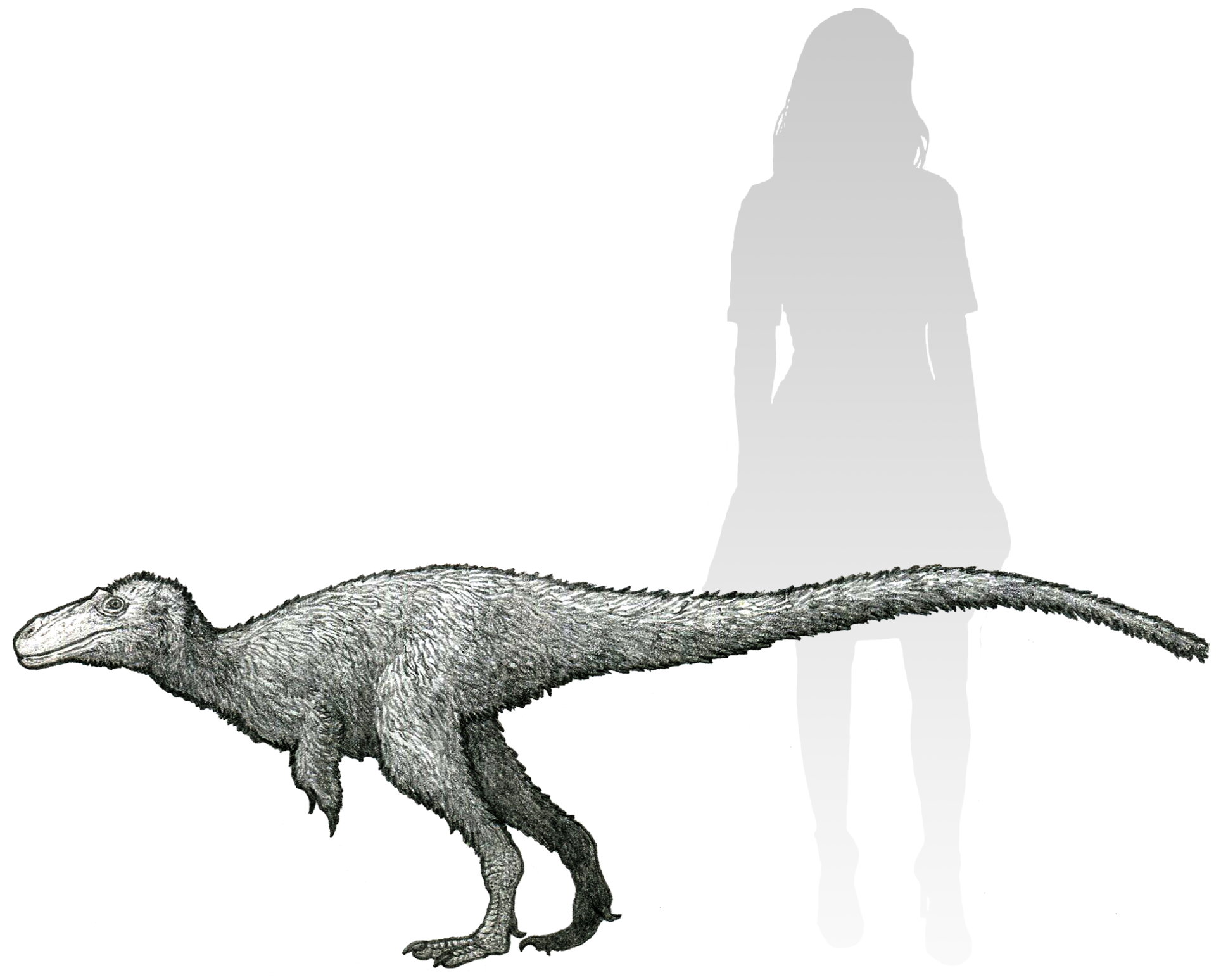
Restoration and size comparison

Suskityrannus is a small tyrannosaur, with the skull of known specimens measuring 25–32 cm (9.8–12.6 in) long, which grew similarly to earlier tyrannosauroids like Guanlong. The holotype and the paratype belong to young individuals that didn't reach skeletal maturity, but the histological analyses revealed that the bone tissues and vascularization are different from those found in young individuals of large-bodied tyrannosaurids during the Campanian-Maastrichtian age, so the adults would have been significantly smaller than mature tyrannosaurids.

== Classification ==
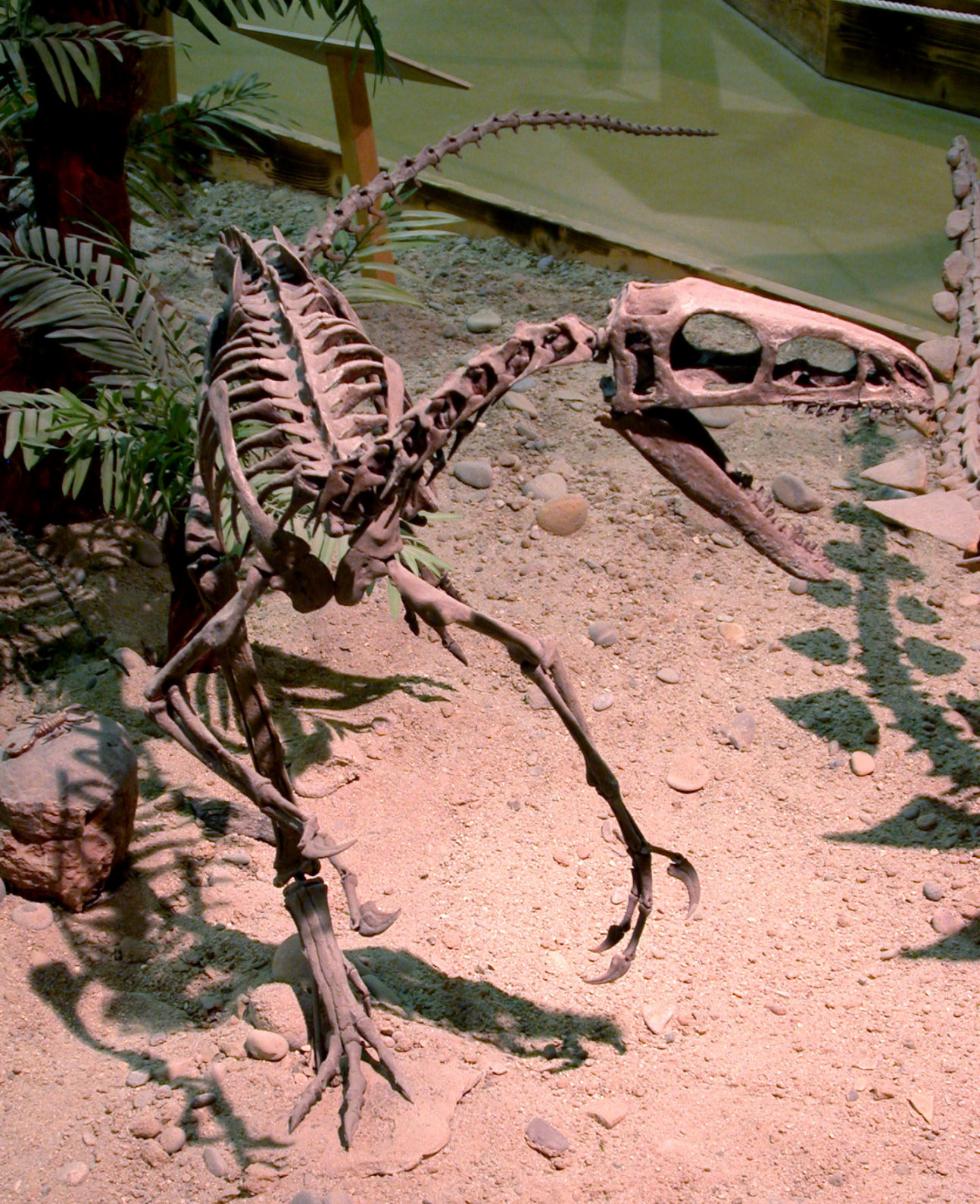
Earlier reconstruction of the skeleton with more generic coelurosaurian features, Wyoming Dinosaur Center

Suskityrannus filled the major phylogenetic, morphological and temporal gaps that researchers needed to piece together tyrannosauroid evolution. Below is the phylogenetic analysis on the placement of Suskityrannus.

- - Tyrannosauroidea
    - Proceratosauridae
    - - - Stokesosaurus
        - Juratyrant
        - Eotyrannus
      - - Suskityrannus
        - - Timurlengia
          - - Xiongguanlong
            - - Dryptosaurus
              - - Appalachiosaurus
                - - Bistahieversor
                  - Tyrannosauridae

== Paleoenvironment ==
Specimens of Suskityrannus are known from the Moreno Hill Formation which documents a time of tectonic upheaval, volcanic activities, humid paleoclimate, and North American coastal margin shifts. Other dinosaurs fossils recovered from this formation are Zuniceratops, Nothronychus, Jeyawati, and undescribed ankylosaur remains. Three groups of turtle fossils have been reported: a baenid Edowa, a helochelydrid Naomichelys and an indeterminate trionychid. Other vertebrate fossils include crocodyliform teeth, amiid teeth and gar scales.
