= Tres Hermanos Formation =

Clastic wedge in New Mexico

- Stratigraphic range: Turonian
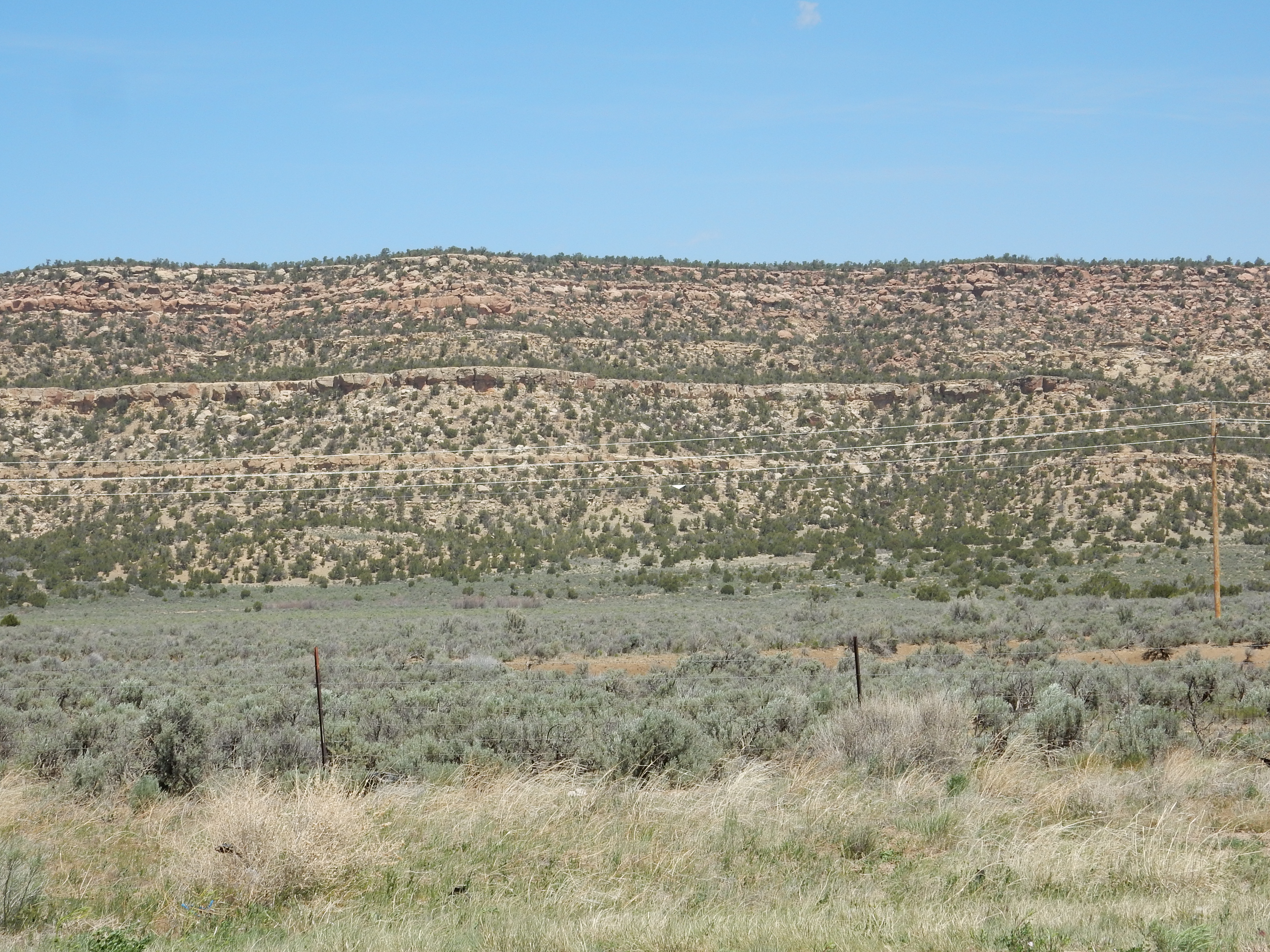
- Tres Hermanos Formation in lower slopes of mesa between Zuni Pueblo and Ramah, New Mexico, US
- Type: Geological formation
- Underlies: Pescado or D-Cross Tongue, Mancos Shale
- Overlies: Rio Salado Tongue, Mancos Shale
- Thickness: 200–300 feet (61–91 m)

Lithology
- Primary: Sandstone

Location
- Coordinates: 33.886°N 106.756°W
- Country: United States

Type section
- Named for: Tres Hermanos Buttes
- Named by: C.L. Herrick
- Year defined: 1900
- Tres Hermanos Formation (the United States) Tres Hermanos Formation (New Mexico)

The Tres Hermanos Formation is a geologic formation in central and west-central New Mexico. It contains fossils characteristic of the Turonian Age of the late Cretaceous.

== Description ==
The formation is a clastic wedge directed to the northeast into the Mancos Shale. This divides the Mancos Shale into the underlying Rio Salado Tongue and the overlying Pescado or D-Cross Tongue. The base of the wedge is approximately along a line from the Arizona-New Mexico border southwest of Gallup, New Mexico to east of Cookes Range, where the overlying Pescado or D-Cross Tongue of the Mancos Shale pinches out. The wedge itself pinches out along an arc that passes south of Gallup and just north of Acoma Pueblo and west of Capitan. Total thickness is 200–300 feet (61–91 m).

The formation itself is interpreted as a regression-transgression sequence of the Western Interior Seaway. It is divided into three members: the lower Atarque Sandstone Member, which is regressive marine sandstone; the Carthage Member, a sequence of marine and nonmarine shale and sandstone; and the upper Fite Ranch Member, a transgressive marine sandstone.

== Fossils ==
The base of the formation contains the ammonite Spathites coahuilaensis characteristic of the middle Turonian. The formation spans the ammonite zones of Collignoniceras woollgari, Prionocyclus percarinatus, P. hyatti, and P. macombit, indicating that the formation ranges from early middle Turonian to early late Turonian.

Dinosaur remains are among the fossils that have been recovered from the formation, although none have yet been referred to a specific genus.

== History of investigation ==
The unit was first designated the Tres Hermanos Sandstone member of the Mancos Shale by C.L. Herrick in 1900. In 1983, Hook et al. raised the unit to formation rank and interpreted it as a clastic wedge directed to the northeast into the Mancos Shale. They also divided the formation into the Atarque Sandstone Member, the Carthage Member, and the Fite Ranch Member.

== See also ==
- List of dinosaur-bearing rock formations
  - List of stratigraphic units with indeterminate dinosaur fossils
