= Canutillo Formation =

Geologic formation in Texas, US

- Stratigraphic range: Middle Devonian
- Type: Formation
- Underlies: Percha Formation
- Overlies: Fusselman Formation
- Thickness: 15 feet (4.6 m)

Lithology
- Primary: Siltstone
- Other: Shale

Location
- Coordinates: 31.92°N 106.50°W
- Region: Texas
- Country: United States

Type section
- Named for: Canutillo, Texas
- Named by: L.A. Nelson
- Year defined: 1940
- Canutillo Formation (the United States) Canutillo Formation (Texas)

The Canutillo Formation is a geologic formation that is exposed in the Franklin Mountains near El Paso, Texas. The formation is Middle Devonian in age.

== Description ==
The Canutillo Formation consists of about 15 feet (4.6 m) of soft gray siltstone. It is unconformably overlain by the Percha Formation. The Canutillo Formation likely correlates with the Onate Formation.

== Fossils ==
The formation is fossiliferous, but few fossils are time diagnostic. Fossils include abundant Leiorhynchus and other brachiopods and a few pelecypods.

== History of investigation ==
The formation was first described in his dissertation by L.A. Nelson in 1937 for outcrops in the Franklin Mountains. Nelson assigned all beds between the Silurian Fusselman Formation and the Mississippian Helms Formation to the Canutillo. Nelson formally published the definition in 1940 and extended the outcrop range to the Hueco Mountains. In 1945, F.V. Stevenson restricted the formation to the Franklin Mountains. In 1949, Lowell R. Laudon and Arthur L. Bowshwer restricted the formation to a sequence of just 15 feet (4.6 m) of soft gray siltstone.

== See also ==
- List of fossiliferous stratigraphic units in Texas
- Paleontology in Texas
