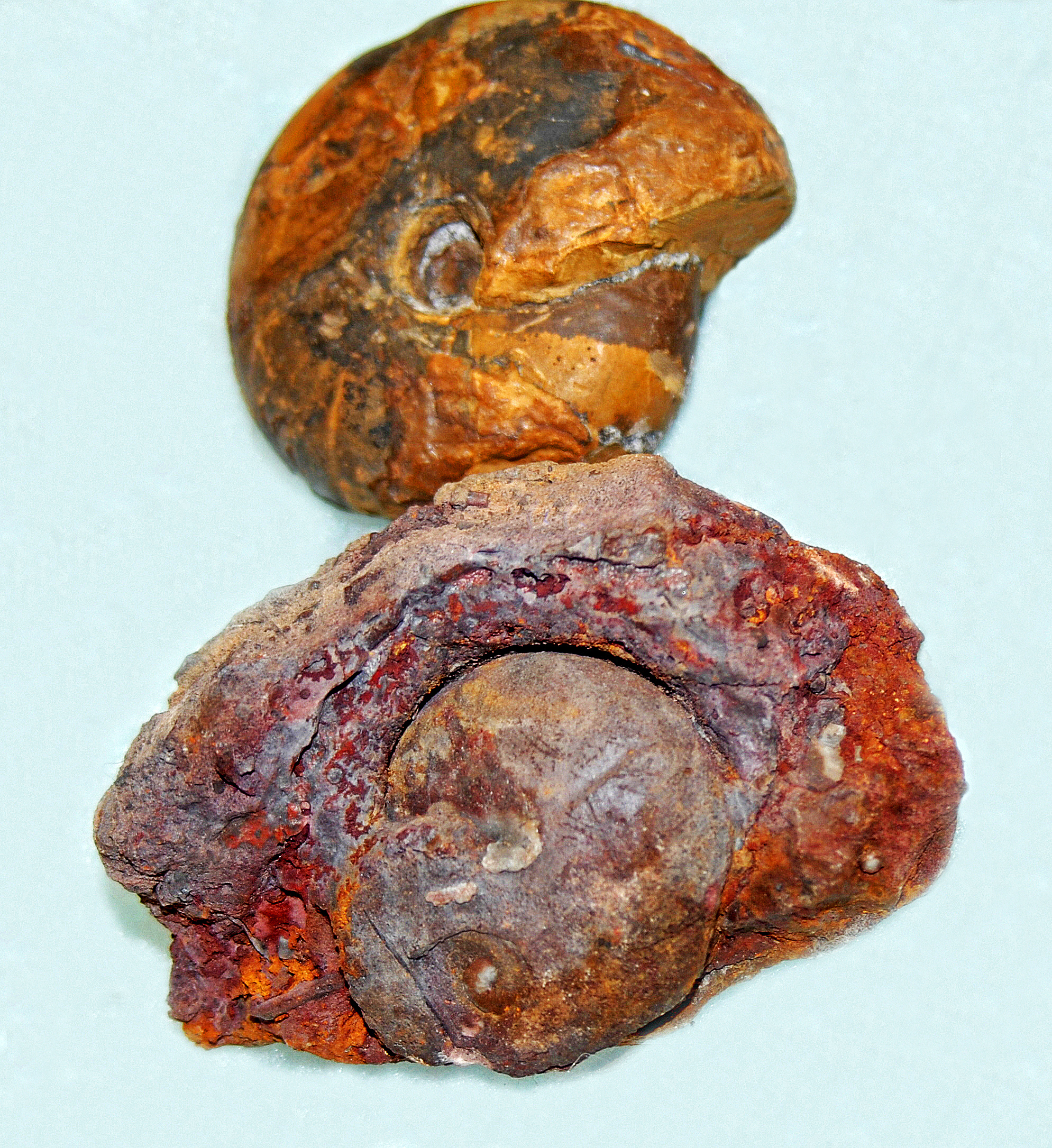
- Fossil shells of Beyrichoceras from Visean of Madagascar (Erfoud)

Scientific classification
- Domain: Eukaryota
- Kingdom: Animalia
- Phylum: Mollusca
- Class: Cephalopoda
- Subclass: †Ammonoidea
- Order: †Goniatitida
- Family: †Maxigoniatitidae
- Genus: †Beyrichoceras; Foord, 1903

= Beyrichoceras =

Beyrichoceras Temporal range: L Carboniferous – M Mississippian 345.3–336 Ma

Genus of molluscs (fossil)

Beyrichoceras is a genus belonging to the goniatitid family Maxigoniatitidae that lived during the Mississippian Period (Early Carboniferous)

== Description ==
Beyrichoceras can be recognized by its small, thickly discoidal shell with small umbilicus, deep dorsal impression, arched flanks and rounded venter The ventral lobe of the suture is bifurcated, wide at its base, narrowing apically, ending in a pair of outwardly turned prongs separated by a low median saddle. The first lateral lobe is similar in size to the ventral lobe; broad, V-shaped, and more or less symmetrical. The umbilical lobe, like the first lateral lobe, is broad, V-shaped, and fairly symmetrical, only much shallower. The dorsal lobe is long and narrow, closely flanked by narrow internal lobes.

== Taxonomic position ==
Beyrichoceras is assigned to the Maximitidae, although some authors have assigned it to the Muensteroceratidae or Anthracoceratidae. Miller and Furnish included Beyrichoceras in the subfamily Goniatitinae, family Goniatitidae, and superfamily Goniatitaceae. The Maxigoniatitidae, established by Korn, Klug & Mapes, 1999, is based on Goniatites maximus var. saourensis Pareyn, 1961, renamed Maxigoniatites

== Distribution and range ==
Beyrichoceras is found in middle Lower Carboniferous ( Mississippian upper Osagean-Meremacian equivalent) strata in North America, Europe, and North Africa.

== Paleoecology ==
Beyrichoceras has been described as a "fast-moving nektonic carnivore". Its small, involutely coiled form nevertheless suggest a floating nektonic or nekto-benthic stalker capable to sudden swift maneuvering. As with all known cephalopods, Beyrichoceras was undoubtedly carnivorous.
