= Contadero Formation =

Geologic formation in New Mexico, US

- Stratigraphic range: Frasnian
- Type: Formation
- Sub-units: Salinas Peak Member, Thurgood Member, Rhodes Canyon Member.[2]
- Underlies: Lake Valley Formation
- Overlies: Sly Gap Formation

Lithology
- Primary: Limestone, shale
- Other: Siltstone

Location
- Coordinates: 33.192743°N 106.630494°W
- Region: New Mexico
- Country: United States

Type section
- Named by: F.V. Stevenson
- Year defined: 1945
- Contadero Formation (the United States) Contadero Formation (New Mexico)

The Contadero Formation is a geologic formation in the San Andres Mountains of New Mexico. It preserves fossils dating back to the late Devonian period.

== Description ==
The formation consists of limestone, shale, and siltstone. The total thickness is 66.5 feet (20.3 m) at the type section. It overlies the Sly Gap Formation and underlies the Lake Valley Limestone.

The formation is divided into three members (in ascending stratigraphic order): the Salinas Peak Member, the Thurgood Member, and the Rhodes Canyon Member.

The formation is thought to correlate with the lower Percha Shale.

== Fossils ==
The formation contains brachiopods and horn corals, with 20 genera and 24 species of brachiopods identified. These are characteristic of the late Frasnian.

== History of investigation ==
The formation was first defined by Frank V. Stevenson in 1945 for exposures at Rhodes Canyon in the San Andres Mountains. While revising New Mexico Devonian stratigraphy in 1984, Souraf assigned all Devonian beds above the Sly Gap Formation to the Conadero Formation, including beds previously assigned to the Thoroughgood and Rhodes Canyon Formations, which were reduced to member rank within the Conadero Formation. Souraf also designed a new Salinas Peak Member and changed the spelling of Thoroughgood to Thurgood.

== See also ==
- List of fossiliferous stratigraphic units in New Mexico
- Paleontology in New Mexico
