= Quasintoceras =

Quasintoceras Temporal range: Early Carboniferous

Scientific classification
- Domain: Eukaryota
- Kingdom: Animalia
- Phylum: Mollusca
- Class: Cephalopoda
- Subclass: †Ammonoidea
- Order: †Goniatitida
- Family: †Intoceratidae
- Genus: †Quasintoceras; Kusina, 1974

Genus of molluscs (fossil)

Quasintoceras is a genus of goniatitid ammonites from the Lower Carboniferous Visean included in the Intoceratidae of the Pericyclaceae, now Pericycloidea.

Aquilonites, Intoceras, and Oxintoceras are among related genera.
