= Ammonellipsites =

Scientific classification
- Domain: Eukaryota
- Kingdom: Animalia
- Phylum: Mollusca
- Class: Cephalopoda
- Subclass: †Ammonoidea
- Order: †Goniatitida
- Family: †Pericyclidae
- Subfamily: †Ammonellipsitinae
- Genus: †Ammonellipsites; Parkinson 1822

Genus of molluscs (fossil)

Ammonellipsites is a genus belonging to the Ammonellipsitinae subfamily. They are an extinct group of ammonoids, which are shelled cephalopods related to squids, belemnites, octopuses, and cuttlefish, and more distantly to the nautiloids.
