= Ammonellipsitinae =

Scientific classification
- Domain: Eukaryota
- Kingdom: Animalia
- Phylum: Mollusca
- Class: Cephalopoda
- Subclass: †Ammonoidea
- Order: †Goniatitida
- Family: †Pericyclidae
- Subfamily: †Ammonellipsitinae; Riley 1996

Genera
- Ammonellipsites; Fascipericyclus; Helicocyclus; Stenocyclus

Extinct subfamily of molluscs

The Ammonellipsitinae is a subfamily (one of two) within the Pericyclidae, a family within the goniatitid superfamily Pericycloidea from the Lower Carboniferous (Mississippian) characterized by having a suture in which the sides of the ventral lobe diverge and the first lateral saddle is acute or subacute, and in which the immature and juvenile shell has a wide umbilicus.

Of the four genera so far included, Fascipericyclus, Helicocyclus, and Stenocyclus were once considered subgenera of Pericyclus. The type genus, Ammonellisites was also included in the older Pericylitinae that was part of the Goniatitidae in Miller et al. (1960)

Ammonellipsitinae have been found mostly in Europe but some have been found in North America (US) as well
