= Beyrichoceratoides =

Beyrichoceratoides Temporal range: L Carboniferous (Mississippian)

Scientific classification
- Kingdom: Animalia
- Phylum: Mollusca
- Class: Cephalopoda
- Subclass: †Ammonoidea
- Order: †Goniatitida
- Family: †Muensteroceratidae
- Genus: †Beyrichoceratoides; Bisat, 1924

Genus of molluscs (fossil)

Beyrichoceras is a genus belonging to the goniatitid family Muensteroceratidae, a group of ammonoids, extinct shelled cephalopods related to belemnites and recent coleoids and more distantly to the nautiloids

== Description ==
Beyrichoceratoides has a smooth involute discoidal shell with a very narrow umbilicus, non-crenulate biconvex growth lines, and well-developed ventro-lateral salients and deep hyponomic sinus. The ventral lobe of the suture is moderately narrow and straight sided; bifurcated with short prongs separated by a low median saddle. The first lateral and umbilical lobes are like those of Beyrichoceras, broad and V-shaped, only the first lateral one is more symmetrical in Beyrichoceratoides. The internal dorsal and flanking lobes are also like those of Beyrichoceras but with the flanking lobes set relatively further apart.

== Derivation and taxonomy ==
Beyrichoceratoides was derived from Muensteroceras near the beginning of the Carboniferous (early Mississippian) and is included in the Muesteroceratidae, a family assigned to the Goniatitid superfamily Pericyclaceae.

Beyrichoceratoides was named by Bisat in 1924, based on Goniatites implicatus Phillips, 1836. Schindewolf, 1951, considered Beyrichoceratoides equivalent to Münsteroceras Hyatt 1884 as also presented in the Treatise Part L, 1957. Ruzhentsev, 1960, considered Beyrichoceratoide a distinct genus as do Korn 2006 and Nikolaeva 2008.

== Distribution and range ==
Beyrichoceratoides has been found in the Lower Carboniferous (Mississippian). of Great Britain

== Paleoecology ==
Beyrichoceratoides has been described as a "fast-moving nektonic carnivore". However, its somewhat globular discoidal form suggest a small stalking or hovering nektonic or nekto-benthic ambush predator capable of sudden swift movements to either grab prey or escape predation. As with all known cephalopods, Beyrichoceratoides was undoubtedly carnivorous.
