= Caballero Formation =

Geologic formation in New Mexico, US

- Stratigraphic range: Tournaisian
- Type: Formation
- Underlies: Lake Valley Limestone
- Overlies: Percha Shale

Lithology
- Primary: Limestone
- Other: Shale

Location
- Coordinates: 32.8545°N 105.9043°W
- Region: New Mexico
- Country: United States

Type section
- Named by: L.R. Laudon and A.L. Bowsher
- Year defined: 1941
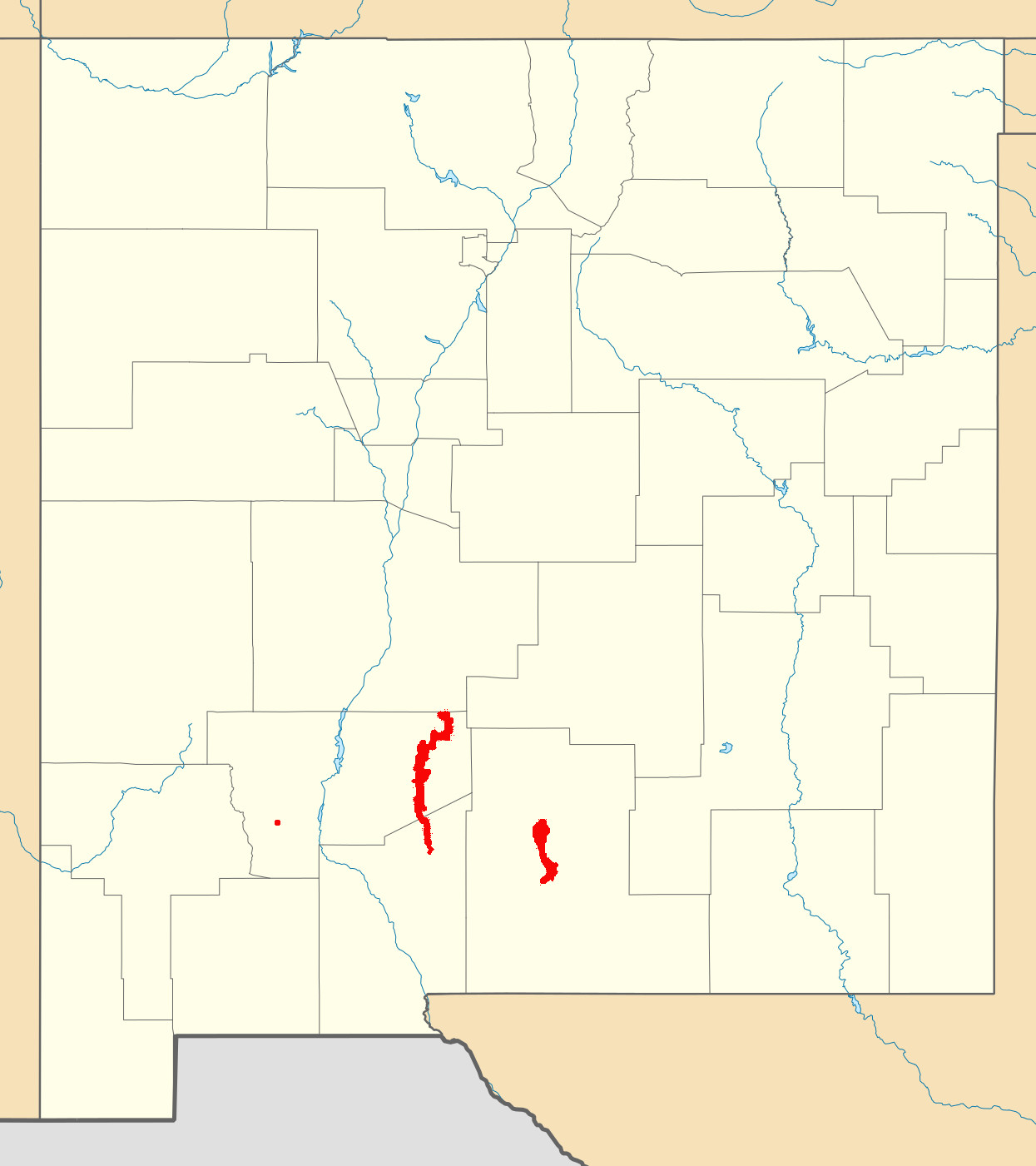
- Caballero Formation (New Mexico)

The Caballero Formation is a geologic formation found in the highlands flanking the southern Rio Grande River valley in New Mexico. It preserves fossils dating back to the Tournasian Age of the Carboniferous period.

== Description ==
The Caballero Formation consists of nodular gray argillaceous limestone, which grades upward into nodular gray marl with shale lenses. It rests conformably on the Percha Shale and is overlain unconformably by the Lake Valley Limestone. The formation likely correlates with the Chouteau Limestone of the upper Mississippi valley.

== Fossils ==
The formation is locally abundant in fossils of Tournasian age, with more than 200 marine invertebrate species reported. These include the ammonoids Pericyclus blairi, P. Cooperi P. costulatus, and Gattendorfia bransoni as well as Tournasian conodont and brachiopod faunas. The fauna changes significantly from the westernmost to easternmost exposures of the formation.

== History of investigation ==
The beds forming this unit were originally included in the Devonian Percha Shale, but were separated into their own formation by Laudon and Bowsher in 1941, when it was recognized that they are Mississippian in age.

== See also ==
- List of fossiliferous stratigraphic units in New Mexico
- Paleontology in New Mexico
