= Coronado Sandstone =

Geologic formation in Arizona and New Mexico, US

- Stratigraphic range: Middle Cambrian to Late Cambrian
- Type: Formation
- Underlies: El Paso Formation
- Overlies: Precambrian basement
- Thickness: 536 feet (163 m)

Lithology
- Primary: Sandstone

Location
- Coordinates: 33.130°N 109.402°W
- Region: Arizona, New Mexico
- Country: United States

Type section
- Named for: Coronado Mountain
- Named by: W. Lindgren
- Year defined: 1905
- Coronado Sandstone (the United States) Coronado Sandstone (Arizona)

The Coronado Sandstone is a geologic formation that is exposed in eastern Arizona and western New Mexico. It is Cambrian in age based on its position in the stratigraphic column.

== Description ==
The formation consists of dark-weathering sandstone, whose grains are usually cemented by quartz but in some locations by carbonate minerals. The lower beds are arkosic (rich in feldspar) but the upper beds are more nearly pure quartz. Its thickness varies from about 200–600 feet (61–183 m). The formation also contains scattered siltstone, silty shale, and dolomite beds. It is overlain by the El Paso Formation and rests on Precambrian basement rock. It is laterally equivalent to the lower part of the Abrigo Formation. To the east, it onlaps onto the underlying basement and its upper beds grade into the Bliss Formation.

The formation contains no age-diagnostic fossils but is thought to be Middle Cambrian to Late Cambrian based on its relations to other rock strata. A single zircon grain from the formation has been dated at 503 million years old, establishing this is the maximum age of the formation. The formation was likely deposited during a marine transgression (advance of the sea across the continent).

The formation is low in porosity, giving it poor potential as a petroleum reservoir.

== History of investigation ==
The formation was first as the Coronado Quartzite named by Waldemar Lindgren in 1905 for outcrops near Coronado Mountain in southeastern Arizona. P.T. Hayes renamed the unit as the Coronado Sandstone in 1972.
