= Sly Gap Formation =

Geologic formation in New Mexico, US

- Stratigraphic range: Frasnian
- Type: Formation
- Underlies: Percha Formation, Contadero Formation
- Overlies: Onate Formation
- Thickness: 114 feet (35 m)

Lithology
- Primary: limestone
- Other: siltstone, shale

Location
- Coordinates: 33.3322°N 106.4574°W
- Region: New Mexico
- Country: United States

Type section
- Named by: F.V. Stevenson
- Year defined: 1945
- Sly Gap Formation (the United States) Sly Gap Formation (New Mexico)

The Sly Gap Formation is a geologic formation in south-central New Mexico. It preserves fossils dating back to the Frasnian Age of the late Devonian period.

== Description ==
The formation consists of about 114 feet (35 m) of brown, yellow, or gray limestone and siltstone and brown to greenish-gray shale. It disconformably overlies the Onate Formation and is overlain by the Percha Formation or the Contadero Formation. It pinches out in the west in the Basin and Range province.

== Fossils ==
The formation includes crinoidal siltstone beds and many other beds are fossiliferous, bearing crinoid, brachiopod, bryozoan, anthozoan, cephalopod, gastropod, fish, and coral remains.

== See also ==
- List of fossiliferous stratigraphic units in New Mexico
- Paleontology in New Mexico
