= Maxigoniatitidae =

Scientific classification
- Kingdom: Animalia
- Phylum: Mollusca
- Class: Cephalopoda
- Subclass: †Ammonoidea
- Order: †Goniatitida
- Superfamily: †Pericycloidea
- Family: †Maxigoniatitidae; Kusina, 1971

Genera
- Beyrichoceras; Bollandites; Bollandoceras; Dzhaprakoceras; Maxigoniatites; Ouaoufilalites

Extinct family of molluscs

Maxigoniatitidae is one of nine families of the Pericycloidea superfamily. They are an extinct group of ammonoid, which are shelled cephalopods related to squids, belemnites, octopuses, and cuttlefish, and more distantly to the nautiloids.
