= Anthracoceras =

Anthracoceras Temporal range: Serpukhovian-Moscovian

Scientific classification
- Kingdom: Animalia
- Phylum: Mollusca
- Class: Cephalopoda
- Subclass: †Ammonoidea
- Order: †Goniatitida
- Family: †Anthracoceratidae
- Genus: †Anthracoceras; Frech, 1899

Genus of molluscs (fossil)

Anthracoceras is the type genus of the goniatitid ammonoid family Anthracoceratidae whose species are found Mississippian-aged limestones in Eurasia, North America and Africa.
