= George Charles Crick =

George Charles Crick FGS FRGS FZS
- Born: 9 October 1856; Ampthill, Bedfordshire, England
- Died: 18 October 1917 (aged 61); Wimbledon, London, England
- Education: Bedford Modern School; Royal School of Mines

George Charles Crick FGS FRGS FZS (9 October 1856 – 18 October 1917) was a British geologist, one of the original members of the Malacological Society of London on its foundation in 1893, an authority on the fossil Cephalopoda compiling an early catalogue on it for the Natural History Museum and an author of numerous papers in the Proceedings of the Malacological Society of London and the Quarterly Journal of the Geological Society of London.

== Biography ==
Crick was born in Ampthill, Bedfordshire, on 9 October 1856. He was the son of Dr. Francis William Crick and educated at Bedford Modern School and the Royal School of Mines. Between January 1881 and 1886, Crick was employed as Assistant Secretary to Sir Warington Smyth, Chairman of "H.M. Commission to enquire into Accidents in Mines, etc.". In the same year and in a voluntary capacity, Crick joined the Geological Department of the Natural History Museum, London.

At the Natural History Museum Crick was commissioned to catalogue the fossil Cephalopoda (Belemnites and the Ammonites) and ‘throwing his whole heart into the work left it one of the best arranged and indexed collections’ at the Museum. He was appointed a First Assistant of the Museum in 1904.

In the course of his career Crick wrote sixty-seven papers that were published in various scientific journals including seven written in association with Arthur Humphreys Foord and one with Richard Bullen Newton who was also a first assistant at the Natural History Museum. His work included the description of seventy-four new species and the description of three new genera: Amphoreopsis, Styracoteuthis, and Belemnocamax.

Crick was elected a Fellow of the Geological Society of London in 1881, a Fellow of the Zoological Society of London in 1896 and a Fellow of the Royal Geographical Society in 1916.

Crick died in Wimbledon on 18 October 1917 and was survived by his wife, Emily Harriett Crick, who herself died on 29 January 1919.
