= Onate Formation =

Geologic formation in New Mexico, United States

- Stratigraphic range: Givetian; 387.7–382.7 Ma
- Type: Formation
- Underlies: Sly Gap Formation
- Overlies: Fusselman Formation, Montoya Group
- Thickness: 85–95 feet (26–29 m)

Lithology
- Primary: Siltstone
- Other: Shale, sandstone

Location
- Coordinates: 32.742°N 106.572°W
- Region: New Mexico
- Country: United States

Type section
- Named for: Onate Mountain
- Named by: F.V. Stevenson
- Year defined: 1945
- Onate Formation (the United States) Onate Formation (New Mexico)

The Onate Formation is a geologic formation that is exposed in most of the highlands of south-central New Mexico. It preserves fossils dating back to the middle Devonian period.

== Description ==
At the type section, the Onate Formation consists of about 85–95 feet (26–29 m) of orange yellow-weathering dolomitic siltstone with shales and sandstone. Elsewhere the thickness is more typically 15 to 32 ft (4.6 to 9.8 m). The base of the formation is a profound regional unconformity, so that the formation rest on either the Fusselman Formation or the Montoya Group. It is overlain by the Sly Gap Formation and thins to the north and south.

The formation is interpreted as having been deposited on a shallow shelf environment deepening to a euxenic basin to the south.

== Fossils ==
The formation contains the fossil brachiopod Spirifer acuminatu, as well as crinoids and bryozoans. The brachiopod assemblage includes 34 genera and 41 species. Conodonts are rare but a few tabulate corals, ichnofossils, and the receptaculid Sphaerospongia is present. The receptaculids provided a solid substrate for colonization by the rugose coral Tabulophyllum traversensis. The fossil assemblage gives an age of late Givetian. The formation is highly bioturbated.

== History of investigation ==
The beds assigned to the formation were previously correlated with the Canutillo Formation of west Texas. However, F.V. Stevenson questioned the correlation, and designated a new Onate Formation including the beds in 1945. In 1985, G.A. Cooper and J.T. Dutro, Jr., conducted the first thorough study of the fossil assemblage of the formation. The fossils were further characterized by James E. Souraf in 1987.

== See also ==
- List of fossiliferous stratigraphic units in New Mexico
- Paleontology in New Mexico
