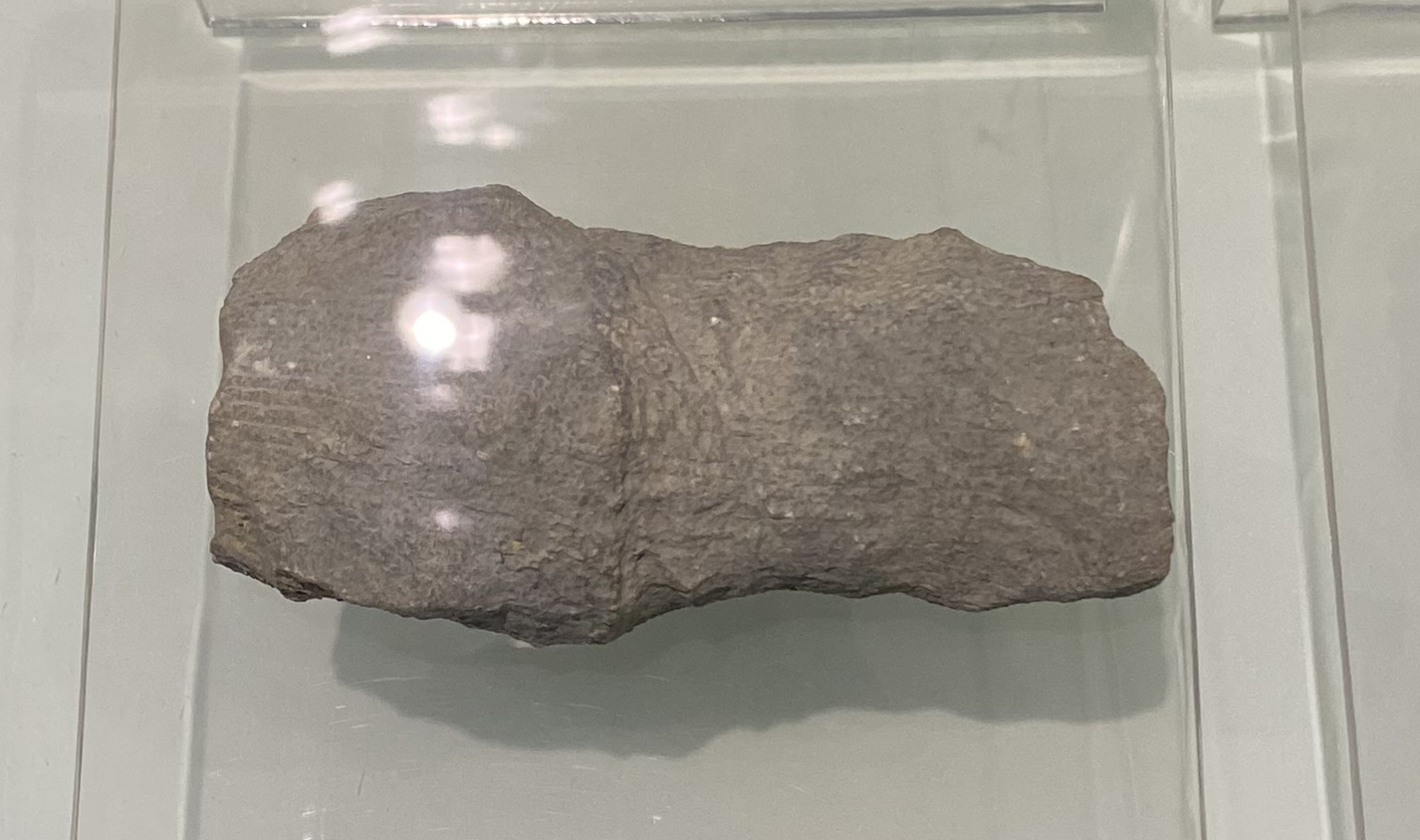
- Tabulophyllum fossil unearthed from Huaning County and collected in Yuxi Museum, Yunnan, China

Scientific classification
- Kingdom: Animalia
- Phylum: Cnidaria
- Subphylum: Anthozoa
- Class: †Rugosa
- Order: †Stauriida
- Family: †Kyphophyllidae
- Subfamily: †Kyphophyllinae
- Genus: †Tabulophyllum; Fenton and Fenton 1924

Species
- See text

= Tabulophyllum =

Tabulophyllum Temporal range: Devonian ~403–361 Ma

Extinct genus of coral

Tabulophyllum is an extinct genus of horn coral belonging to the order Stariidae and family Kyphophyllidae. Specimens have been found in Devonian beds in Australia North America, and most other major areas of Devonian outcrops. The genus was highly adaptable to a variety of substrates, including muddy, sandy, and firm substrates. The genus had a low-magnesium calcite skeleton and may have flourished in times of "calcite seas". There is evidence from fossil reefs in the Onate Formation of New Mexico, US that the genus favored the receptaculitid Sphaerospongia as a firm substrate for growth.

== Species ==
- T. buccinum Sorauf 1998
- T. carinatum Zhen 1995
- T. curtum Sorauf 1998
- T. levorsoni Sorauf 1998
- T. mutabile Sorauf 1998
- T. traversensis Winchell 1866
