= Fusselman Formation =

- Stratigraphic range: early Silurian
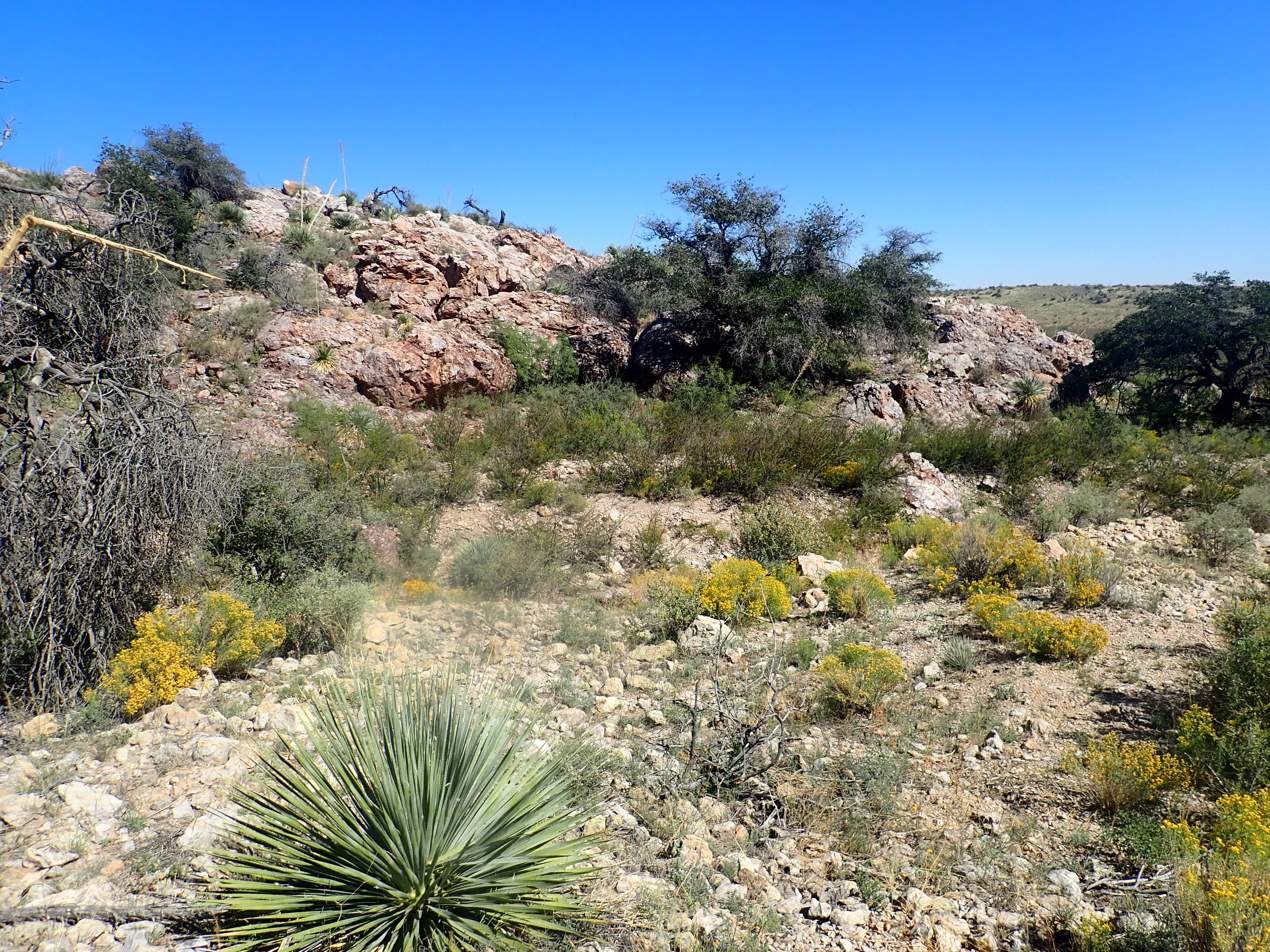
- Fusselman Formation at Quartzite Ridge, Lake Valley, New Mexico, USA
- Type: Formation
- Sub-units: Chamberino Member, Flag Hill Member, Crazycat Member
- Underlies: Percha Formation
- Overlies: Montoya Group
- Thickness: 1,400 meters (4,600 ft)

Lithology
- Primary: Dolomite

Location
- Coordinates: 31.8873°N 106.4779°W
- Region: Texas
- Country: United States

Type section
- Named by: G.B. Richardson
- Year defined: 1908
- Fusselman Formation (the United States) Fusselman Formation (Texas)

The Fusselman Formation is a geologic formation in westernmost Texas and southern New Mexico. It preserves fossils dating back to the early Silurian period.

== Description ==
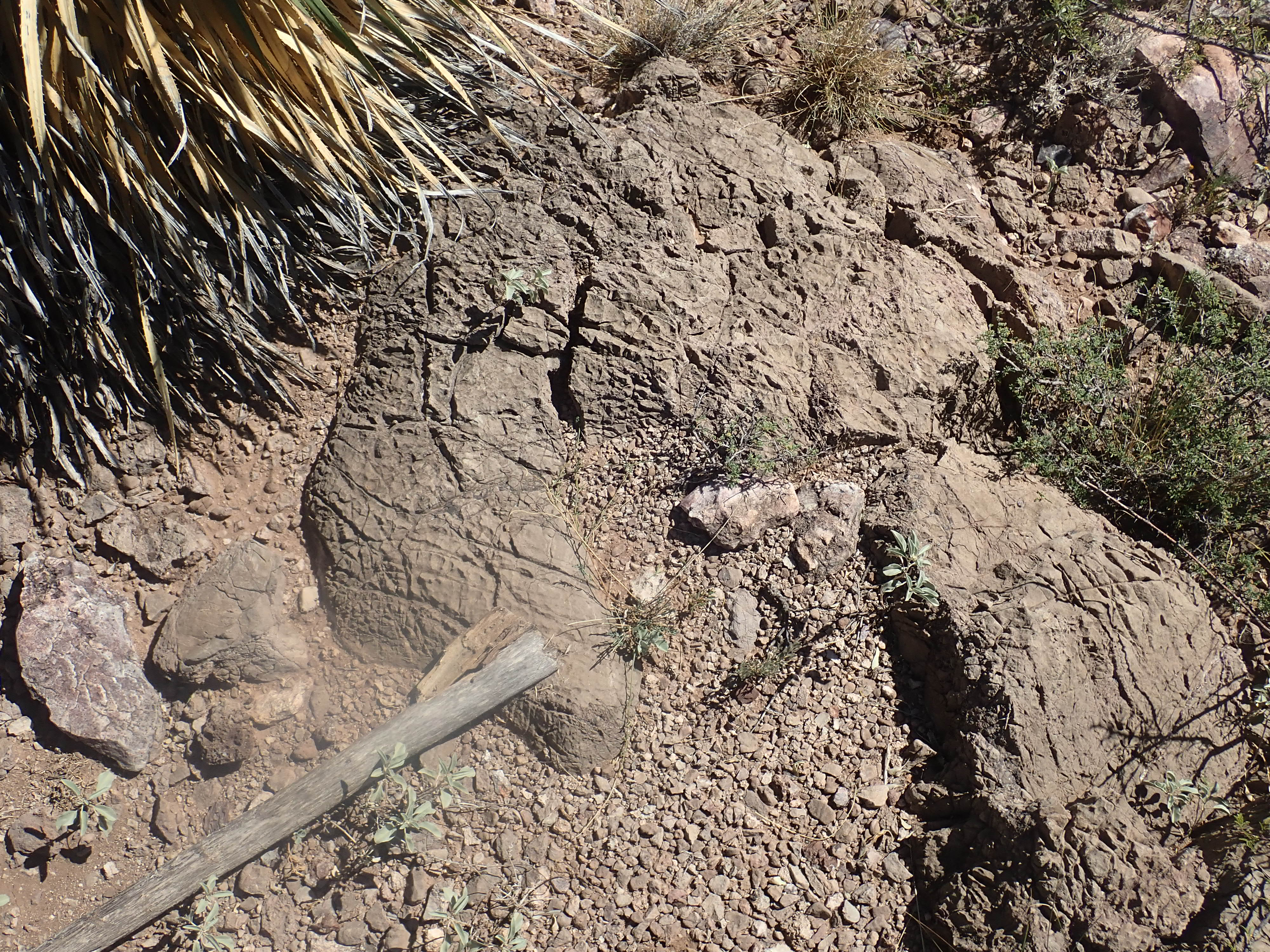
Karst surface in Fusselman Formation, Quartzite Ridge, Lake Valley, New Mexico, USA

The formation consists mostly of medium to dark gray massive dolomite. It has a light and dark banded appearance due to alternating beds of light gray peritidal laminated carbonate mudstone and dark gray cherty wackestone or packstone containing abundant corals. The total thickness is over 1,400 meters (4,600 ft) in the Florida Mountains but the formation varies greatly in thickness. The formations unconformably overlies the Montoya Group and is overlain by the Onate Formation. The upper contact shows that the area was tilted and eroded prior to the Devonian.

The formation is divided into the Chamberino, Flag Hill, and Crazycat members in the Sacramento Mountains.

Extensive dolomitization of the formation has obscured its primary depositional fabric and made interpretation of its depositional environment difficult.

== Fossils ==
The formation is relatively poor in fossils compared with the underlying El Paso Formation. However, it contains fossils of pentamerid brachiopods, corals, and stromatoporoids. These include the corals Cyanthophyllum, Favosites, Halysites, and Heliolites and the gastropod Hormatoma.

== Economic geology ==
The uppermost part of the formation shows significant barite-fluorite and base metal mineralization, where migrating fluids are trapped by the overlying impermeable shale formations.

== History of investigation ==
The name was first used by G.B. Richardson in 1908 for outcrops in Fusselman Canyon in the Franklin Mountains. It was divided into members in the Florida Mountains by Kottlowski and Pray in 1967.

== See also ==
- List of fossiliferous stratigraphic units in Texas
- Paleontology in Texas
