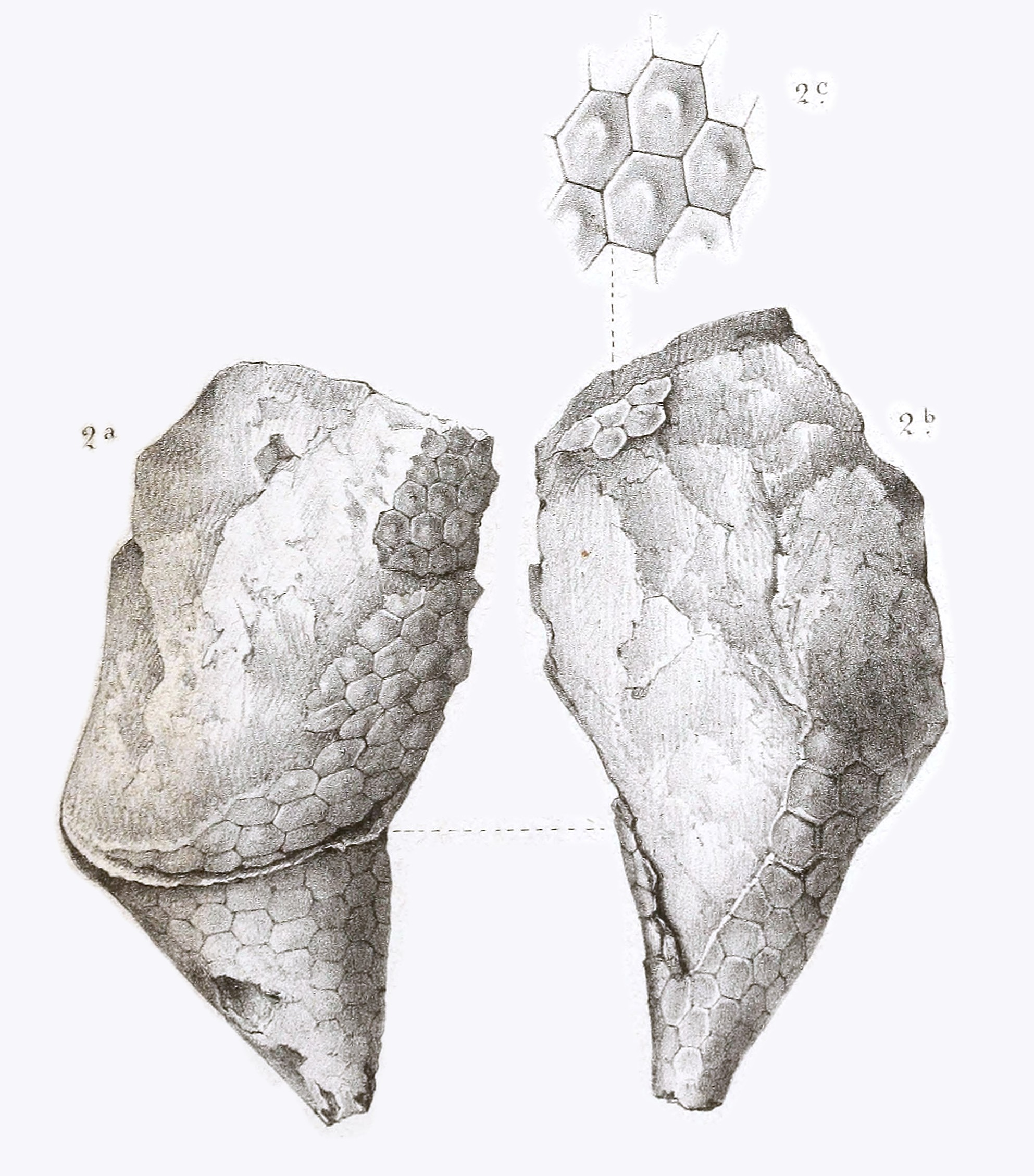
- Sphaerospongia tessellata

Scientific classification
- Clade: Viridiplantae
- Division: Chlorophyta
- Class: Ulvophyceae
- Order: Dasycladales (?)
- Family: †Receptaculitaceae
- Genus: †Sphaerospongia; Pengelly, 1861

Synonyms
- Sphaeronites Phillips, 1841

= Sphaerospongia =

Extinct genus of organism of

Sphaerospongia is an extinct genus of organism found in marine beds of Devonian age. Its classification is enigmatic, but it is typically placed among the sponges or the receptaculites. The organism has a surface covered with hexagonal plates, and some early taxonomists placed it among the echinoderms. It is found in close association with the horn coral Tabulophyllum traversensis in the Onate Formation of New Mexico, US, where it provides a substrate for the coral.
