= Aquilonites =

Aquilonites Temporal range: L Carboniferous (Tour)

Scientific classification
- Domain: Eukaryota
- Kingdom: Animalia
- Phylum: Mollusca
- Class: Cephalopoda
- Subclass: †Ammonoidea
- Order: †Goniatitida
- Family: †Intoceratidae
- Genus: †Aquilonites; Kusina, 1971

Genus of molluscs (fossil)

Aquilonites is a pericyclacean goniatitid belonging to the family Intoceratidae, suborder Goniatitina, that lived during the very early Carboniferous of what is now Russia. [1]

Aquilonites has a subdiscoidal, involute shell with a small to very narrow umbilicus, covered by biconvex growth lines and sometimes weak lirae. The ventral lobe of the suture is very narrow, with straight, almost parallel or slightly sigmoidal sides. The first outer saddle is rounded and somewhat wider than ventral lobe, the lateral lobe short and bowl shaped.[2]

Aquilonites is found in the Tournaisian age Kugutyk Formation in Orenburg, Russian Federation [3], in what can be called the Dombarovskii ammonites, associated with species of Gattendoria, Goniocyclus, Muensteroceras, and Eocantites.
