= Montoya Group =

- Stratigraphic range: late Ordovician
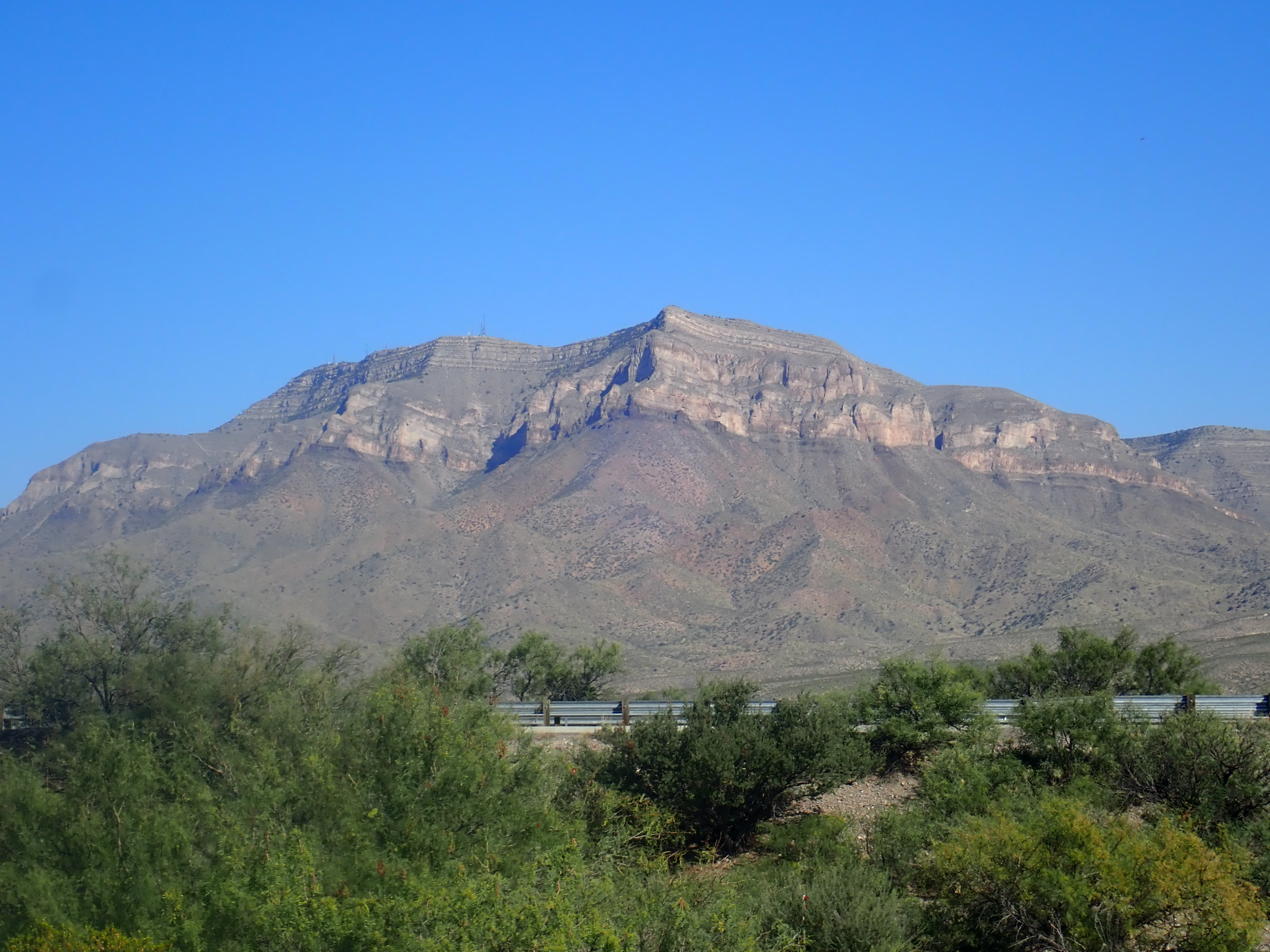
- Montoya Group beds form the shelf immediately below the peak of Timber Mountain, New Mexico, USA
- Type: Group
- Sub-units: Cable Canyon Sandstone, Upham Dolomite, Aleman Formation, Cutter Formation
- Underlies: Fusselman Formation, Percha Formation
- Overlies: El Paso Formation
- Thickness: 180 meters (590 ft)

Lithology
- Primary: Dolomite
- Other: Limestone, sandstone

Location
- Coordinates: 32.8519°N 105.8652°W
- Region: Texas
- Country: United States

Type section
- Named by: G.B. Richardson
- Year defined: 1908
- Montoya Group (the United States) Montoya Group (New Mexico)

The Montoya Group is a group of geologic formations in westernmost Texas and southern New Mexico. It preserves fossils dating back to the late Ordovician period.

== Description ==
The group consists mostly of dolomite but with some limestone and a basal sandstone. The total thickness is about 180 meters (590 ft). The group overlies the El Paso Formation and is overlain by the Fusselman Formation or Percha Formation, with both contacts difficult to define in some exposure areas. Biostratigraphy of the group is consistent with deposition in the Cincinnatian.

The group is divided into the Cable Canyon Sandstone, Upham Dolomite, Aleman Formation, and Cutter Formation These are treated as members in most of southern New Mexico, where the Montoya is relatively thin and remains at formation rank.

The Cable Canyon Sandstone is present in the northern exposures of the group and lies unconformably on the El Paso Formation. In the southern exposures, the Cable Canyon Sandstone is not present and the Upham Dolomite has a thin basal quartz sandstone.

The bulk of the Upham Dolomite is skeletal packstone and grainstone arising from dolomitization of a crinoidal calcarenite. Hardgrounds are found throughout the unit.

The Aleman Formation has up to 70% chert, in the form of thin continuous beds of sponge spicules within calcisiltite beds or of diagenetic lenses of chert nodules within skeletal wackestone or packstone. The continuous chert beds appear to have been laid down in cool water, while the packstone was deposited in warmer water.

The Cutter Formation is mostly bioturbated tidal flat carbonate mudstone or dolomite.

The contact with the underlying El Paso Formation is an unconformity corresponding to a hiatus of about 30 million years. In the Franklin Mountains, the upper El Paso Formation shows pronounced karst weathering. In other locations, the contact is sharp.

The group is interpreted as having been deposited within 30 degrees of the equator on the subtidal zone of a passive continental margin during the transition to late Ordovician glaciation. The presence of abundant chert and phosphate minerals in the group is attributed to upwelling along the continental margin, possibly triggered by glaciation.

== Fossils ==
The Cable Canyon Sandstone contains trace fossils (Skolithos). The Upham Formation is rich in fossils, including brachiopods, bryozoans, corals, crinoids, gastropods, nautiloids, and receptaculids. The gastropod Maclurites is particularly prominent. The Aleman Formation is dominated by brachiopods, with some gastropods and tentaculites but few crinoids or bryozoans. The Cutter Formation contains abundant thin packstone beds with numerous brachiopods, bryozoans, and crinoids.

== Economic geology ==
The formation has the potential to be an important natural gas reservoir in southern New Mexico, using horizontal drilling with hydrofacturing, with successful drilling reported by 2004.

== History of investigation ==
The name was first used by G.B. Richardson in 2008, who did not explain the origin of the name or designate a type section. The formation was promoted to group rank by Kelley and Silver in 1952, who divided the group into the Cable Canyon sandstone, Upham dolomite, Aleman formation, and Cutter formation in the Franklin Mountains, but the Montoya remains a formation in southern New Mexico, where its subunits are too thin to be mappable at the usual 1:24,000 scale.

== See also ==
- List of fossiliferous stratigraphic units in Texas
- Paleontology in Texas
