= Kozhimitidae =

Kozhimitidae Temporal range: Tournaisian–Visean

Scientific classification
- Kingdom: Animalia
- Phylum: Mollusca
- Class: Cephalopoda
- Subclass: †Ammonoidea
- Order: †Goniatitida
- Superfamily: †Pericycloidea
- Family: †Kozhimitidae; Kusina, 1971

Genera
- Kozhimites

Extinct family of molluscs

Kozhimitidae is a family of ammonites in the superfamily Pericycloidea.
