= Anthracoceratoides =

Scientific classification
- Kingdom: Animalia
- Phylum: Mollusca
- Class: Cephalopoda
- Subclass: †Ammonoidea
- Order: †Goniatitida
- Family: †Anthracoceratidae
- Genus: †Anthracoceratoides; Ramsbottom, 1970

Genus of molluscs (fossil)

Anthracoceratoides is a genus belonging to the Anthracoceratidae family. They are an extinct group of ammonoid, which are shelled cephalopods related to squids, belemnites, octopuses, and cuttlefish, and more distantly to the nautiloids.
