= Leiorhynchus =

Leiorhynchus Temporal range: Devonian-Mississippian ~387–325 Ma

Scientific classification
- Domain: Eukaryota
- Kingdom: Animalia
- Phylum: Brachiopoda
- Class: Rhynchonellata
- Order: Rhynchonellida
- Family: †Leiorhynchidae
- Subfamily: †Leiorhynchinae
- Genus: †Leiorhynchus; Hall 1860

Species
- See text

Extinct genus of brachiopod

Leiorhynchus is an extinct genus of brachiopod belonging to the order Rhynchonellida and family Leiorhynchidae. Specimens have been found in South America, North America, and Russia in beds of middle Devonian to Mississippian age (372 to 325 million years old). The genus may have been adapted to dysaerobic environments, colonizing areas of reduced oxygen concentrations rich in organic matter. The genus has been used as an index fossil in North America.

== Species ==
- L. carboniferum
- L. castanea Meek 1868
- L. hippocastanea Crickmay 1960
- L. kelloggi Hall 1867
- L. mesacostale Hall 1843
- L. miriam Johnson 1971
- L. quadracostatus Vanuxem 1842
- L. ripheicus Stepanov 1948
- L. rockymontanum Marcou 1858
