= Bliss Formation =

Geologic formation in New Mexico, Texas, and Arizona, US

- Stratigraphic range: late Cambrian–early Ordovician
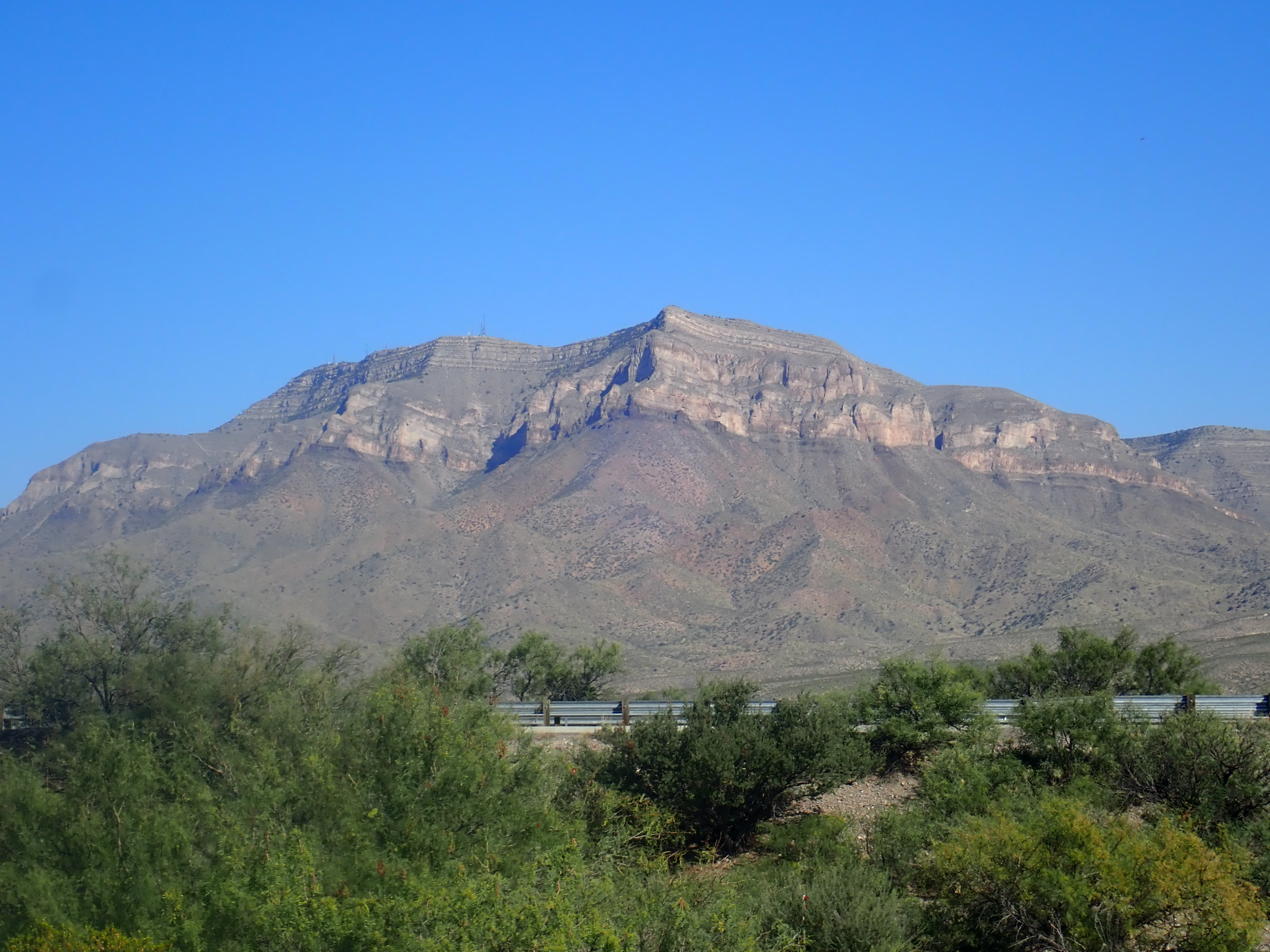
- Bliss Formation forms the dark band at the very base of the massive cliffs of Timber Mountain, New Mexico, USA.
- Type: Formation
- Underlies: El Paso Formation
- Overlies: Precambrian basement
- Thickness: 100 meters (330 ft)

Lithology
- Primary: Sandstone
- Other: Conglomerate, limestone, dolomite

Location
- Coordinates: 31.835°N 106.485°W
- Region: Texas, New Mexico, Arizona
- Country: United States

Type section
- Named for: Fort Bliss
- Named by: G.B. Richardson
- Year defined: 1904
- Bliss Formation (the United States) Bliss Formation (New Mexico)

The Bliss Formation is a geologic formation that is exposed in southern New Mexico, west Texas, and southeastern Arizona. It preserves fossils dating back to the late Cambrian to early Ordovician periods.

== Description ==
The formation consists of ledge-forming brown to maroon medium- to coarse-grained sandstone; thinner beds of very fine-grained glauconitic sandstone; and fine-grained sandstone interbedded with limestone or dolomite. A conglomerate bed is often present at the base and there are rare beds of oolitic ironstone. The formation lies unconformably on Precambrian basement rock except in the Florida Mountains, where it overlies Cambrian syenite and granite. The formation fills paleovalleys in the basement rock, and in some locations (such as the central Franklin Mountains and the west-central Florida Mountains) it is absent. It grades into the overlying El Paso Formation, with the contact placed either at the top of uppermost red or brown sandstone bed of the Bliss Formation or the base of the carbonate cliff characteristic of the El Paso Formation.

The formation straddles the Cambrian-Ordovician boundary, with the lower beds containing fossils of Trempealeauan age and the upper beds containing fossils of Skullrockian age.

The formation is interpreted as marine sediments deposited on a passive continental margin during a marine transgression advancing to the northeast.

== Fossils ==
The formation is locally bioturbated and contains fossils of the brachiopods Obolus, Lingulella, and Lingulepis acuminata. However, the formation has few macroscopic fossils useful for biostratigraphy. The best dated section is in the Flordillo Canyon in the central Caballo Mountains, which contains trilobite and conodont fossils that have helped determine its age. The lower beds are very scarce in fossils and difficult to date across the exposure area.

== History of investigation ==
The formation was first named by G.B. Richardson in 1904 for exposures in the Franklin Mountains.
