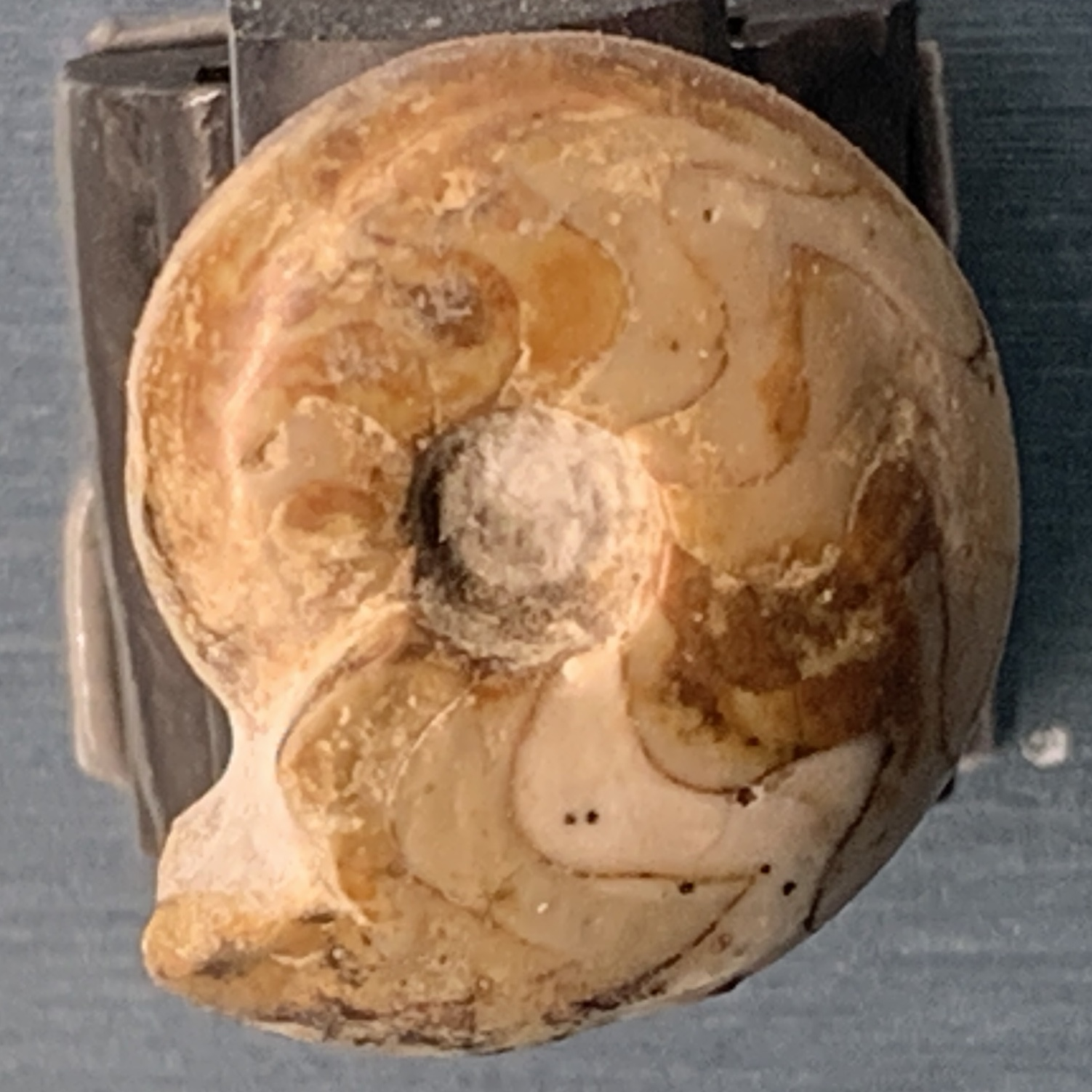
- Muensteroceras parallelum, Early Carboniferous, Illinois

Scientific classification
- Kingdom: Animalia
- Phylum: Mollusca
- Class: Cephalopoda
- Subclass: †Ammonoidea
- Order: †Goniatitida
- Superfamily: †Pericycloidea
- Family: †Muensteroceratidae; Librovitch, 1957

Genera
- Akeshakeceras; Beyrichoceratoides; Cluthoceras; Eoglyphioceras; Eurites; Itimaites; Muensteroceras; Terektytes

= Muensteroceratidae =

Extinct family of molluscs

Muensteroceratidae is one of nine families of the Pericycloidea superfamily. They are an extinct group of ammonoid, which are shelled cephalopods related to squids, belemnites, octopuses, and cuttlefish, and more distantly to the nautiloids.
