= Pericyclinae =

Scientific classification
- Kingdom: Animalia
- Phylum: Mollusca
- Class: Cephalopoda
- Subclass: †Ammonoidea
- Order: †Goniatitida
- Family: †Pericyclidae
- Subfamily: †Pericyclinae; Hyatt 1900

Genera
- Asiacyclus; Bouhamedites; Caenocyclus; Goniocycloides; Goniocyclus; Hammatocyclus; Neopericyclus; Orthocyclus; Parahammatocyclus; Pericyclus; Polaricyclus; Rhiphaeocyclus; Rotopericyclus

Extinct subfamily of molluscs

Pericyclinae is one of two subfamilies of the family Pericyclidae. They are an extinct group of ammonoid, which are shelled cephalopods related to squids, belemnites, octopuses, and cuttlefish, and more distantly to the nautiloids.
