= Lake Valley Limestone =

Geologic formation in New Mexico, US

- Stratigraphic range: Tournaisian–Visean
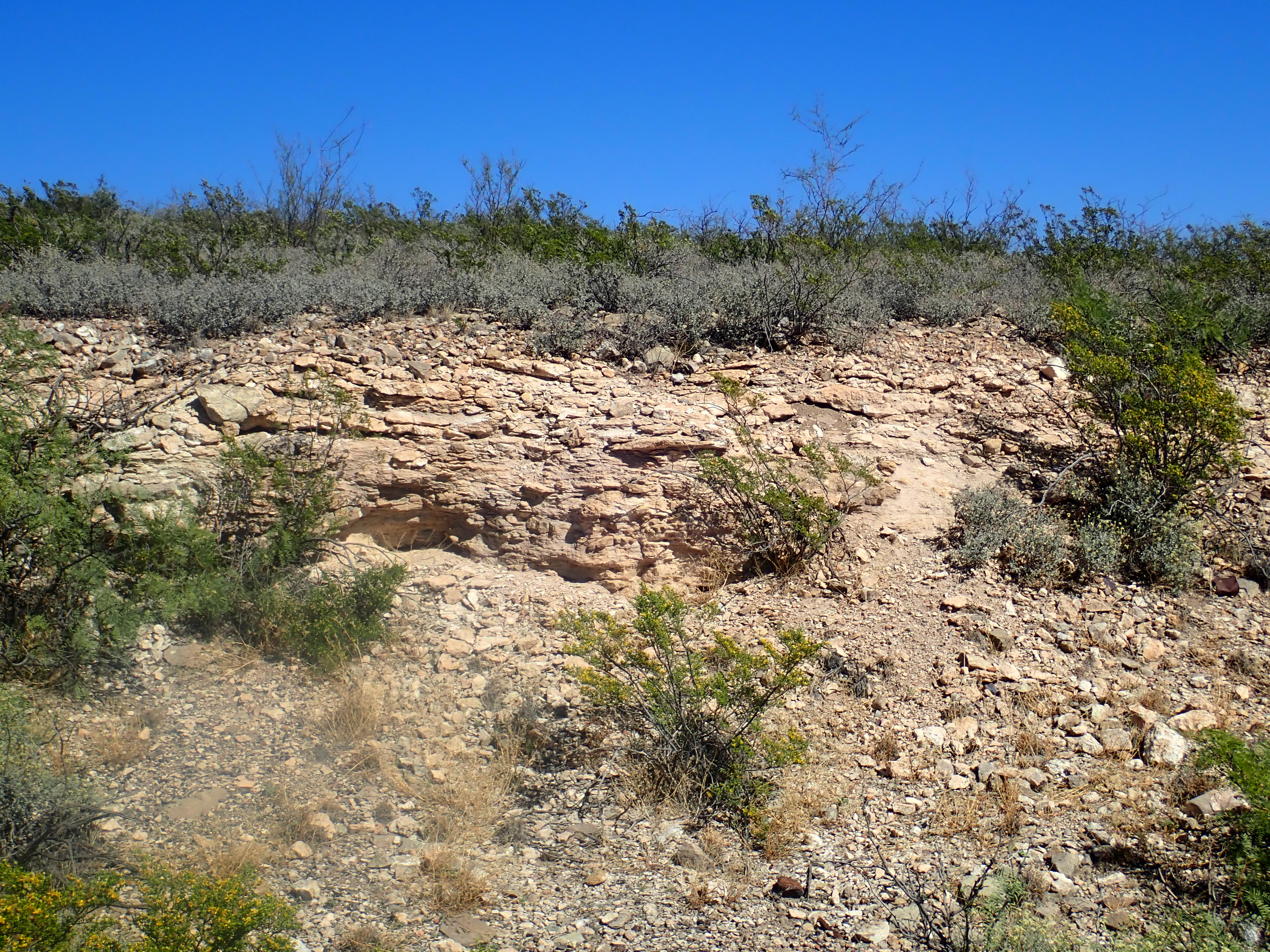
- Lake Valley Limestone at its type locality, north of Lake Valley, New Mexico, USA
- Type: Formation
- Sub-units: See text
- Overlies: Percha Shale, Caballero Formation
- Thickness: 420 ft (130 m)

Lithology
- Primary: Limestone

Location
- Coordinates: 32.723°N 107.570°W
- Region: New Mexico
- Country: United States

Type section
- Named for: Lake Valley
- Named by: E.D. Cope
- Year defined: 1882
- Lake Valley Limestone (the United States) Lake Valley Limestone (New Mexico)

The Lake Valley Limestone is a geologic formation widely exposed in southwestern New Mexico. It preserves fossils dating back to the lower to middle Mississippian.

== Description ==
The Lake Valley Limestone consists of gray cherty limestone with thin shale beds. It overlies the Caballero Formation and is overlain by Pennsylvanian beds. The total thickness is 420 ft (130 m).

Members of the formation, in ascending stratigraphic order, are the Andrecito, Alamogordo, Nunn, Tierra Blanca, Arcente, and Dona Ana Members.

== Fossils ==
The formation contains abundant crinoids as well as corals and brachiopods. The Andrecito and Alamogordo Members contain foraminifers characteristic of the Kinderhookian (lower Tournasian) while the foraminifers of the Tierra Blanca Member are Osagean (upper Tournasian to lower Visean). The formation is notable for the presence of well-developed bioherms.

== History of investigation ==
The formation was first named by E.D. Cope in 1882 for exposures at Lake Valley, Sierra County, New Mexico. In 1941, Laudon and Bowsher removed the lowermost beds into the Caballero Formation and divided the Lake Valley Limestone into the Alamgordo, Arcente, and Dona Ana Members. In 1949, they added the Andrecito, Nunn, and Tierra Blanca Members.

== Economic geology ==
The formation hosted the rich silver deposits at Lake Valley. These had produced some 5.8 million ounces (180 tonnes) of silver by 1931, but the richest lode was worked out by 1883, and by 1960 the mines had closed. The ore took the form of native silver, argentite, chlorargyrite, and bromargyrite, deposited in folds in impervious shale beds overlying intrusions of monzonite porphyry of the Mogollon-Datil volcanic field.

== See also ==
- List of fossiliferous stratigraphic units in New Mexico
- Paleontology in New Mexico
