= El Paso Formation =

Geologic formation in New Mexico, US

- Stratigraphic range: Early Ordovician
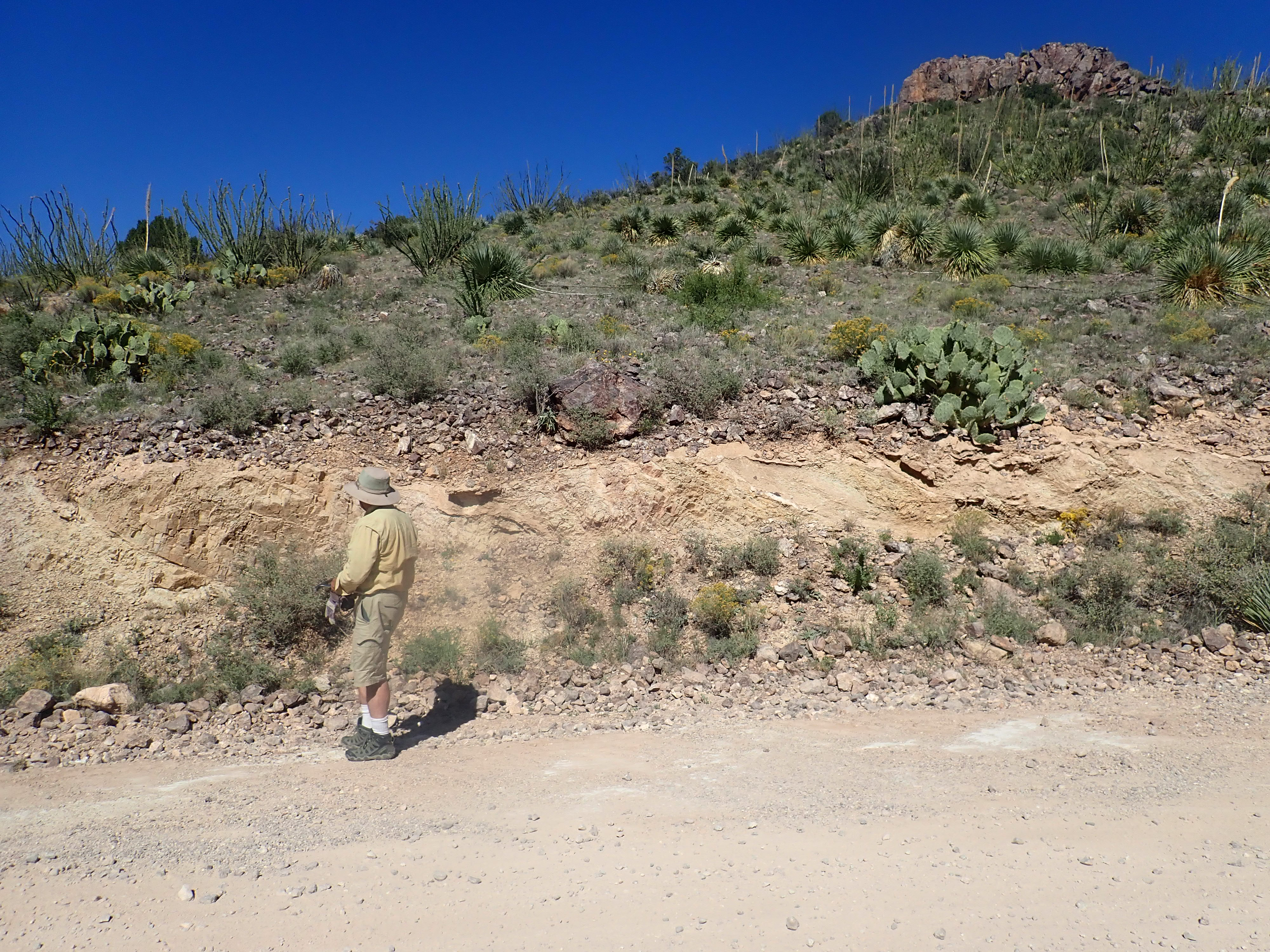
- El Paso Formation in road cut near Lake Valley, New Mexico, USA
- Type: Formation
- Sub-units: See text
- Underlies: Portal Formation, Montoya Group
- Overlies: Bliss Formation, Coronado Sandstone, Precambrian basement
- Thickness: 137–300 meters (449–984 ft)

Lithology
- Primary: Limestone, dolomite
- Other: Siltstone

Location
- Coordinates: 31.90°N 106.49°W
- Region: Texas, New Mexico, Arizona
- Country: United States

Type section
- Named for: El Paso, Texas
- Named by: G.B. Richardson
- Year defined: 1904
- El Paso Formation (the United States) El Paso Formation (New Mexico)

The El Paso Formation is a geologic formation that is exposed from the Permian Basin of New Mexico and Texas to southeastern Arizona. It preserves fossils dating back to the Ordovician period.

== Description ==
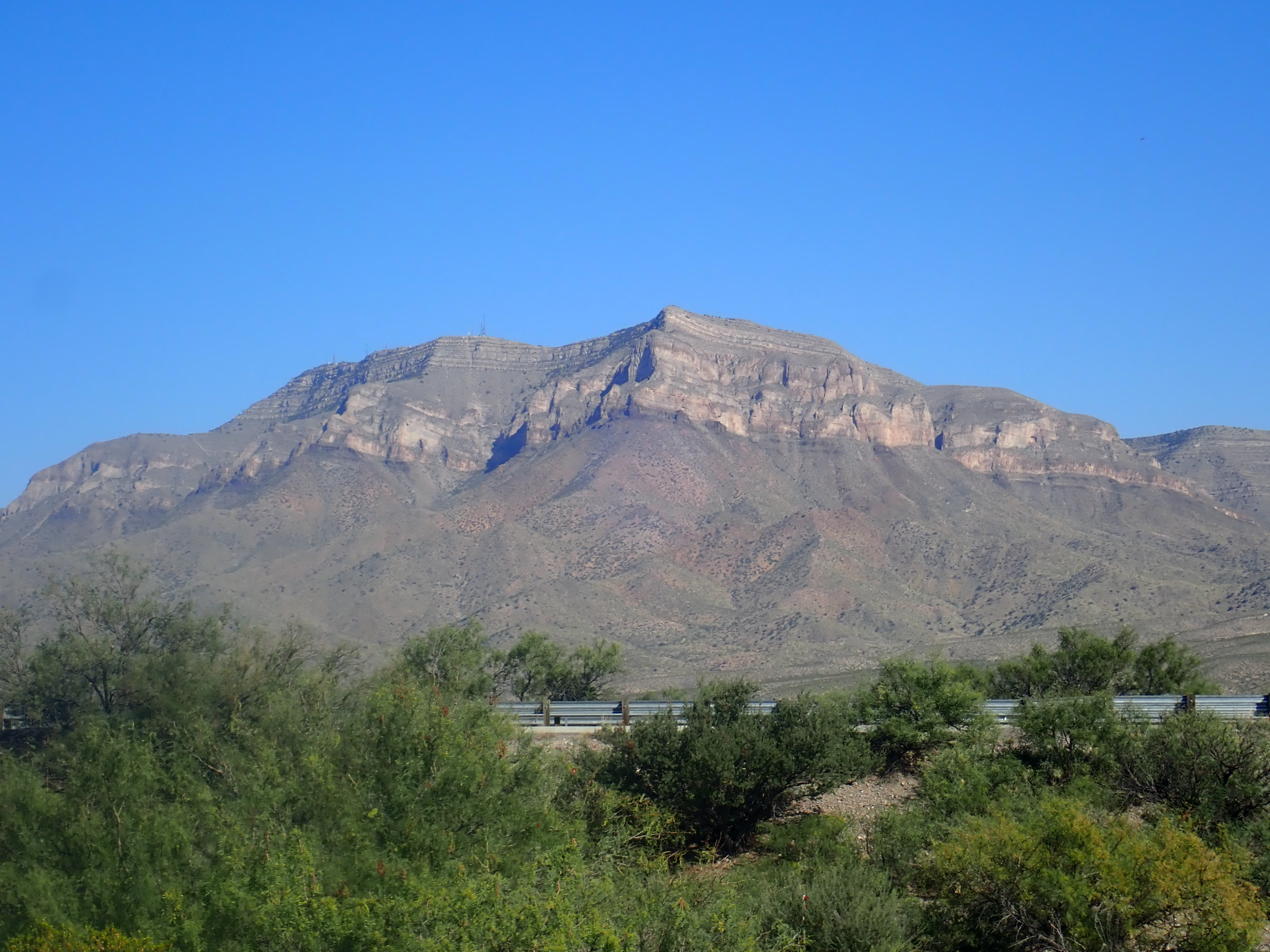
El Paso Formation forms the lowest part of the massive limestone beds atop Timber Mountain, New Mexico, USA.

The formation is composed of gray cherty dolomite, limestone, and smaller amounts of siltstone. The formation often has a mottled appearance. Total thickness is 137–300 meters (449–984 ft). It lies unconformably on the Bliss Formation, the Coronado Sandstone, or (in the Florida Mountains) Precambrian basement, and is overlain by the Montoya Group or Portal Formation.

== Fossils ==
The formation is only sparsely fossiliferous, but contains fossils of echinoderms, gastropods, trilobites, sponge spicules, and Nuia. Rare ostracods, cephalopods, and brachiopods are also found, as is the trace fossil Planolites. Bioherms up to 6 meters (20 ft) high are found in the McKelligon Member, built up of siliceous sponges and receptaculitid Calathium.

== History of investigation ==
The formation was first named by George Burr Richardson in 1904 for exposures in the Franklin and Hueco Mountains. All Ordovician beds of the Franklin Mountains were originally included in the formation. Richardson later (1908) mapped the formation into the Permian Basin and assigned the upper Ordovician beds to the Montoya Limestone. In 1965, Zeller divided the formation in southwestern New Mexico into the Sierrita and Bat Cave Members. Clemons (1991) divided the formation differently, into the Hitt Canyon, Jose, McKelligon, and Padre Members.

In 1964, R.H. Flower proposed promoting the El Paso Formation to group rank and recommended several divisions into formations, based largely on biostratigraphy, such as the Big Hatchet Formation, the Cooks Formation, the Florida Mountain Formation, the Scenic Drive Formation, or the Victorio Hills Formation. However, this has not been widely accepted, and Greg H. Mack rejected both the promotion of the El Paso Formation to group rank and the designation of biostratigraphic zones within the El Paso as formations.

== See also ==
- List of fossiliferous stratigraphic units in Texas
- Paleontology in Texas
