= Anthracoceratidae =

Scientific classification
- Kingdom: Animalia
- Phylum: Mollusca
- Class: Cephalopoda
- Subclass: †Ammonoidea
- Order: †Goniatitida
- Superfamily: †Pericycloidea
- Family: †Anthracoceratidae; Plummer & Scott 1957

Genera
- Anthracoceras; Anthracoceratoides; Cathranoceras; Zhifangoceras

Extinct family of molluscs

Anthracoceratidae is one of nine families of the Pericycloidea superfamily. They are an extinct group of ammonoid, which are shelled cephalopods related to squids, belemnites, octopuses, and cuttlefish, and more distantly to the nautiloids.
