= Arthur Humphreys Foord =

British palaeontologist and illustrator (1844–1933)

- Born: 14 September 1844; Brixton, Surrey, England
- Died: 12 August 1933 (aged 88); Hove, Sussex
- Scientific career
- Fields: Palaeontology
- Workplaces: Royal Dublin Society

Arthur Humphreys Foord (14 September 1844 – 12 August 1933) was a British palaeontologist and scientific illustrator.

== Life and family ==
Arthur Humphreys Foord was born, with his twin brother Alfred Stanley Foord, in Brixton, Surrey on 14 September 1844. His parents were Sarah Stanley Hooper and John Bromley Foord. He had three older brothers, including his twin. His father was secretary to the General Mining Association of Nova Scotia in London. He attended a preparatory school from 1853 to 1856, when he entered Chatham House School, Ramsgate, Kent in 1857.

Foord married Ida Franziska Adelheid Kuhlmeyer (1842–1916) on 2 April 1896 in Dublin. He moved back in England in 1930, settling in Red Cottage, Hove Street, Hove, Sussex. He died there on 12 August 1933.

== Career ==
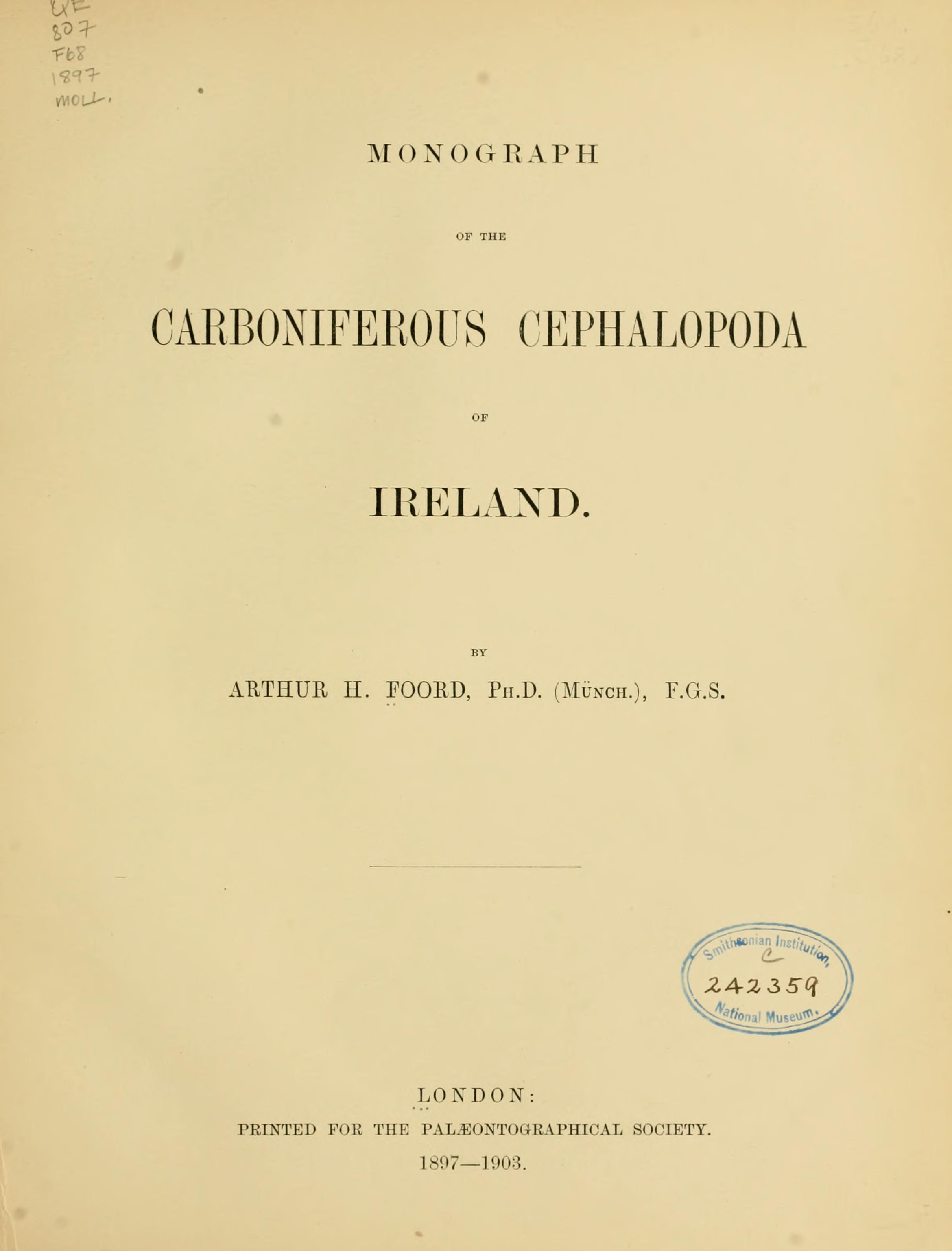
Monograph of the Carboniferous Cephalopoda of Ireland BHL11760942

Foord worked in a commercial business from 1861 to 1871, during which time he built a reputation for his natural history illustrations. He travelled to Montreal in late 1871, with letters of introduction to the first director of the Geological Survey of Canada, Sir William Edmond Logan, Alfred Richard Cecil Selwyn, and to John William Dawson. In early 1872, the Geological Survey of Canada appointed Foord as a natural history artist, a position he held until 1883. During this time he was heavily influenced by Elkanah Billings, Joseph Frederick Whiteaves, and Henry Alleyne Nicholson. Though he worked primarily as an artist, he also gained experience of field collecting and of museum curation. From 1875 to 1876 he took courses in zoology and paleontology at McGill University under Dawson.

In 1883, he was appointed assistant paleontologist when the survey moved to Ottawa. He resigned this post in the summer of 1883, and returned to London. He worked as a volunteer at the British Museum (Natural History) and took up private study of geology with Thomas Rupert Jones and practical zoology and comparative anatomy with George Bond Howes and T. Johnson. His first publication was "Contribution to the micro-paleontology of the Cambro-Silurian rocks of Canada" in 1883, which was followed by 5 papers on fossil corals in the Annals and Magazine of Natural History between 1884 and 1886, while in collaboration with Robert Etheridge junior and Henry A. Nicholson.

Foord was given the responsibility of preparing the Catalogue of the Fossil Cephalopoda in the British Museum (Natural History) in 1886, seeing the first two volumes published in 1888 and 1891, and a third with George Charles Crick published in 1897. As part of this work, he studied type material in Munich and Brussels. He also published a number of papers and reviews on nautiloids in the Geological Magazine at this time. He was made a fellow of the Geological Society of London, and was awarded half of the Lyell geological fund in 1888 for his work.

He moved to Dublin in 1891 when he was appointed librarian and editor of scientific publications of the Royal Dublin Society, a position he held until his retirement in 1920. He worked on the cephalopod material in the Geological Survey of Ireland collections and the National Museum of Ireland, and gathered a large personal collection. In 1896, he was awarded a doctorate from the Ludwig-Maximilians-Universität München having submitted a thesis to Karl Alfred von Zittel. He later published the thesis as a 5 volume monograph with the Palaeontographical Society, Carboniferous Cephalopoda of Ireland (1897–1903). With his wife he translated work from by Edmund von Mojsisovics on Himalayan fossils from German.
