= Percha Formation =

Geologic formation in New Mexico, US

- Stratigraphic range: Famennian
- Type: Formation
- Sub-units: Ready Pay Member, Box Member
- Underlies: Lake Valley Limestone, Caballero Formation, Escabrosa Limestone
- Overlies: Fusselman Formation, Sly Gap Formation, Onate Formation
- Thickness: 132 feet (40 m)

Lithology
- Primary: Shale
- Other: Limestone

Location
- Coordinates: 32.9159°N 107.5267°W
- Region: New Mexico
- Country: United States

Type section
- Named for: Percha Creek
- Named by: G.H. Gordon
- Year defined: 1907
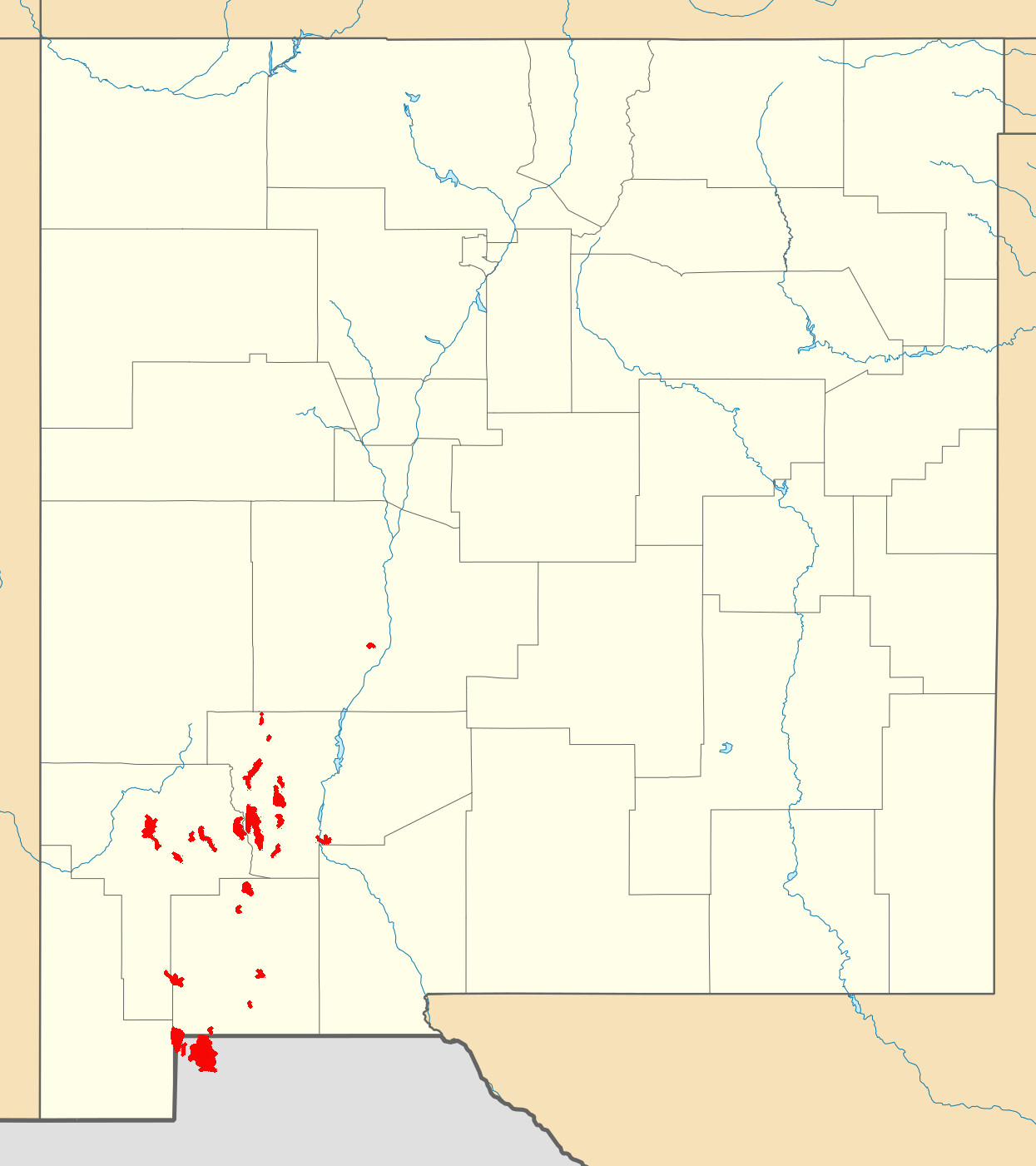
- Percha Formation (New Mexico)

The Percha Formation is a geologic formation in southern New Mexico. It preserves fossils dating back to the Famennian Age of the late Devonian period.

== Description ==
The formation consists mostly of black to gray shale and minor limestone. It rests on a regional unconformity, so that the underlying formation may be the Fusselman Formation, the Sly Gap Formation, or the Onate Formation. It underlies the Lake Valley Limestone, Caballero Formation, Escabrosa Limestone, or other Mississippian formations. Total thickness is about 132 feet (40 m).

The formation is divided into two members. The Ready Pay Member (formerly lower Percha) is mostly black fissile shale nearly devoid of fossils and with a total thickness of about 132 feet (40 m). The Box Member (formerly upper Percha), which is much less limited in areal extent, is about 47 feet (14 m) of gray to green calcareous shale with limestone nodules and beds. It is highly fossiliferous.

== Fossils ==
The base of the formation contains fossils of arthrodiran fish, shark teeth, late Fammenian conodonts, brachiopods, and corals. The Box Member contains fossils of brachiopods, crinoids, bryozoans, sponges, corals, and late Fammenian conodonts.

== History of investigation ==
The formation was first named as the Percha Shale by C.H. Gordon in 1907 for exposures at Percha Creek. However, a type section was not designated until 1945, by F.V. Stevenson. Stevenson also divided the formation into the lower Ready Pay Member and the upper Box Member. D. Schumacher and coinvestigators mapped the formation into southeastern Arizona and renamed it the Percha Formation in 1976.

== See also ==
- List of fossiliferous stratigraphic units in New Mexico
- Paleontology in New Mexico
