= Pericycloidea =

Scientific classification
- Kingdom: Animalia
- Phylum: Mollusca
- Class: Cephalopoda
- Subclass: †Ammonoidea
- Order: †Goniatitida
- Suborder: †Goniatitina
- Superfamily: †Pericycloidea; Librovitch 1957

Families
- Anthracoceratidae; Eogonioloboceratidae; Furnishoceratidae; Intoceratidae; Kozhimitidae; Maxigoniatitidae; Muensteroceratidae; Pericyclidae; Sudeticeratidae

Synonyms
- Pericyclaceae

Extinct superfamily of molluscs

Pericycloidea is one of seventeen superfamilies of the Goniatitina suborder. They are an extinct group of ammonoid, which are shelled cephalopods related to squids, belemnites, octopodes, and cuttlefish, and more distantly to the nautiloids.
